= Vas County 3rd constituency =

Parliamentary constituency in Hungary

- Constituency for the National Assembly
- Location of Vas county 03 within Vas county

- Location of Vas county within Hungary
- County: Vas County
- Population: 79,520 (2022)
- Major settlements: Körmend

Current constituency
- Created: 2011
- Party: Fidesz–KDNP
- Member: Zsolt V. Németh
- Elected: 2014, 2018, 2022, 2026

The Vas County 3rd parliamentary constituency is one of the 106 constituencies into which the territory of Hungary is divided by Act CCIII of 2011, and in which voters can elect one member of parliament. The standard abbreviation of the name of the constituency is: Vas 03. OEVK. Seat: Körmend.

== Area ==
The constituency includes the following settlements:

1. Alsószölnök
2. Alsóújlak
3. Andrásfa
4. Apátistvánfalva
5. Bajánsenye
6. Bejcgyertyános
7. Bérbaltavár
8. Boba
9. Borgáta
10. Bögöte
11. Csákánydoroszló
12. Csehi
13. Csehimindszent
14. Csempeszkopács
15. Csipkerek
16. Csörötnek
17. Daraboshegy
18. Döbörhegy
19. Döröske
20. Duka
21. Egervölgy
22. Egyházashetye
23. Egyházashollós
24. Egyházasrádóc
25. Felsőjánosfa
26. Felsőmarác
27. Felsőszölnök
28. Gasztony
29. Gérce
30. Gersekarát
31. Gyanógeregye
32. Győrvár
33. Halastó
34. Halogy
35. Harasztifalu
36. Hegyháthodász
37. Hegyhátsál
38. Hegyhátszentjakab
39. Hegyhátszentmárton
40. Hegyhátszentpéter
41. Hosszúpereszteg
42. Ikervár
43. Ispánk
44. Ivánc
45. Ják
46. Jánosháza
47. Káld
48. Kám
49. Karakó
50. Katafa
51. Keléd
52. Kemeneskápolna
53. Kemenespálfa
54. Kemestaródfa
55. Kenéz
56. Kercaszomor
57. Kerkáskápolna
58. Kétvölgy
59. Kisrákos
60. Kissomlyó
61. Kisunyom
62. Kondorfa
63. Köcsk
64. Körmend
65. Magyarlak
66. Magyarnádalja
67. Magyarszecsőd
68. Magyarszombatfa
69. Megyehíd
70. Meggyeskovácsi
71. Mikosszéplak
72. Molnaszecsőd
73. Nádasd
74. Nagykölked
75. Nagymizdó
76. Nagyrákos
77. Nagytilaj
78. Nemeskeresztúr
79. Nemeskocs
80. Nemeskolta
81. Nemesmedves
82. Nemesrempehollós
83. Nyőgér
84. Olaszfa
85. Orfalu
86. Oszkó
87. Őrimagyarósd
88. Őriszentpéter
89. Pácsony
90. Pankasz
91. Pecöl
92. Petőmihályfa
93. Pinkamindszent
94. Püspökmolnári
95. Rábagyarmat
96. Rábahídvég
97. Rábatöttös
98. Rádóckölked
99. Rátót
100. Rönök
101. Rum
102. Sárfimizdó
103. Sorkifalud
104. Sorkikápolna
105. Sorokpolány
106. Sótony
107. Szaknyér
108. Szakonyfalu
109. Szalafő
110. Szarvaskend
111. Szatta
112. Szemenye
113. Szentgotthárd
114. Szentpéterfa
115. Szőce
116. Tanakajd
117. Táplánszentkereszt
118. Telekes
119. Vasalja
120. Vásárosmiske
121. Vashosszúfalu
122. Vasvár
123. Vasszécseny
124. Vasszentmihály
125. Velemér
126. Viszák
127. Zsennye

== Members of parliament ==
Name	Party	Term	Election
Zsolt V. Németh	Fidesz-KDNP	2014 –	Results of the 2014 parliamentary election:
Zsolt V. Németh	Fidesz-KDNP	2014 –	Results of the 2018 parliamentary election:
Zsolt V. Németh	Fidesz-KDNP	2014 –	Results of the 2022 parliamentary election:
Zsolt V. Németh	Fidesz-KDNP	2014 –	Results of the 2026 parliamentary election:

== Demographics ==
Historical population
Year	Pop.	±%
2011	83,510	—
2022	79,520	−4.8%

The demographics of the constituency are as follows. The population of the constituency No. 3 of Vas County was 79,520 on October 1, 2022. The population of the constituency decreased by 3,990 between the 2011 and 2022 censuses. Based on the age composition, the majority of the population in the constituency is middle-aged with 30,036 people, while the least is children with 12,836 people. 79.8% of the population of the constituency has internet access.

According to the highest level of completed education, those with a high school diploma are the most numerous, with 21,924 people, followed by skilled workers with 20,073 people.

According to economic activity, almost half of the population is employed, 39,639 people, the second most significant group is inactive earners, who are mainly pensioners, with 20,679 people.

The most significant ethnic groups in the constituency are Slovenians with 1,525 people and Germans with 1,501 people. The proportion of foreign citizens without Hungarian citizenship is 1.4%.

According to religious composition, the largest religion of the residents of the constituency is Roman Catholic (34,846 people), and a significant community is the Calvinist (3,011 people). The number of those not belonging to a religious community is also significant (3,179 people), the second largest group in the constituency after the Roman Catholic religion.

== Sources ==
- ↑ Vjt.: "2011. évi CCIII. törvény az országgyűlési képviselők választásáról". Nemzeti Jogszabálytár. Magyar Közlöny Lap- és Könyvkiadó Kft.
- ↑ KSH: "Az országgyűlési egyéni választókerületek adatai". Népszámlálás 2011. Központi Statisztikai Hivatal.
