= Körmend District =

Körmend District Körmendi járás
- Districts of Hungary
- Coat of arms

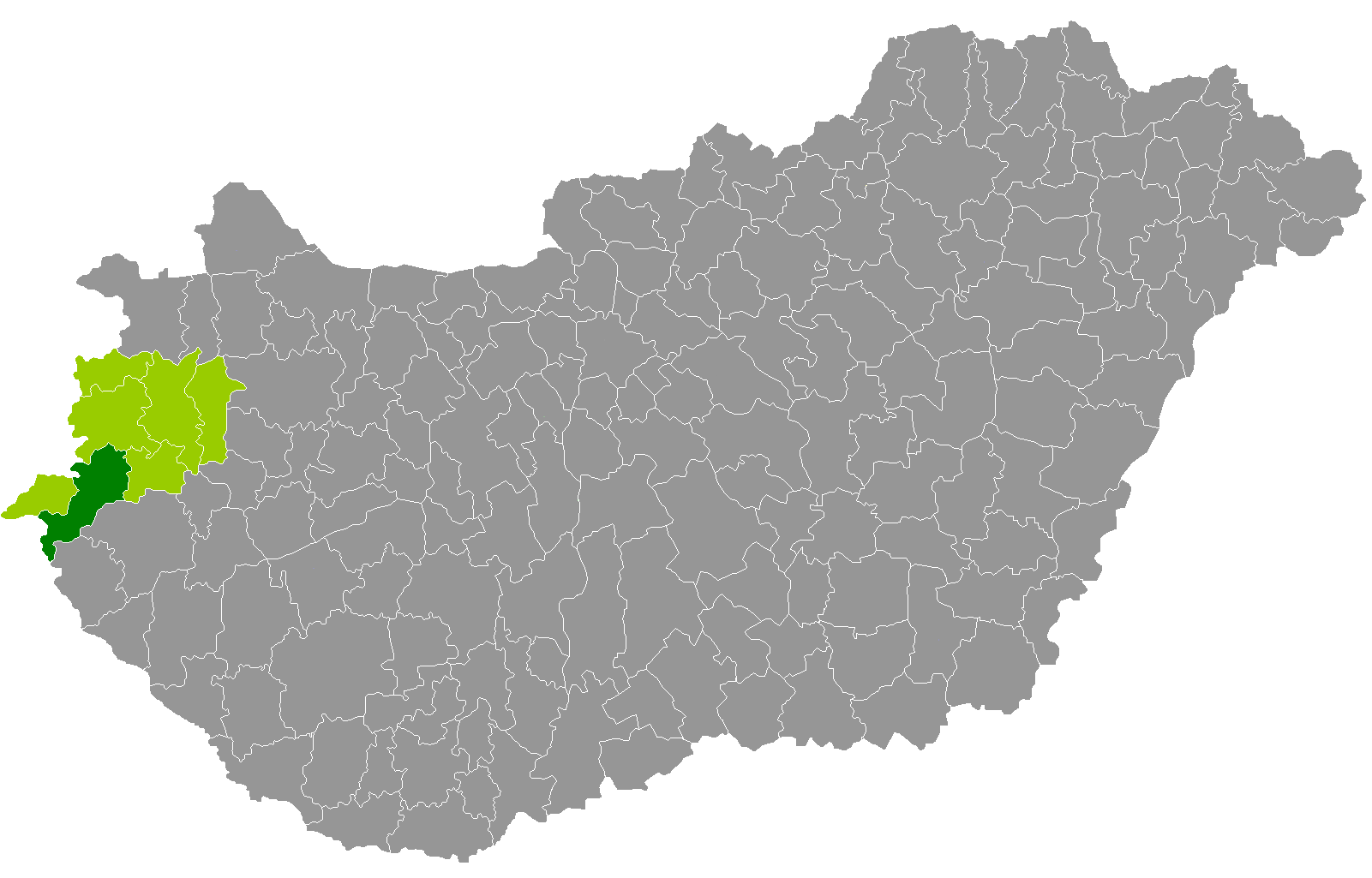
- Körmend District within Hungary and Vas County.
- Coordinates: 47.01°N 16.59°E
- Country: Hungary
- County: Vas
- District seat: Körmend

Area
  - Total: 614.53 km^{2} (237.27 sq mi)
  - Rank: 3rd in Vas

Population (2011 census)
  - Total: 27,177
  - Rank: 3rd in Vas
  - Density: 44/km^{2} (110/sq mi)

Körmend (Hungarian: Körmendi járás) is a district in south-western part of Vas County. Körmend is also the name of the town where the district seat is found. The district is located in the Western Transdanubia Statistical Region.

== Geography ==
Körmend District borders with Szombathely District to the north, Vasvár District to the east, Zalaegerszeg District and Lenti District (Zala County) to the south, Slovenia, Szentgotthárd District and the Austrian state of Burgenland to the west. The number of the inhabited places in Körmend District is 46.

== Municipalities ==
The district has 2 towns and 44 villages. (ordered by population, as of 1 January 2013)

- Bajánsenye (493)
- Csákánydoroszló (1,780)
- Daraboshegy (93)
- Döbörhegy (134)
- Döröske (84)
- Egyházashollós (546)
- Egyházasrádóc (1,315)
- Felsőjánosfa (187)
- Felsőmarác (233)
- Halastó (87)
- Halogy (265)
- Harasztifalu (152)
- Hegyháthodász (160)
- Hegyhátsál (156)
- Hegyhátszentjakab (264)
- Hegyhátszentmárton (65)
- Ispánk (104)
- Ivánc (694)
- Katafa (359)
- Kemestaródfa (210)
- Kercaszomor (203)
- Kerkáskápolna (83)
- Kisrákos (203)
- **Körmend** (11,694) – district seat
- Magyarnádalja (216)
- Magyarszecsőd (440)
- Magyarszombatfa (262)
- Molnaszecsőd (419)
- Nagykölked (155)
- Nagymizdó (114)
- Nagyrákos (260)
- Nádasd (1,332)
- Nemesrempehollós (303)
- Őrimagyarósd (224)
- **Őriszentpéter** (1,189)
- Pankasz (460)
- Pinkamindszent (164)
- Rádóckölked (270)
- Szaknyér (49)
- Szalafő (198)
- Szarvaskend (208)
- Szatta (75)
- Szőce (320)
- Vasalja (311)
- Velemér (77)
- Viszák (255)

The bolded municipalities are cities.

== Demographics ==
Religion in Körmend District (2011 census)
1. Catholic Church (58.0%)
2. Greek Catholicism (0.10%)
3. Calvinism (10.6%)
4. Lutheranism (5.30%)
5. Other religions (0.80%)
6. Non-religious (4.00%)
7. Atheists (0.50%)
8. Undeclared (20.7%)

In 2011, it had a population of 27,177 and the population density was 44/km^{2}.

| Year | County population | Change |
|---|---|---|
| 2011 | 27,177 | n/a |

=== Ethnicity ===
Besides the Hungarian majority, the main minorities are the German (approx. 300) and Roma (250).

Total population (2011 census): 27,177
Ethnic groups (2011 census): Identified themselves: 24,347 persons:

- Hungarians: 23,538 (96.68%)
- Germans: 313 (1.29%)
- Gypsies: 259 (1.06%)
- Others and indefinable: 231 (0.95%)

Approx. 3,000 persons in Körmend District did not declare their ethnic group at the 2011 census.

=== Religion ===
Religious adherence in the county according to 2011 census:

- Catholic – 15,792 (Roman Catholic – 15,766; Greek Catholic – 21);
- Reformed – 2,871;
- Evangelical – 1,447;
- other religions – 210;
- Non-religious – 1,091;
- Atheism – 131;
- Undeclared – 5,635.

== See also ==
- List of cities and towns in Hungary
