= Felsőmarác =

- Location of Vas county in Hungary

- Location of Felsőmarác
- Coordinates: 46.92997°N 16.51814°E
- Country: Hungary
- County: Vas
- District: Körmend

Government
  - Mayor: Horváthné Tánczos Szilvia (Ind.)

Area
  - Total: 17.44 km^{2} (6.73 sq mi)

Population (2022)
  - Total: 253
  - Density: 14.5/km^{2} (37.6/sq mi)
- Time zone: UTC+1 (CET)
  - Summer (DST): UTC+2 (CEST)
- Postal code: 9918
- Area code: 94

Felsőmarác is a village in Vas County, Hungary, lying east of Ivánc.
