= Csörötnek =

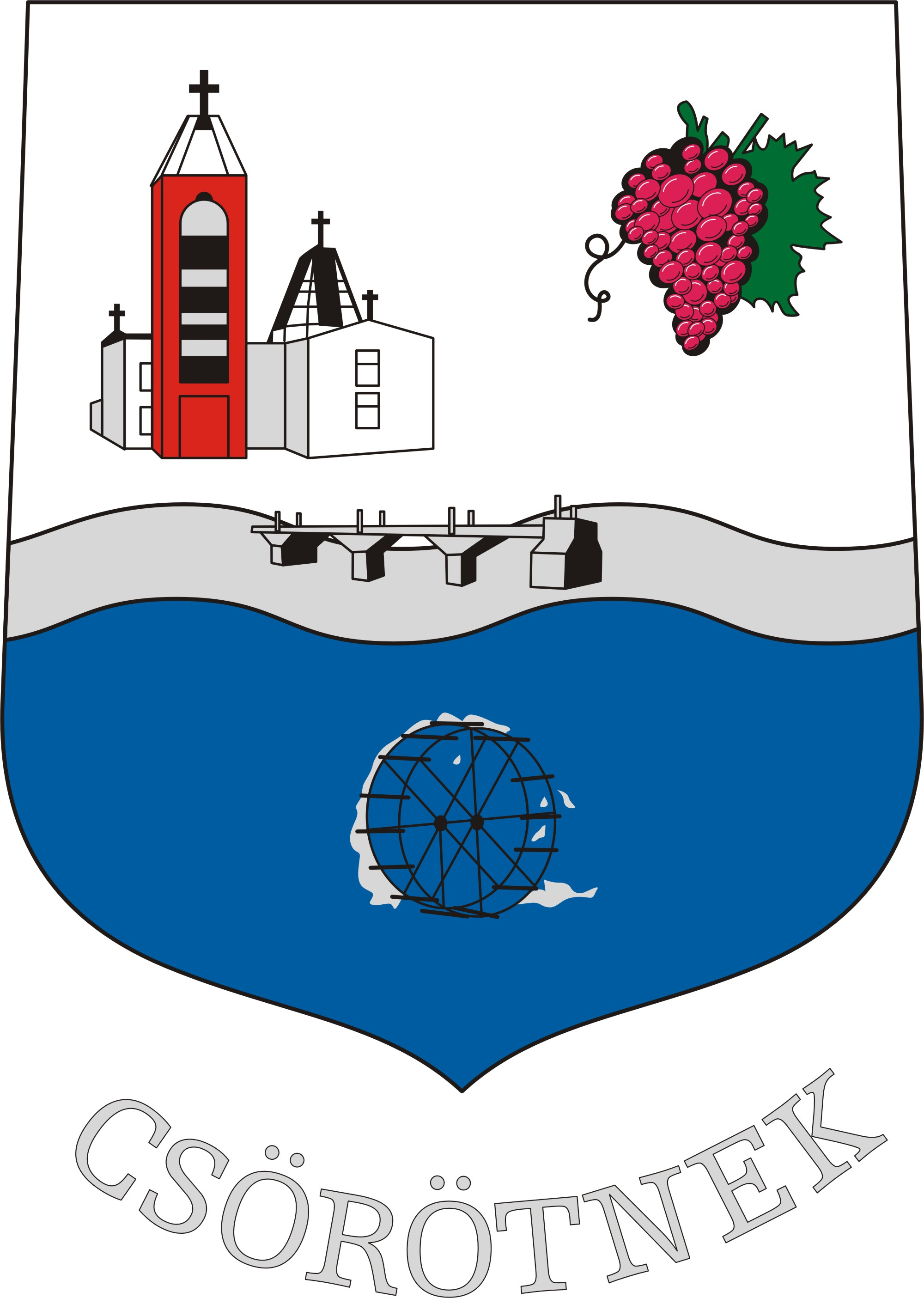
- Coat of arms

- Location of Csörötnek
- Coordinates: 46.95063°N 16.36416°E
- Country: Hungary
- County: Vas

Area
  - Total: 20.53 km^{2} (7.93 sq mi)

Population (2004)
  - Total: 935
  - Density: 45.54/km^{2} (117.9/sq mi)
- Time zone: UTC+1 (CET)
  - Summer (DST): UTC+2 (CEST)
- Postal code: 9962
- Area code: 94

Csörötnek (Slovene: Čretnik, German: Schriedling) is a village in Vas County, Hungary.

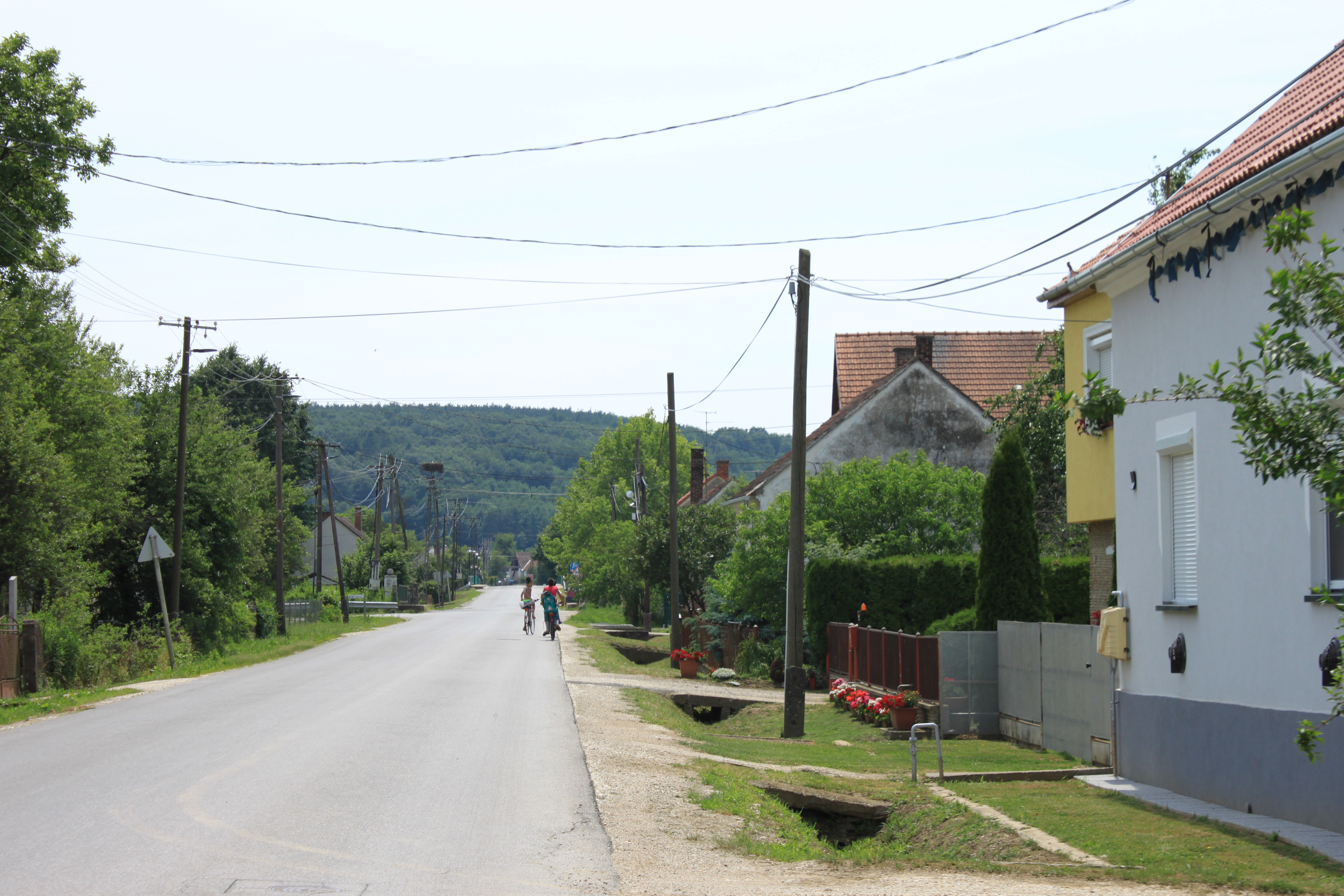
Csörötnek (Vas); Fö út (Main Road)

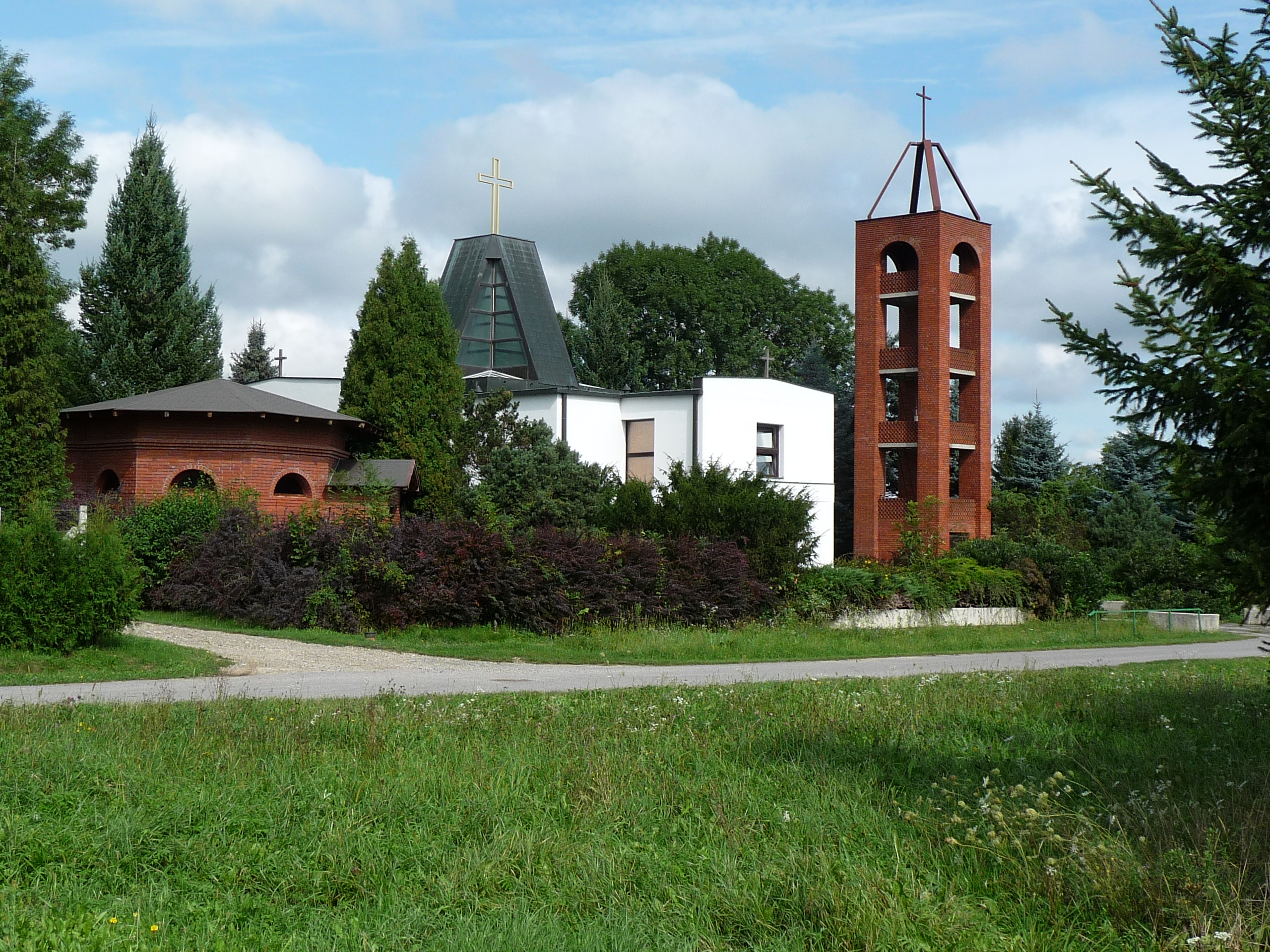
Csörötnek, Catholic Church of the eternal word
