= Kemeneskápolna =

- Location of Vas county in Hungary

- Location of Kemeneskápolna
- Coordinates: 47.20861°N 17.10705°E
- Country: Hungary
- County: Vas

Area
  - Total: 4.97 km^{2} (1.92 sq mi)
- Elevation: 129 m (423 ft)

Population (2010)
  - Total: 87
  - Density: 18/km^{2} (45/sq mi)
- Time zone: UTC+1 (CET)
  - Summer (DST): UTC+2 (CEST)
- Postal code: 9553
- Area code: 95

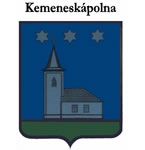
The coat of arms of the village

Kemeneskápolna is a village in Vas county, Hungary.
