= Alsóújlak =

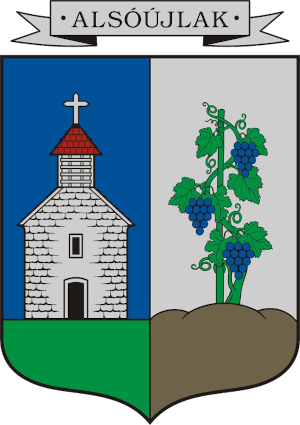
- Coat of arms

- Location of Vas county in Hungary

- Location of Alsóújlak
- Coordinates: 47.08234°N 16.85271°E
- Country: Hungary
- County: Vas

Government
  - Mayor: Kántorné Varga Mónika (Ind.)

Area
  - Total: 21.02 km^{2} (8.12 sq mi)

Population (2022)
  - Total: 537
  - Density: 25.5/km^{2} (66.2/sq mi)
- Time zone: UTC+1 (CET)
  - Summer (DST): UTC+2 (CEST)
- Postal code: 9842
- Area code: 94

Alsóújlak is a village in Vas County, Hungary.

== Notable people ==
- Ferenc Szabó (1921–2009), footballer
