= Vas County =

County of Hungary

Coordinates: 47°10′N 16°45′E

Vas County Vas megye
- Counties of Hungary
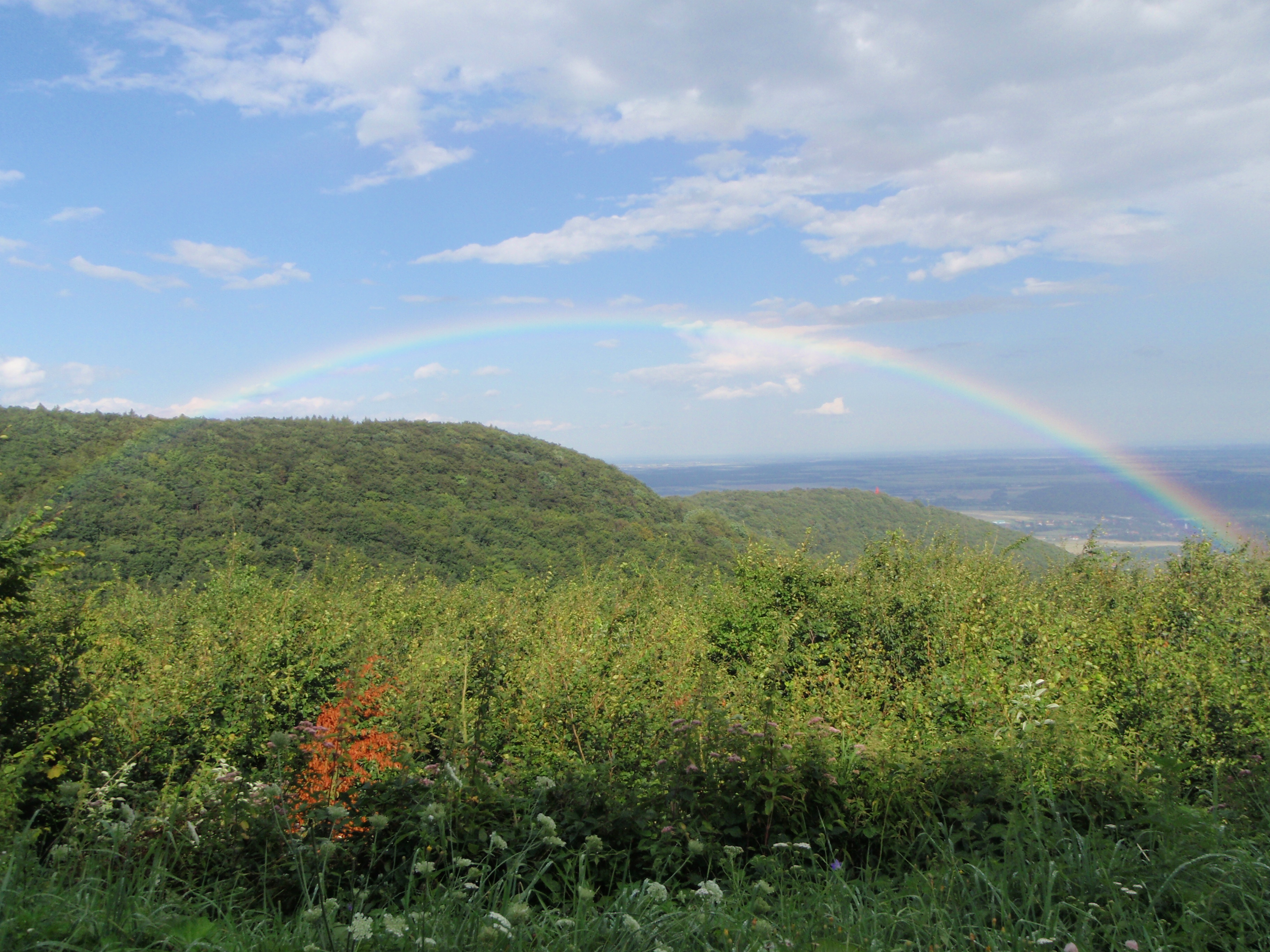
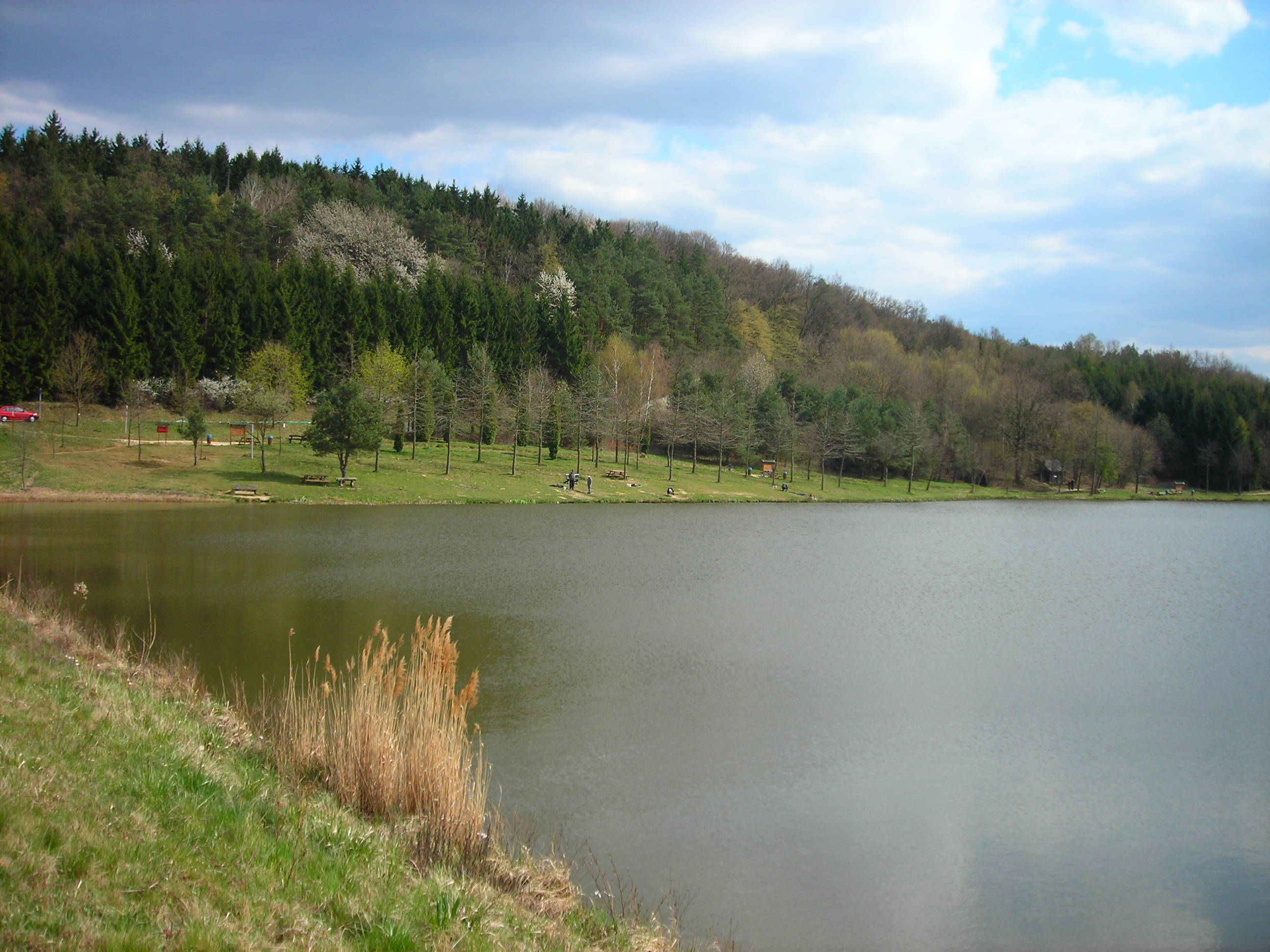
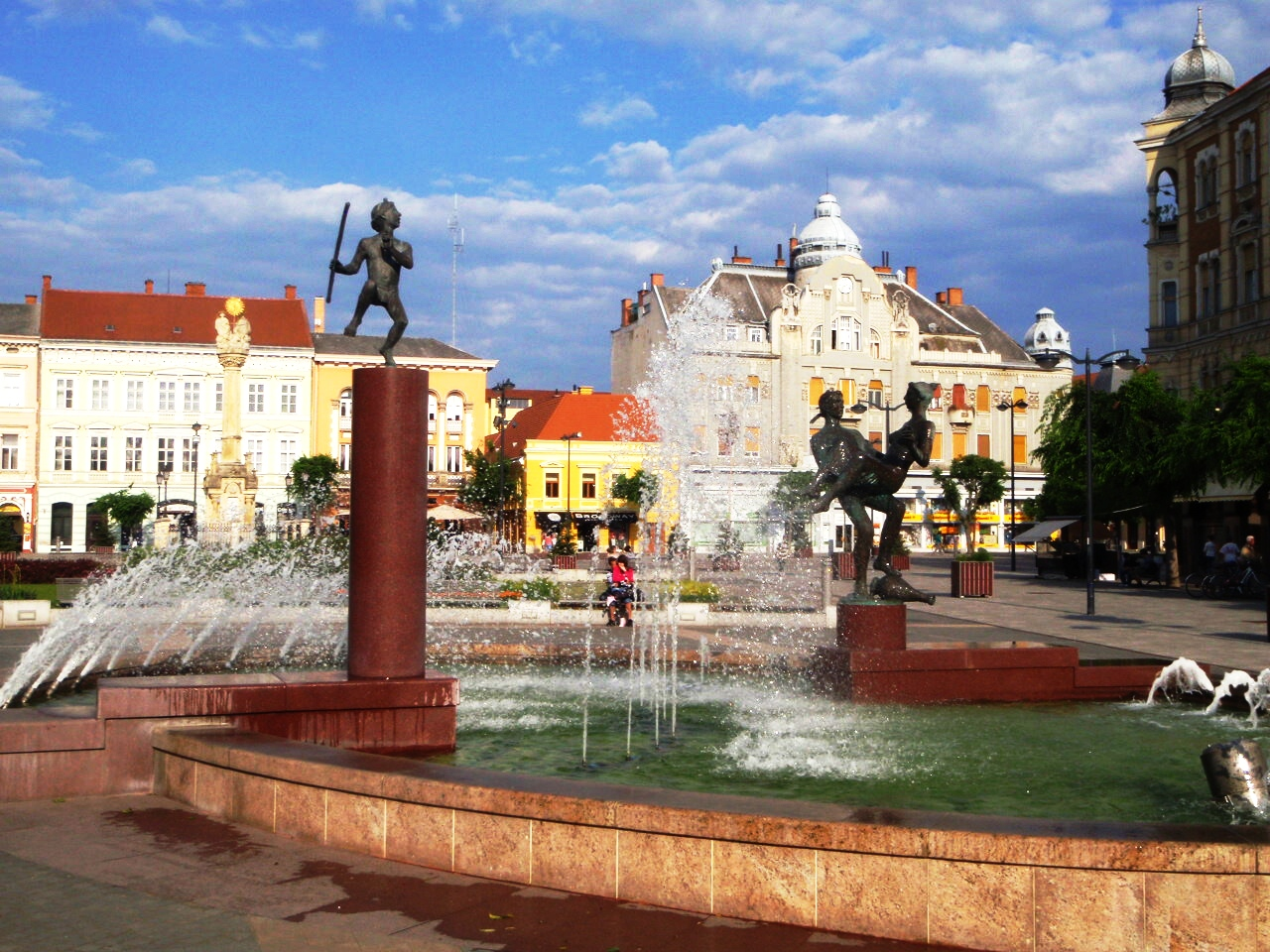
- Descending, from top: Hills near Kőszeg, Landscape in Őrség, and Downtown of Szombathely

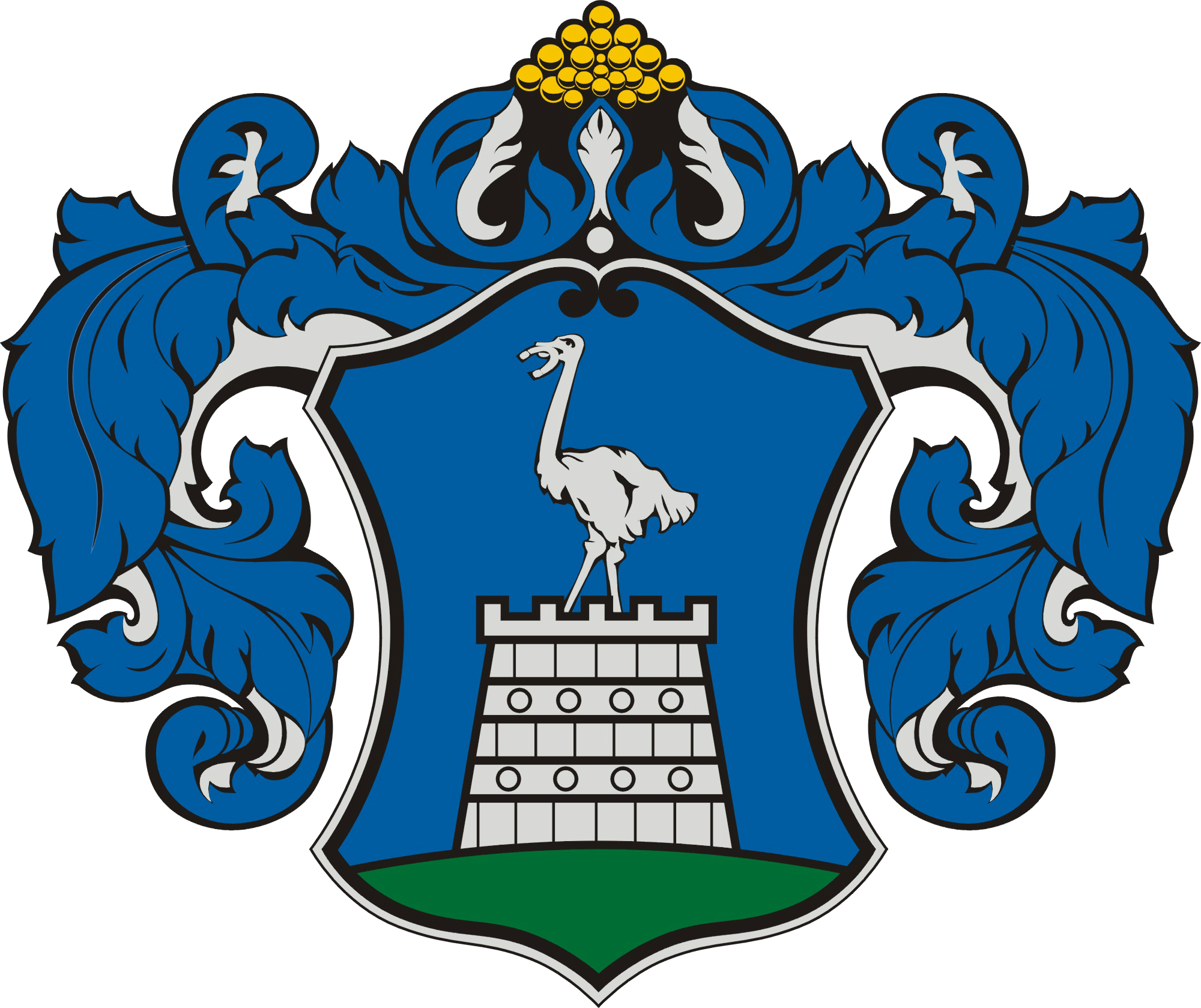
- Flag Coat of arms

- Vas County within Hungary
- Country: Hungary
- Region: Western Transdanubia
- County seat: Szombathely
- Districts: 7 districts: Celldömölk District; Körmend District; Kőszeg District; Sárvár District; Szentgotthárd District; Szombathely District; Vasvár District

Government
  - Body: Vas County Assembly
  - President of the General Assembly: László Majthényi (Fidesz-KDNP)

Area
  - Total: 3,336.14 km^{2} (1,288.09 sq mi)
  - Rank: 17th in Hungary

Population (2018)
  - Total: 253,305
  - Rank: 17th in Hungary
  - Density: 75.9276/km^{2} (196.652/sq mi)

GDP
  - Total: HUF 904 billion €2.905 billion (2016)
- Postal code: 95xx – 99xx
- Area code(s): (+36) 94, 95
- ISO 3166 code: HU-VA
- Website: www.vasmegye.hu

Vas (Hungarian: Vas megye, pronounced [ˈvɒʃ]; German: Komitat Eisenburg; Slovene: Železna županija or županija Železna; Croatian: Željezna županija) is an administrative county (comitatus or megye) of Hungary. It was also one of the counties of the former Kingdom of Hungary. It is part of the Centrope Project.

== Geography ==
Vas County lies in western Hungary. It shares borders with Austria (Burgenland), Slovenia (Mura Statistical Region), and the Hungarian counties of Győr-Moson-Sopron, Veszprém, and Zala. The capital of Vas County is Szombathely. Its area is 3,336 km².

== History ==
Vas is also the name of a historic administrative county (comitatus) of the Kingdom of Hungary. Its territory is now in western Hungary, eastern Austria, and eastern Slovenia. The capital of the county was Szombathely.

Vas County arose as one of the first comitatus of the Kingdom of Hungary.

In 1920, by the Treaty of Trianon the western part of the county became part of the new Austrian land Burgenland, and a smaller part in the southwest, known as Vendvidék, became part of the newly formed Kingdom of Serbs, Croats and Slovenes (later renamed to Yugoslavia). In the Vendvidék in 1919 was founded an unrecognized state the Prekmurje Republic, similar to Burgenland the Lajtabánság. The remainder stayed in Hungary, as the present Hungarian county Vas. After World War II due to Communist reforms, a small part of the former Sopron county went to Vas County, some villages north of Zalaegerszeg went to Zala county, and a small region west of Pápa went to Veszprém county.

Since 1991, when Slovenia became independent from Yugoslavia, the Yugoslav part of the former Vas County (around Murska Sobota) is part of Slovenia.

Vas County is home to a small Slovene minority, which lives in the area between the town of Szentgotthárd and the Slovenian border (see Hungarian Slovenes).

== Demographics ==
Religion in Vas County (2022 census – of those who declared their religion (64.0%))
1. Roman Catholic (72.9%)
2. Lutheran (8.10%)
3. Calvinistic (4.30%)
4. Other Christian denomination (4.00%)
5. Other religion (0.30%)
6. Not religious (10.4%)

In 2015, the county had a population of 253,997 and the population density was 76/km².

Year	County population	Change
1949	283,070	n/a
1960	▼282,728	-0.12%
1970	▼277,619	-1.81%
1980	▲285,498	2.84%
1990	▼275,944	-3.35%
2001	▼268,123	-2.83%
2011	▼256,629	-4.29%
2015	▼253,997	-1.03%
2018	▼253,305	-0.27%

=== Ethnicity ===
Besides the Hungarian majority, the main minorities are the Croats (approx. 3,000), Roma (2,500), Germans (2,000) and Slovenes (1,500).

Total population (2011 census): 256,629
Ethnic groups (2011 census): Identified themselves: 225 052 persons:

- Hungarians: 214 512 (95.32%)
- Croats: 3 102 (1.38%)
- Gypsies: 2 559 (1.14%)
- Others and indefinable: 4 879 (2.17%)

Approx. 39,000 persons in Vas County did not declare their ethnic group at the 2011 census.

=== Religion ===
Religious adherence in the county according to 2011 census:

- Catholic – 150,912 (Roman Catholic – 150,575; Greek Catholic – 276);
- Evangelical – 15,135;
- Reformed – 7,113;
- other religions – 2,087;
- Non-religious – 13,621;
- Atheism – 1,895;
- Undeclared – 65,866.

== Regional structure ==
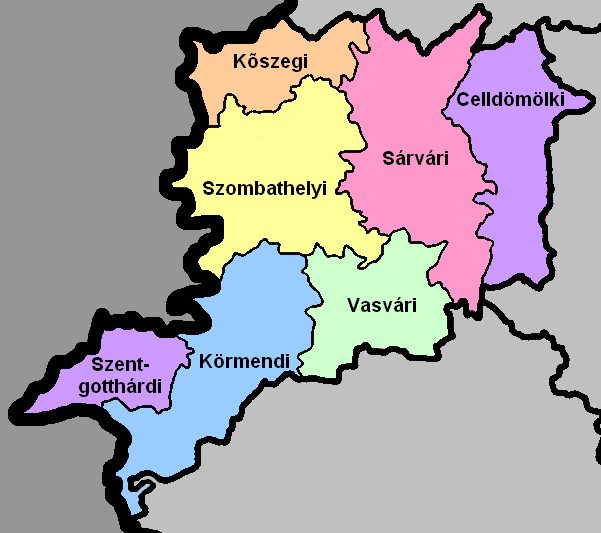
District of Vas County

No.	English and Hungarian names	Area (km²)	Population (2011)	Density (pop./km²)	Seat	No. of municipalities
1	Celldömölk District; Celldömölki járás	474.13	24,630	52	Celldömölk	28
2	Körmend District; Körmendi járás	614.53	27,177	44	Körmend	46
3	Kőszeg District; Kőszegi járás	286.45	25,090	88	Kőszeg	21
4	Sárvár District; Sárvári járás	685.46	38,684	56	Sárvár	42
5	Szentgotthárd District; Szentgotthárdi járás	255.04	14,961	59	Szentgotthárd	16
6	Szombathely District; Szombathelyi járás	646.36	112,320	174	Szombathely	40
7	Vasvár District; Vasvári járás	374.14	13,767	37	Vasvár	23
Vas County		3,336.14	256,629	78	Szombathely	216

== Politics ==
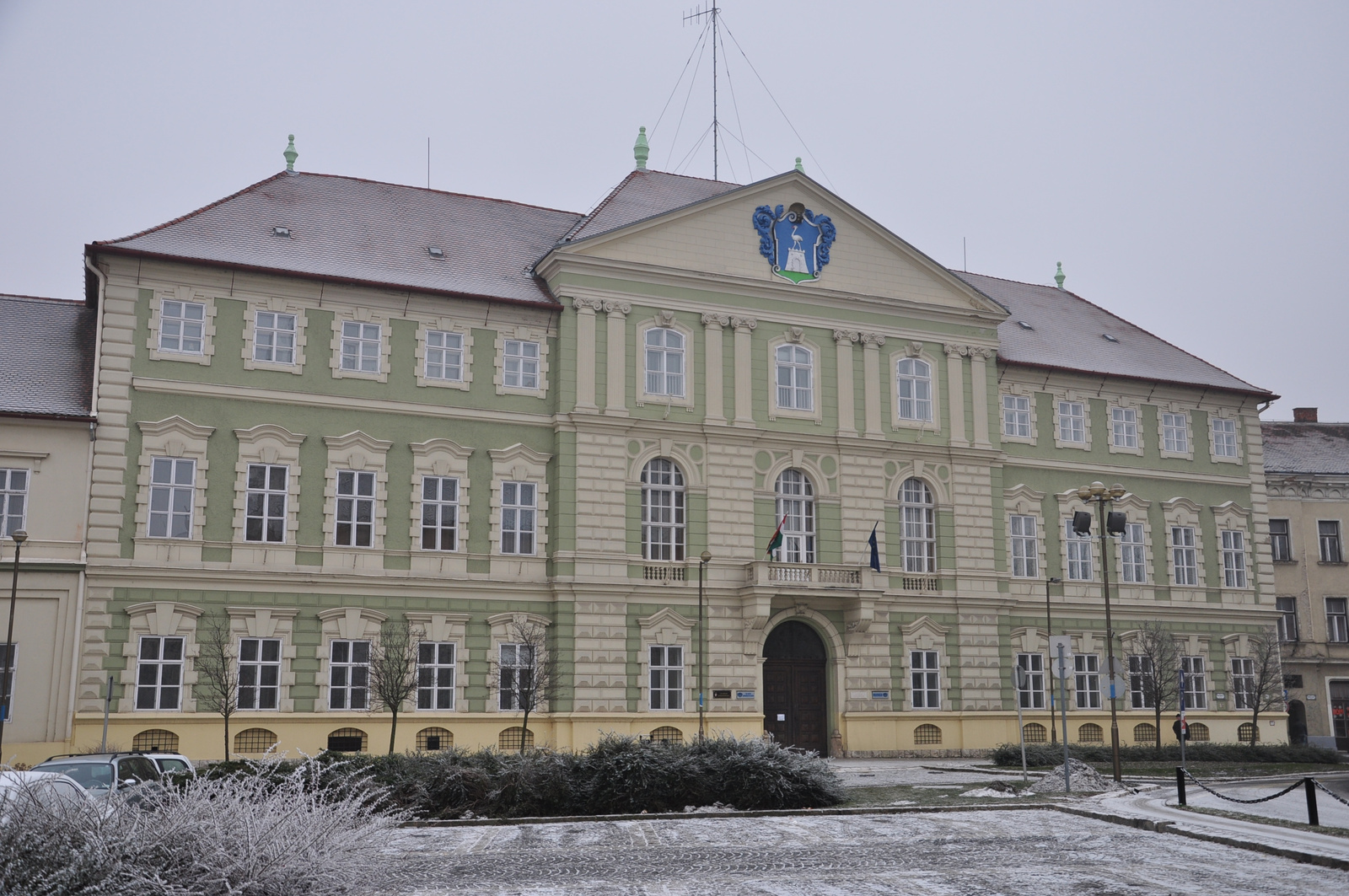
Countyhall of Vas.

The Vas County Council, elected at the 2014 local government elections, is made up of 15 counselors, with the following party composition:

Party	Seats	Current County Assembly
Fidesz-KDNP	10	
Movement for a Better Hungary (Jobbik)	2	
Hungarian Socialist Party (MSZP)	2	
Mayors Association for Vas County (PVME)	1	

=== Presidents of the General Assembly ===
List of presidents since 1990
Gyula Pusztai (MSZP)	1990–1998
Péter Markó (Fidesz)	1998–2006
Ferenc Kovács (Fidesz-KDNP)	2006–2014
László Majthényi (Fidesz-KDNP)	2014–

== Municipalities ==
Vas County has 1 urban county, 12 towns and 203 villages.

City with county rights

(ordered by population, as of 2011 census)

- Szombathely (78,884) – county seat

Towns

- Sárvár (14,777)
- Körmend (11,950)
- Kőszeg (11,666)
- Celldömölk (11,113)
- Szentgotthárd (8,678)
- Vasvár (4,387)
- Vép (3,534)
- Bük (3,301)
- Csepreg (3,286)
- Répcelak (2,575)
- Jánosháza (2,529)
- Őriszentpéter (1,178)

Villages

- Acsád
- Alsószölnök
- Alsóújlak
- Andrásfa
- Apátistvánfalva
- Bajánsenye
- Balogunyom
- Bejcgyertyános
- Bérbaltavár
- Boba
- Borgáta
- Bozsok
- Bozzai
- Bögöt
- Bögöte
- Bő
- Bucsu
- Cák
- Chernelházadamonya
- Csákánydoroszló
- Csánig
- Csehi
- Csehimindszent
- Csempeszkopács
- Csénye
- Csipkerek
- Csönge
- Csörötnek
- Daraboshegy
- Dozmat
- Döbörhegy
- Döröske
- Duka
- Egervölgy
- Egyházashetye
- Egyházashollós
- Egyházasrádóc
- Felsőcsatár
- Felsőjánosfa
- Felsőmarác
- Felsőszölnök
- Gasztony
- Gencsapáti
- Gersekarát
- Gérce
- Gór
- Gyanógeregye
- Gyöngyösfalu
- Győrvár
- Halastó
- Halogy
- Harasztifalu
- Hegyfalu
- Hegyháthodász
- Hegyhátsál
- Hegyhátszentjakab
- Hegyhátszentmárton
- Hegyhátszentpéter
- Horvátlövő
- Horvátzsidány
- Hosszúpereszteg
- Ikervár
- Iklanberény
- Ispánk
- Ivánc
- Ják
- Jákfa
- Karakó
- Katafa
- Káld
- Kám
- Keléd
- Kemeneskápolna
- Kemenesmagasi
- Kemenesmihályfa
- Kemenespálfa
- Kemenessömjén
- Kemenesszentmárton
- Kemestaródfa
- Kenéz
- Kenyeri
- Kercaszomor
- Kerkáskápolna
- Kétvölgy
- Kisrákos
- Kissomlyó
- Kisunyom
- Kiszsidány
- Kondorfa
- Köcsk
- Kőszegdoroszló
- Kőszegpaty
- Kőszegszerdahely
- Lócs
- Lukácsháza
- Magyarlak
- Magyarmádalja
- Magyarszecsőd
- Magyarszombatfa
- Meggyeskovácsi
- Megyehíd
- Mersevát
- Mesterháza
- Mesteri
- Meszlen
- Mikosszéplak
- Molnaszecsőd
- Nagygeresd
- Nagykölked
- Nagymizdó
- Nagyrákos
- Nagysimonyi
- Nagytilaj
- Nádasd
- Nárai
- Narda
- Nemesbőd
- Nemescsó
- Nemeskeresztúr
- Nemeskocs
- Nemeskolta
- Nemesládony
- Nemesmedves
- Nemesrempehollós
- Nick
- Nyőgér
- Olaszfa
- Ostffyasszonyfa
- Oszkó
- Orfalu
- Ólmod
- Ölbő
- Őrimagyarósd
- Pankasz
- Pácsony
- Pápoc
- Pecöl
- Perenye
- Peresznye
- Petőmihályfa
- Pinkamindszent
- Pornóapáti
- Porpác
- Pósfa
- Pusztacsó
- Püspökmolnári
- Rábagyarmat
- Rábahídvég
- Rábapaty
- Rábatöttös
- Rádóckölked
- Rátót
- Répceszentgyörgy
- Rönök
- Rum
- Sajtoskál
- Salköveskút
- Sárfimizdó
- Sé
- Simaság
- Sitke
- Söpte
- Sorkifalud
- Sorkikápolna
- Sorokpolány
- Sótony
- Szaknyér
- Szakonyfalu
- Szalafő
- Szarvaskend
- Szatta
- Szeleste
- Szemenye
- Szentpéterfa
- Szergény
- Szőce
- Tanakajd
- Táplánszentkereszt
- Telekes
- Tokorcs
- Tompaládony
- Tormásliget
- Torony
- Tömörd
- Uraiújfalu
- Vasalja
- Vasasszonyfa
- Vasegerszeg
- Vashosszúfalu
- Vaskeresztes
- Vassurány
- Vasszécseny
- Vasszentmihály
- Vasszilvágy
- Vámoscsalád
- Vásárosmiske
- Vát
- Velem
- Velemér
- Viszák
- Vönöck
- Zsennye
- Zsédeny

== Gallery ==
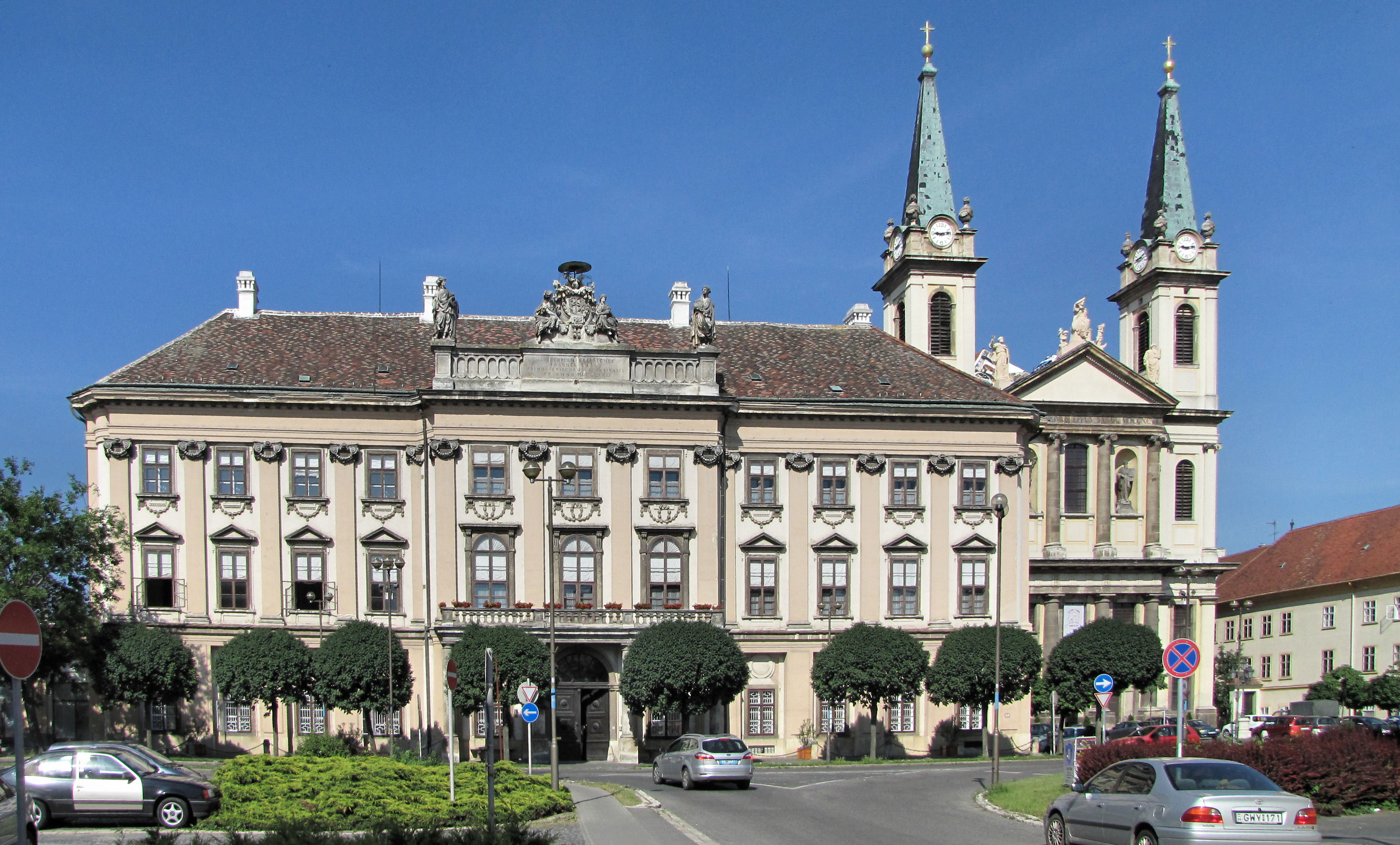
Szombathely, the capital of the county

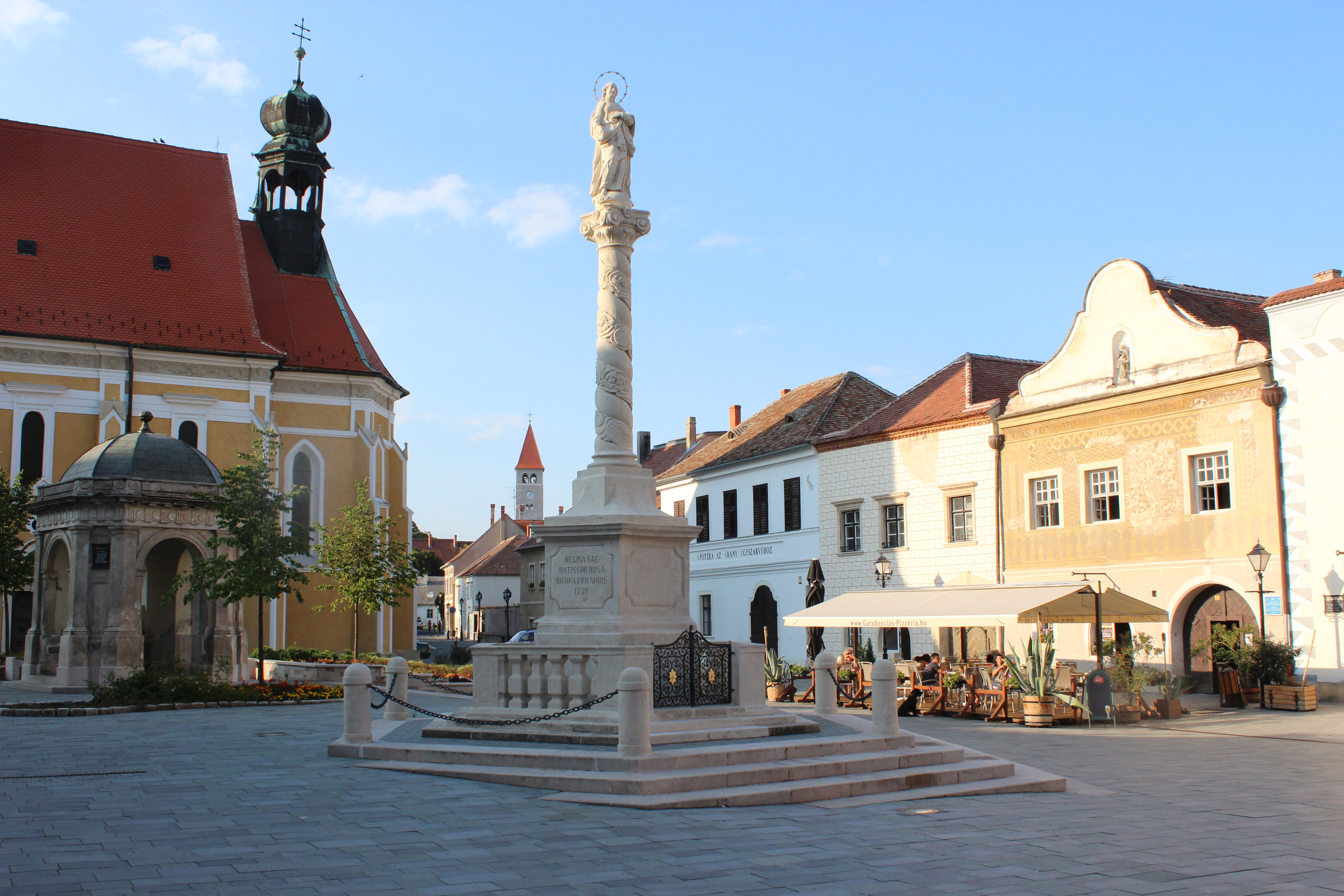
Jurisics Square in Kőszeg

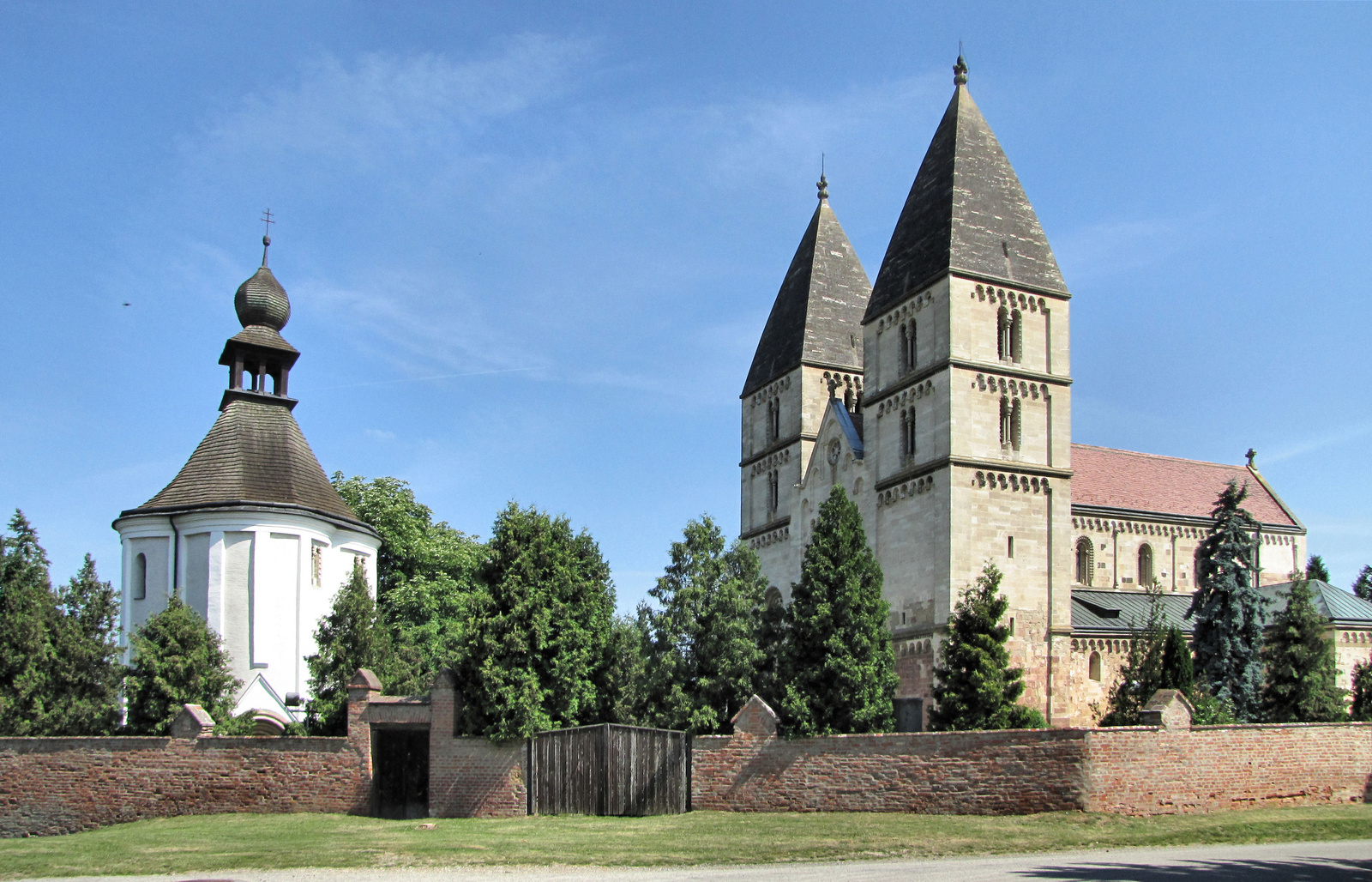
Saint George's Abbey and the Saint James Chapel in Ják

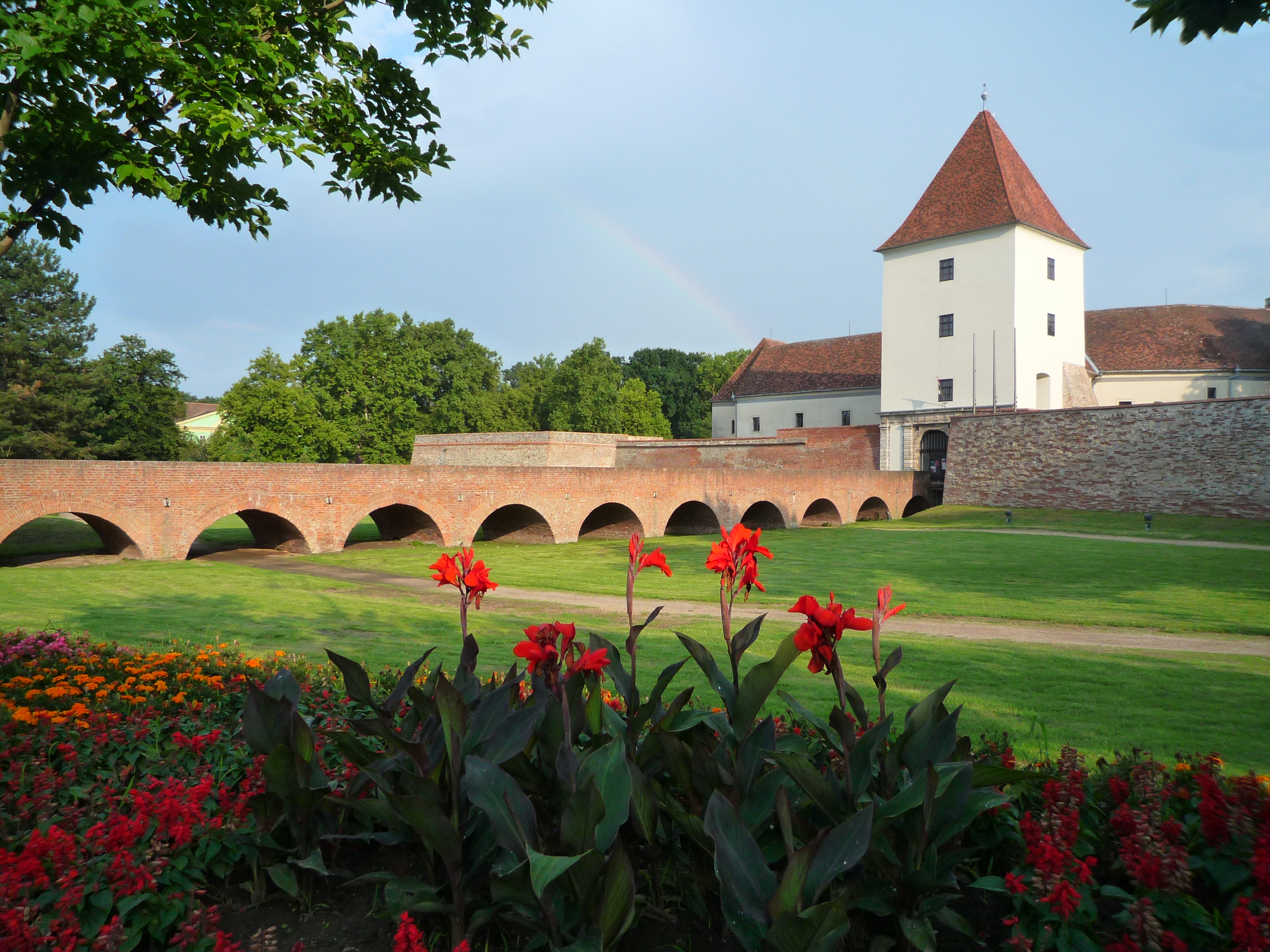
Nádasdy Castle, Sárvár

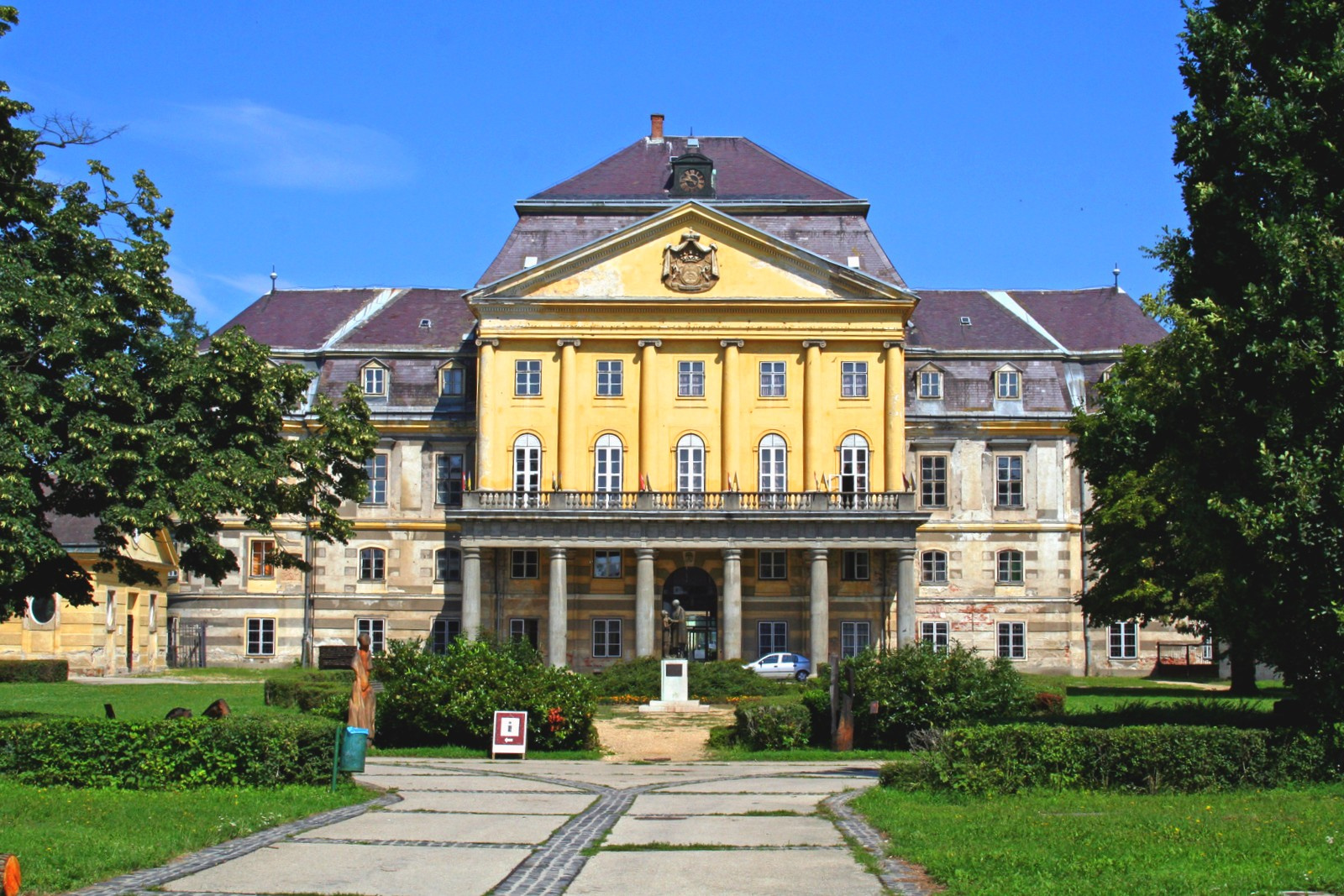
Batthyány Mansion in Körmend

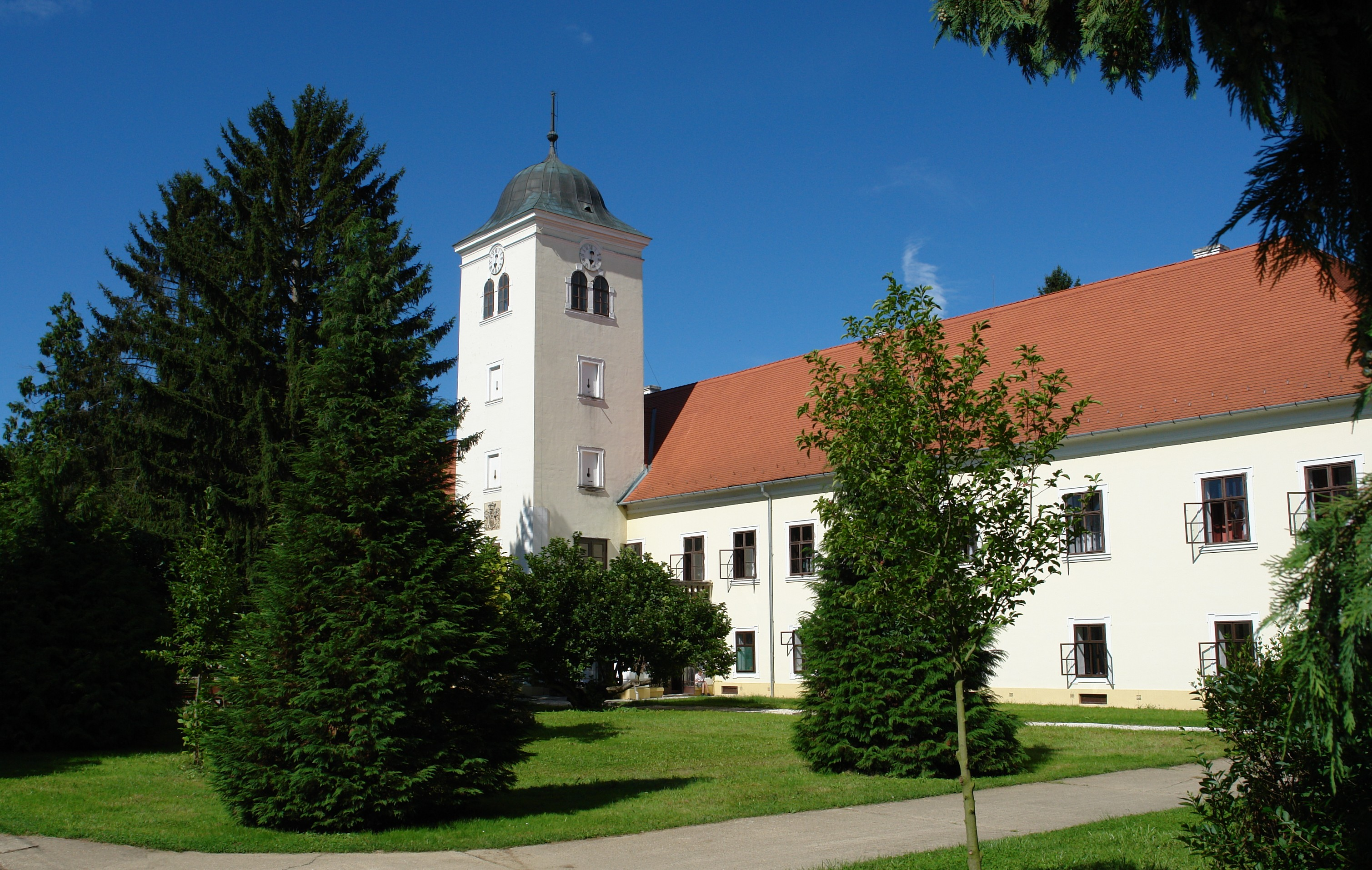
Batthyány Mansion in Csákánydoroszló

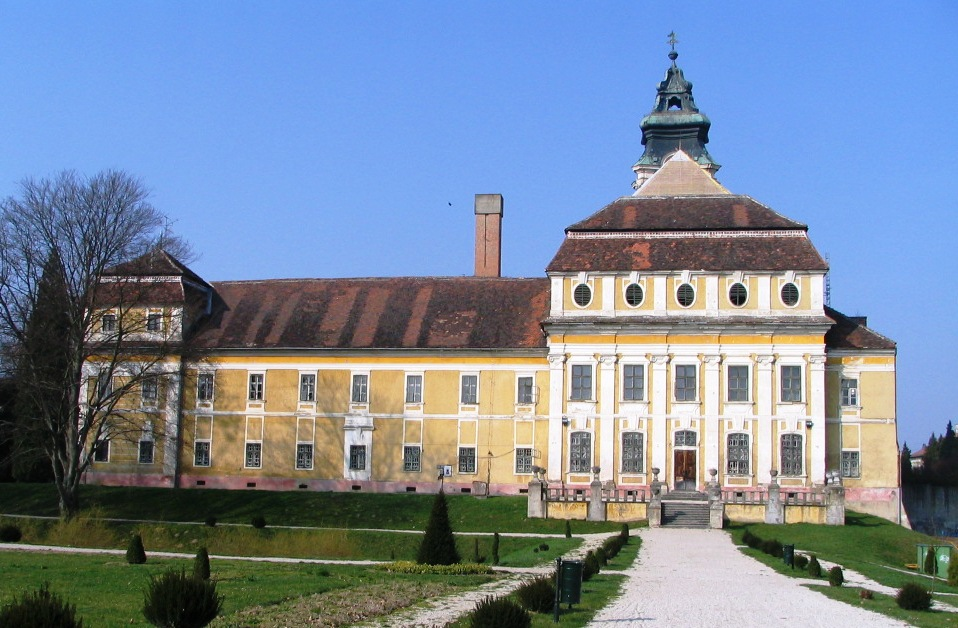
Cistercian Abbey of Szentgotthárd

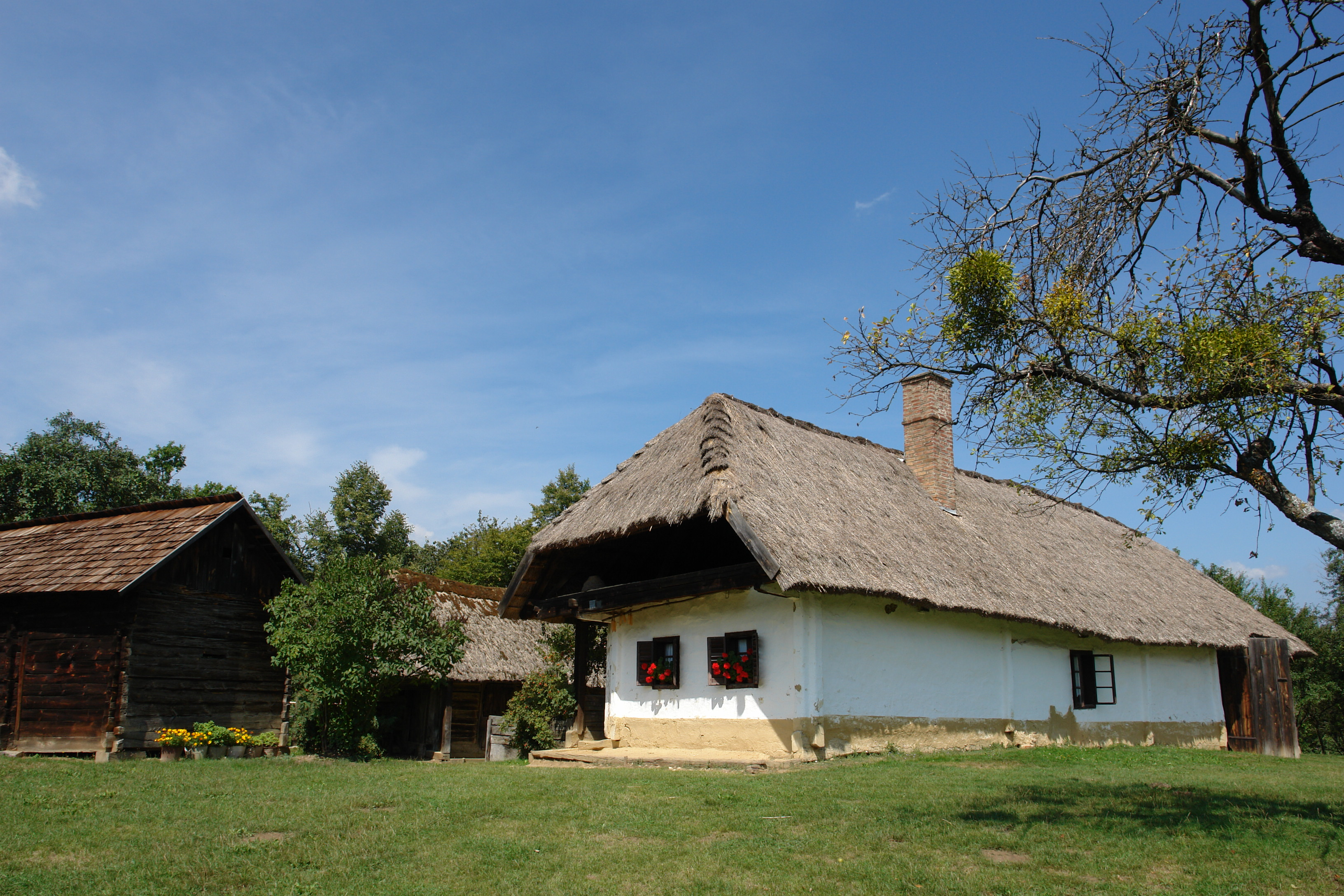
Traditional Hungarian house in Szalafő
