= Szatta =

- Village
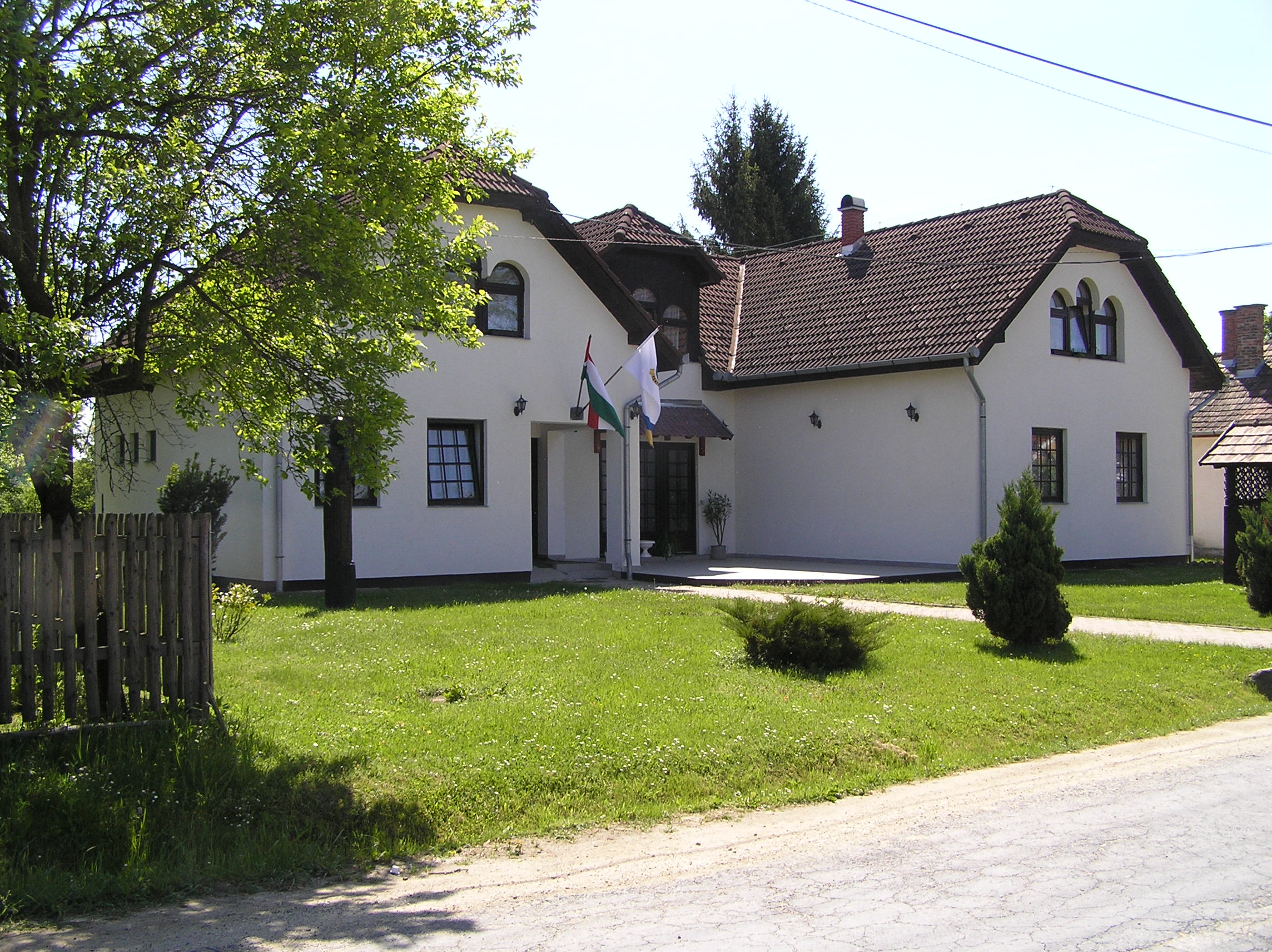

- Flag Coat of arms

- Location of Szatta
- Coordinates: 46.79792°N 16.48008°E
- Country: Hungary
- Region: Western Transdanubia
- County: Vas
- District: Körmend

Area
  - Total: 6.01 km^{2} (2.32 sq mi)

Population (1 January 2026)
  - Total: 63
  - Density: 10/km^{2} (27/sq mi)
- Time zone: UTC+1 (CET)
  - Summer (DST): UTC+2 (CEST)
- Postal code: 9938
- Area code: (+36) 94
- Website: www.szatta.hu

Szatta is a village in Vas county, Hungary.
