= Bögöte =

Village in Vas, Hungary

- Flag Seal

- Location of Vas county in Hungary

- Location of Bögöte
- Coordinates: 47.08802°N 17.04271°E
- Country: Hungary
- County: Vas

Government
  - Mayor: Szabó Tiborné (Ind.)

Area
  - Total: 20.74 km^{2} (8.01 sq mi)

Population (2022)
  - Total: 308
  - Density: 14.9/km^{2} (38.5/sq mi)
- Time zone: UTC+1 (CET)
  - Summer (DST): UTC+2 (CEST)
- Postal code: 9675
- Area code: 95

Bögöte is a village in Vas County, Hungary.
