= Nádasd =

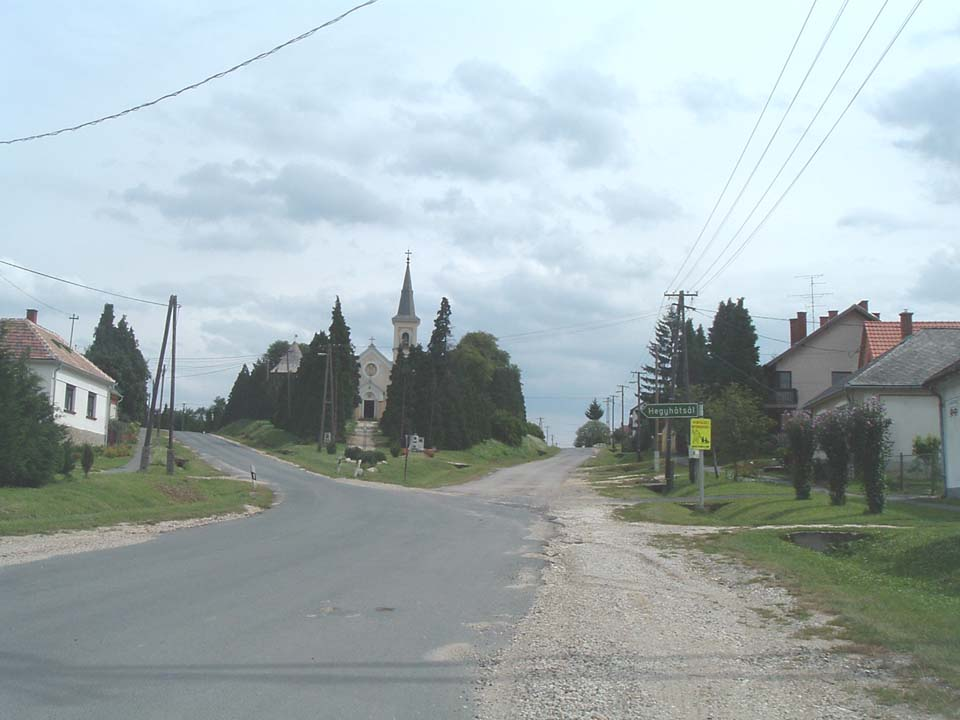

- Coat of arms

- Location of Nádasd in Hungary
- Coordinates: 46°57′55″N 16°36′26″E
- Country: Hungary
- Region: Western Transdanubia
- County: Vas
- District: Körmend
- Rank: Village

Area
  - Total: 35.60 km^{2} (13.75 sq mi)

Population (1 January 2008)
  - Total: 1,342
  - Density: 37.70/km^{2} (97.63/sq mi)
- Time zone: UTC+1 (CET)
  - Summer (DST): UTC+2 (CEST)
- Postal code: 9915
- Area code: +36 94
- KSH code: 06716
- Website: www.nadasd.hu

Nádasd is a village in Vas county, Hungary.
