= Nemesrempehollós =

- Village
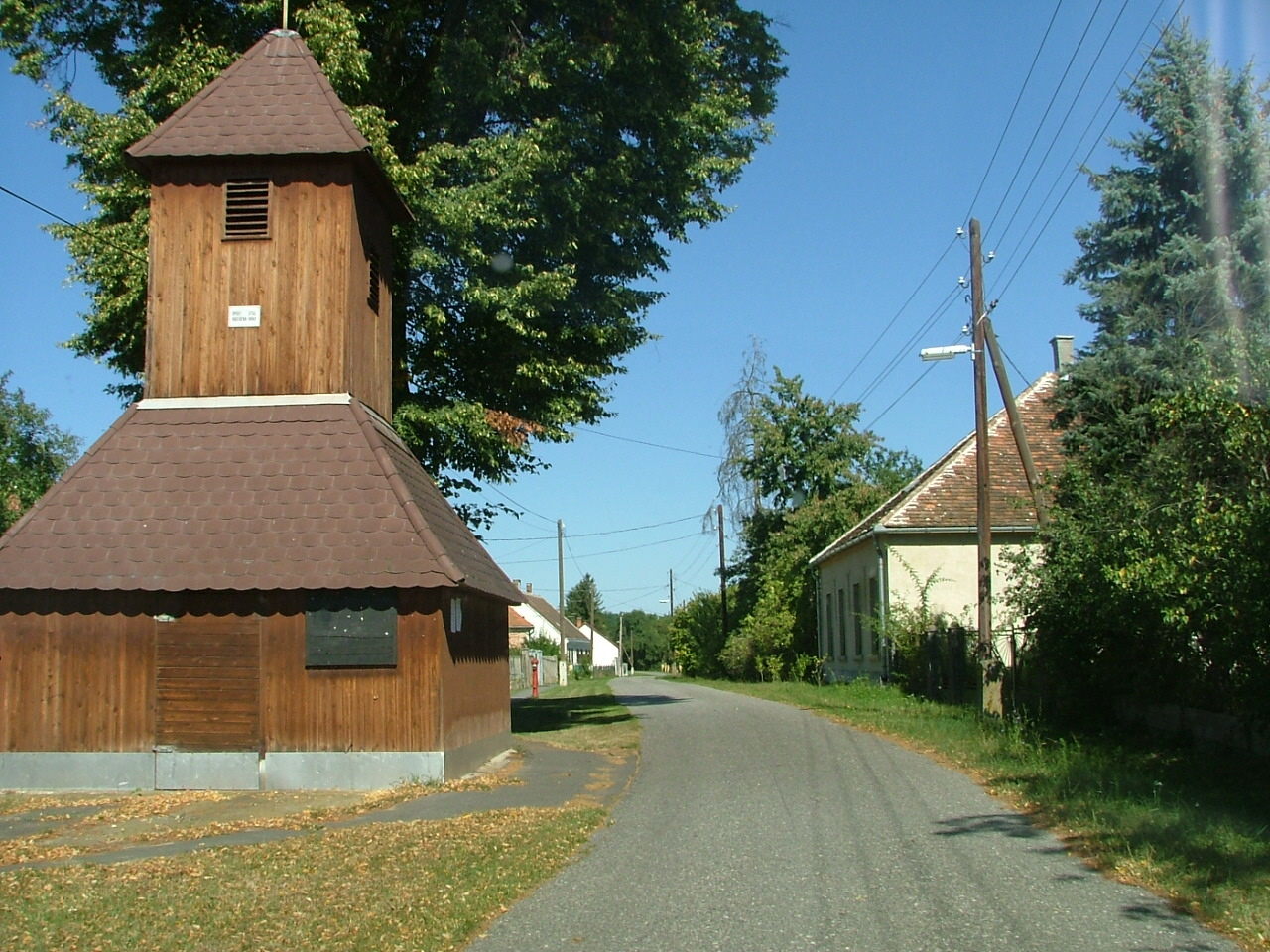

- Flag Coat of arms

- Location of Nemesrempehollós
- Coordinates: 47.09412°N 16.68220°E
- Country: Hungary
- Region: Western Transdanubia
- County: Vas
- District: Körmend

Area
  - Total: 12.05 km^{2} (4.65 sq mi)

Population (1 January 2025)
  - Total: 258
  - Density: 21.4/km^{2} (55.5/sq mi)
- Time zone: UTC+1 (CET)
  - Summer (DST): UTC+2 (CEST)
- Postal code: 9782
- Area code: (+36) 94
- Website: radochollos.hu

Nemesrempehollós is a village in Vas county, Hungary.
