= Nemeskocs =

- Coat of arms

- Location of Vas county in Hungary

- Location of Nemeskocs
- Coordinates: 47.20332°N 17.18497°E
- Country: Hungary
- County: Vas

Area
  - Total: 7.93 km^{2} (3.06 sq mi)

Population (2004)
  - Total: 366
  - Density: 46.15/km^{2} (119.5/sq mi)
- Time zone: UTC+1 (CET)
  - Summer (DST): UTC+2 (CEST)
- Postal code: 9542
- Area code: 95

Nemeskocs is a village in Vas county, Hungary.
