= Hosszúpereszteg =

- Coat of arms

- Location of Vas county in Hungary

- Location of Hosszúpereszteg
- Coordinates: 47.09377°N 17.02675°E
- Country: Hungary
- County: Vas

Area
  - Total: 37.01 km^{2} (14.29 sq mi)

Population (2004)
  - Total: 737
  - Density: 19.91/km^{2} (51.6/sq mi)
- Time zone: UTC+1 (CET)
  - Summer (DST): UTC+2 (CEST)
- Postal code: 9676
- Area code: 95

Hosszúpereszteg is a village in Vas county, Hungary.
