= Borgáta =

- Flag Coat of arms

- Location of Vas County in Hungary

- Location of Borgáta
- Coordinates: 47.16199°N 17.07767°E
- Country: Hungary
- County: Vas

Government
  - Mayor: Gőcze Zsanett (Ind.)

Area
  - Total: 6.21 km^{2} (2.40 sq mi)

Population (2022)
  - Total: 178
  - Density: 28.7/km^{2} (74.2/sq mi)
- Time zone: UTC+1 (CET)
  - Summer (DST): UTC+2 (CEST)
- Postal code: 9554
- Area code: 95

Borgáta is a village in Vas County, Hungary.
