= Nemesmedves =

- Location of Vas county in Hungary
- Country: Hungary
- County: Vas

Area
  - Total: 4.74 km^{2} (1.83 sq mi)

Population (2004)
  - Total: 20
  - Density: 4.21/km^{2} (10.9/sq mi)
- Time zone: UTC+1 (CET)
  - Summer (DST): UTC+2 (CEST)
- Postal code: 9953
- Area code: 94

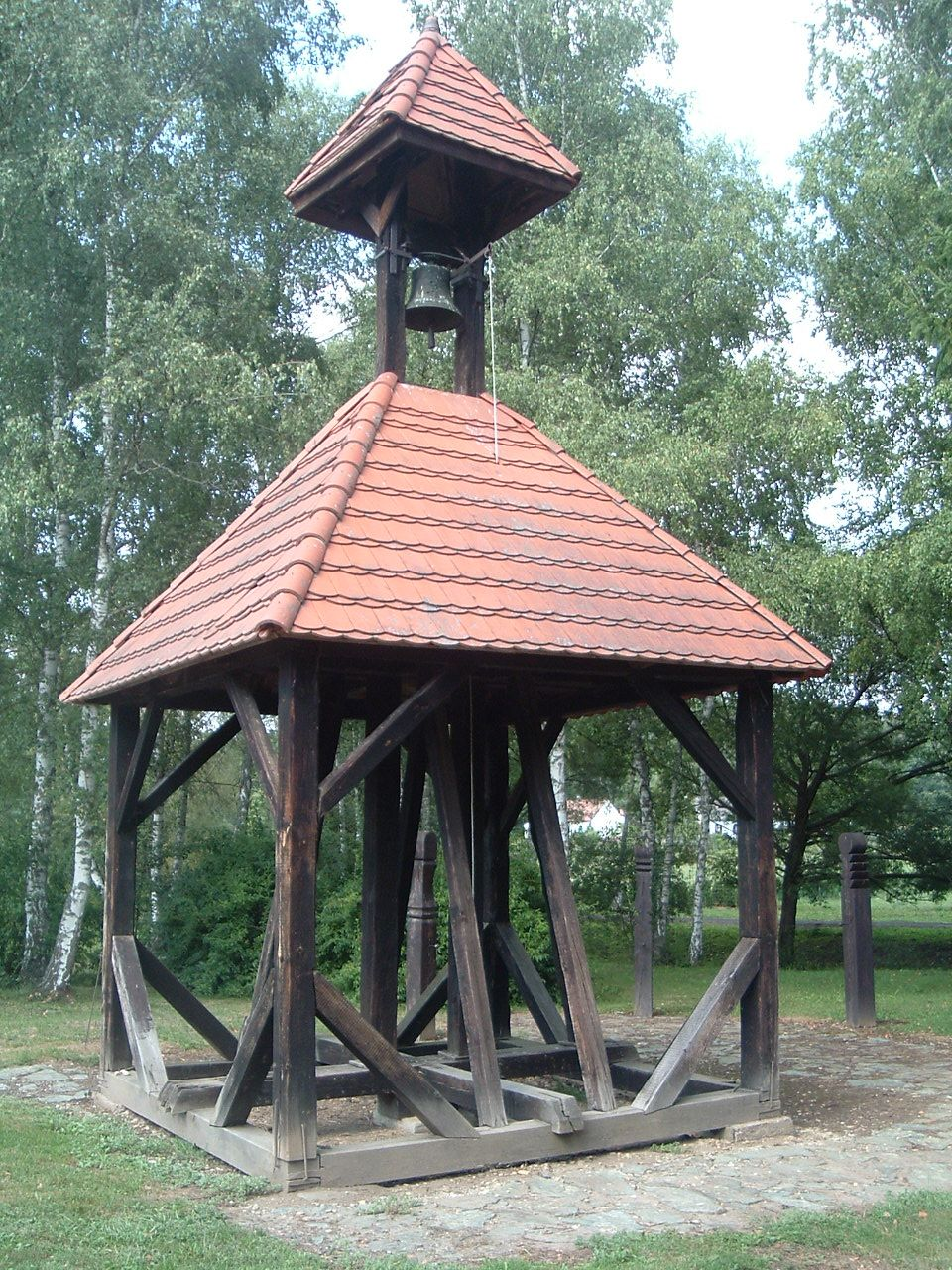
Nemesmedves

Nemesmedves (German: Ginisdorf) is a village in Vas county, Hungary.
