= Kisunyom =

- Location of Vas county in Hungary

- Location of Kisunyom
- Coordinates: 47.14660°N 16.64205°E
- Country: Hungary
- County: Vas

Area
  - Total: 10 km^{2} (3.9 sq mi)

Population (2004)
  - Total: 388
  - Density: 38.8/km^{2} (100/sq mi)
- Time zone: UTC+1 (CET)
  - Summer (DST): UTC+2 (CEST)
- Postal code: 9772
- Area code: 94

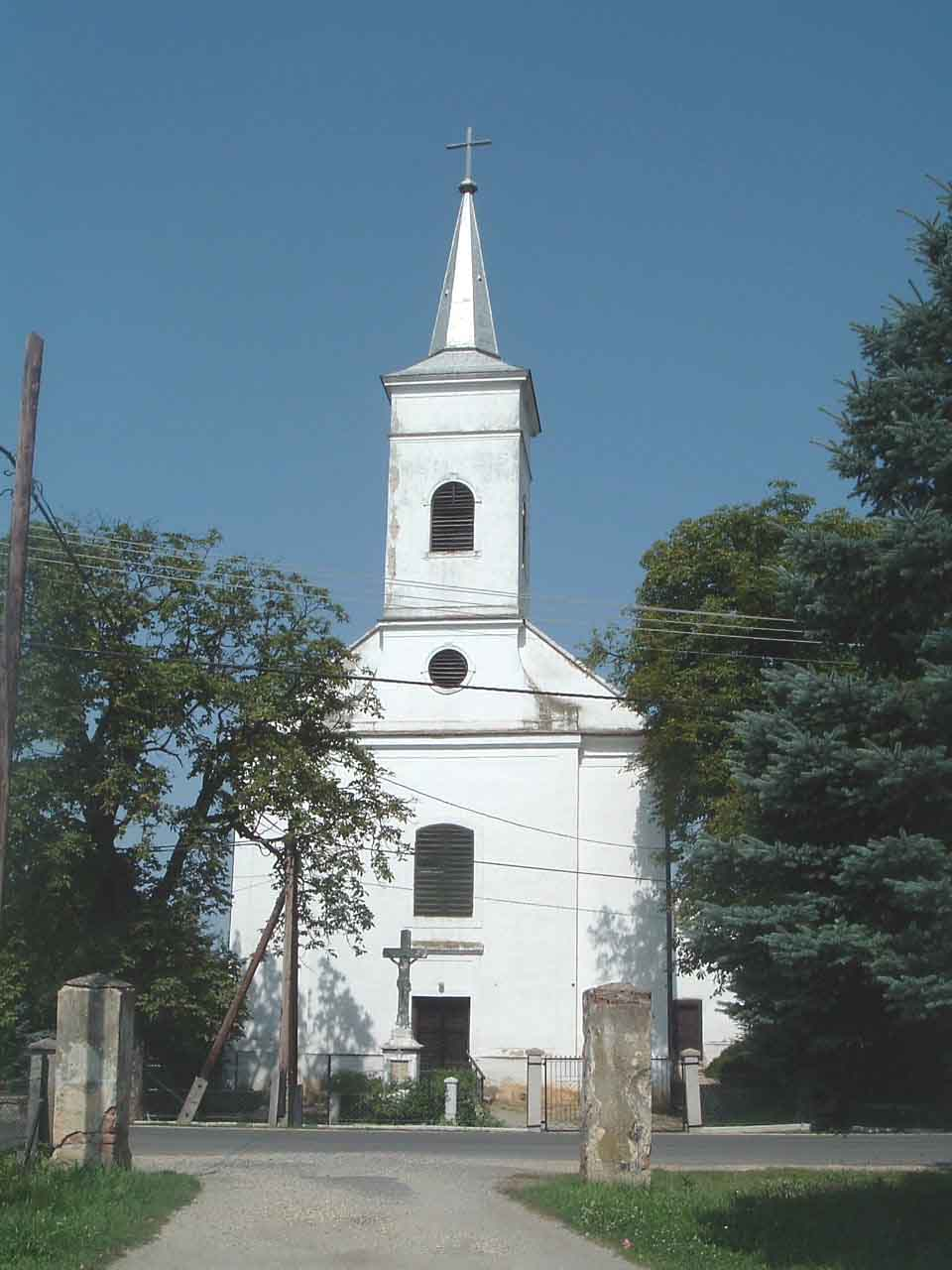
Kisunyom2v.jpg

Kisunyom is a village in Vas county, Hungary.
