= Egervölgy =

Village in Vas, Hungary

- Location of Vas county in Hungary

- Location of Egervölgy
- Coordinates: 47.11839°N 16.90903°E
- Country: Hungary
- County: Vas

Area
  - Total: 8.86 km^{2} (3.42 sq mi)

Population (2004)
  - Total: 410
  - Density: 46.28/km^{2} (119.9/sq mi)
- Time zone: UTC+1 (CET)
  - Summer (DST): UTC+2 (CEST)
- Postal code: 9684
- Area code: 94

Egervölgy is a village in Vas County, Hungary.
