= Tanakajd =

- Location of Vas county in Hungary

- Location of Tanakajd
- Coordinates: 47.18690°N 16.74224°E
- Country: Hungary
- County: Vas

Area
  - Total: 11.82 km^{2} (4.56 sq mi)

Population (2004)
  - Total: 758
  - Density: 64.12/km^{2} (166.1/sq mi)
- Time zone: UTC+1 (CET)
  - Summer (DST): UTC+2 (CEST)
- Postal code: 9762
- Area code: 94

Tanakajd is a village in Vas county, Hungary.

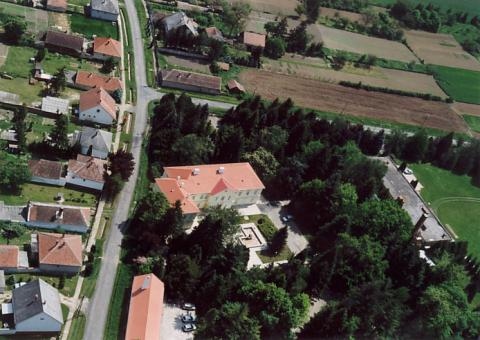
Aerial photography of Tanakajd
