= Pinkamindszent =

- Flag Coat of arms

- Location of Vas county in Hungary

- Location of Pinkamindszent
- Coordinates: 47.03865°N 16.4848°E
- Country: Hungary
- County: Vas

Area
  - Total: 11.01 km^{2} (4.25 sq mi)

Population (2004)
  - Total: 148
  - Density: 13.44/km^{2} (34.8/sq mi)
- Time zone: UTC+1 (CET)
  - Summer (DST): UTC+2 (CEST)
- Postal code: 9922
- Area code: 94

Pinkamindszent is a village in Vas county's Körmendi district in Hungary, near River Pinka.
