= Szemenye =

- Location of Vas county in Hungary

- Location of Szemenye
- Coordinates: 47.10173°N 16.90656°E
- Country: Hungary
- County: Vas

Area
  - Total: 11.8 km^{2} (4.6 sq mi)

Population (2004)
  - Total: 365
  - Density: 30.93/km^{2} (80.1/sq mi)
- Time zone: UTC+1 (CET)
  - Summer (DST): UTC+2 (CEST)
- Postal code: 9685
- Area code: 94

Szemenye is a village in Vas county, Hungary.
