= Püspökmolnári =

- Village
- Flag Coat of arms

- Location of Püspökmolnári
- Coordinates: 47.08636°N 16.79520°E
- Country: Hungary
- Region: Western Transdanubia
- County: Vas
- District: Vasvár

Area
  - Total: 15.1 km^{2} (5.8 sq mi)

Population (1 January 2025)
  - Total: 859
  - Density: 56.9/km^{2} (147/sq mi)
- Time zone: UTC+1 (CET)
  - Summer (DST): UTC+2 (CEST)
- Postal code: 9776
- Area code: (+36) 94
- Website: www.puspokmolnari.hu

Püspökmolnári is a village in Vas county, Hungary.
