= Hegyháthodász =

Hegyháthodász Hodis (in German)
- Village
- Flag Coat of arms

- Location of Hegyháthodász
- Coordinates: 46.93359°N 16.65720°E
- Country: Hungary
- Region: Western Transdanubia
- County: Vas
- District: Körmend

Area
  - Total: 8.08 km^{2} (3.12 sq mi)

Population (1 January 2025)
  - Total: 152
  - Density: 18.8/km^{2} (48.7/sq mi)
- Time zone: UTC+1 (CET)
  - Summer (DST): UTC+2 (CEST)
- Postal code: 9915
- Area code: (+36) 94
- Website: www.hegyhathodasz.hu

Hegyháthodász is a village in Vas county, Hungary.
