= Kondorfa =

- Location of Vas County in Hungary

- Location of Kondorfa
- Coordinates: 46.89509°N 16.39729°E
- Country: Hungary
- County: Vas

Area
  - Total: 21.61 km^{2} (8.34 sq mi)

Population (2004)
  - Total: 618
  - Density: 28.59/km^{2} (74.0/sq mi)
- Time zone: UTC+1 (CET)
  - Summer (DST): UTC+2 (CEST)
- Postal code: 9943
- Area code: 94

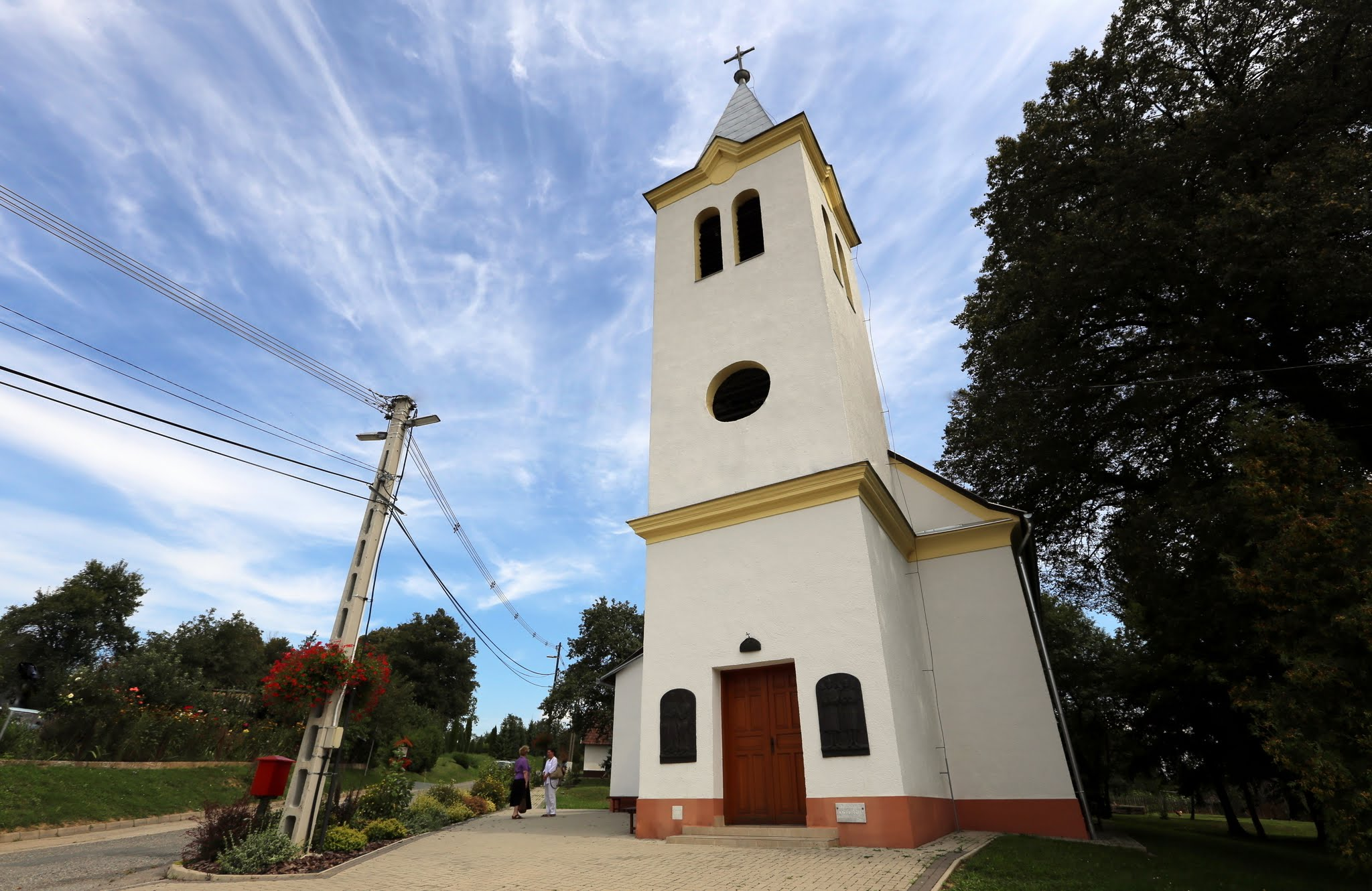
Saint Luke Church in Kondorfa

Kondorfa (Slovene: Kradanovci, German: Kradendorf) is a village in the Szentgotthárd District of Vas County, Hungary. A volunteer fire department has been operating in the village since at least 1893. The village's school was built in 1826, which has been turned into a museum with an interactive room for those hard of hearing.
