= Magyarnádalja =

- Village
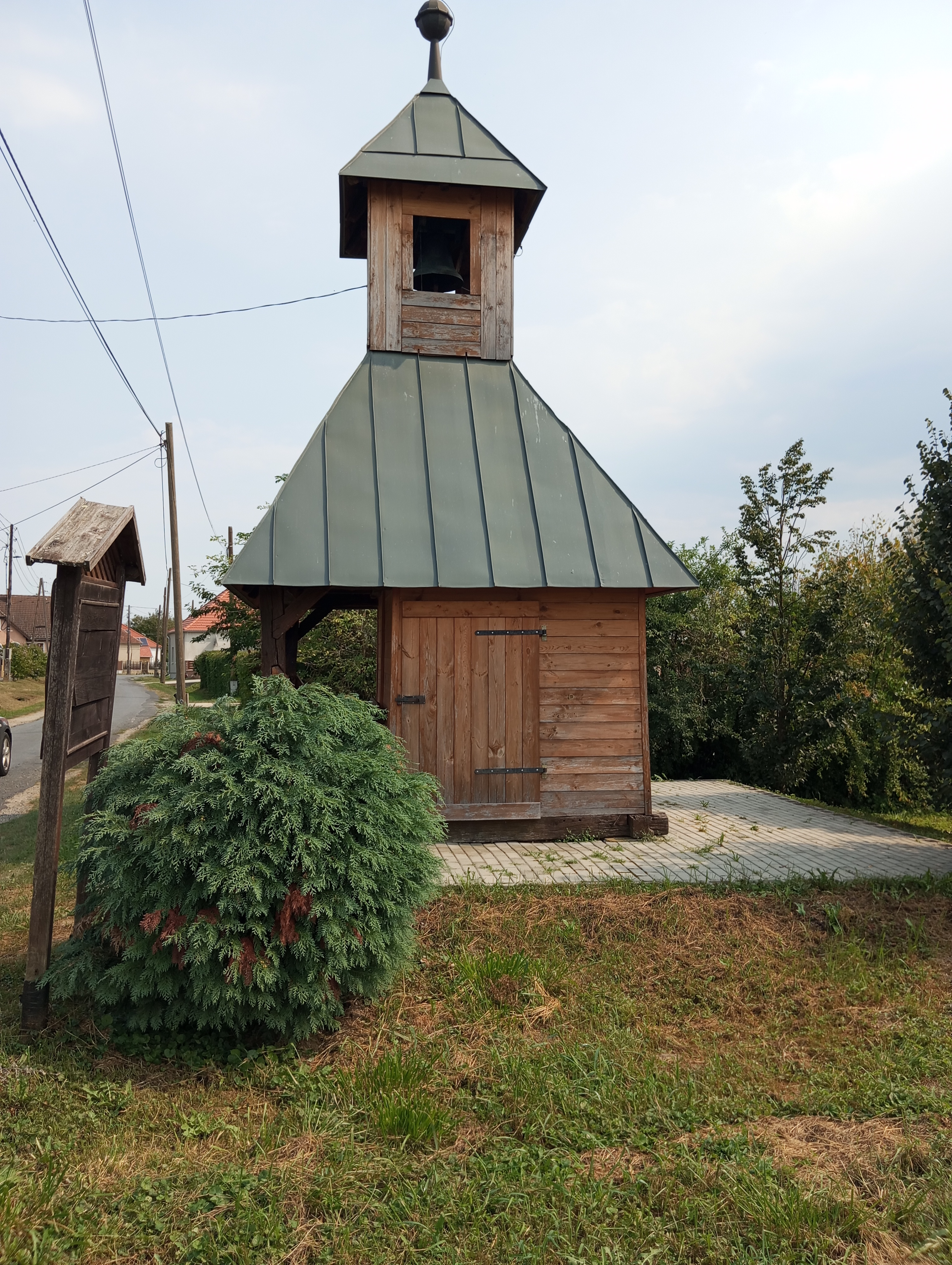
- The bell tower of Magyarnádalja.

- Flag Coat of arms

- Location of Magyarnádalja.
- Coordinates: 47°00′N 16°32′E
- Country: Hungary
- County: Vas
- District: Körmend District

Government
  - Mayor: Balogh Ádám (Ind.)

Area
  - Total: 3.85 km^{2} (1.49 sq mi)

Population (2022)
  - Total: 265
  - Density: 68.8/km^{2} (178/sq mi)
- Time zone: UTC+1 (CET)
  - Summer (DST): UTC+2 (CEST)
- Postal code: 9909
- Area code: 94
- Website: magyarnadalja.hu

Magyarnádalja is a village in Vas County's Körmend district, in Hungary.
