= Ispánk =

- Village
- Flag Coat of arms

- Location of Ispánk
- Coordinates: 46.86341°N 16.44252°E
- Country: Hungary
- Region: Western Transdanubia
- County: Vas
- District: Körmend

Area
  - Total: 6.92 km^{2} (2.67 sq mi)

Population (1 January 2026)
  - Total: 94
  - Density: 14/km^{2} (35/sq mi)
- Time zone: UTC+1 (CET)
  - Summer (DST): UTC+2 (CEST)
- Postal code: 9941
- Area code: (+36) 94
- Website: ispank.hu

Ispánk is a village in Vas county, Hungary.
