= Magyarlak =

- Location of Vas county in Hungary

- Location of Magyarlak
- Coordinates: 46.95076°N 16.34379°E
- Country: Hungary
- County: Vas

Area
  - Total: 7.62 km^{2} (2.94 sq mi)

Population (2004)
  - Total: 748
  - Density: 98.16/km^{2} (254.2/sq mi)
- Time zone: UTC+1 (CET)
  - Summer (DST): UTC+2 (CEST)
- Postal code: 9962
- Area code: 94

Magyarlak (German: Ungarisch-Minihof, Slovene: Lak) is a village in Vas county, Hungary.
