= Kerkáskápolna =

- Location of Kerkáskápolna in Hungary
- Coordinates: 46.78590°N 16.42483°E
- Country: Hungary
- Region: Western Transdanubia
- County: Vas
- Subregion: Őriszentpéteri
- Rank: Village

Area
  - Total: 9.20 km^{2} (3.55 sq mi)

Population (1 January 2008)
  - Total: 105
  - Density: 11.4/km^{2} (29.6/sq mi)
- Time zone: UTC+1 (CET)
  - Summer (DST): UTC+2 (CEST)
- Postal code: 9944
- Area code: +36 94
- KSH code: 19761
- Website: https://kerkaskapolna.hu/

Kerkáskápolna is a village in Vas county, Hungary.
