= Hegyhátszentmárton =

- Location of Vas county in Hungary

- Location of Hegyhátszentmárton
- Coordinates: 46.93535°N 16.47870°E
- Country: Hungary
- County: Vas

Area
  - Total: 12.74 km^{2} (4.92 sq mi)

Population (2004)
  - Total: 73
  - Density: 5.72/km^{2} (14.8/sq mi)
- Time zone: UTC+1 (CET)
  - Summer (DST): UTC+2 (CEST)
- Postal code: 9931
- Area code: 94

Hegyhátszentmárton is a village in Vas county, Hungary.
