= Rádóckölked =

- Coat of arms

- Location of Rádóckölked in Hungary
- Coordinates: 47°04′35″N 16°35′17″E
- Country: Hungary
- Region: Western Transdanubia
- County: Vas
- Subregion: Körmendi
- Rank: Village

Area
  - Total: 18.95 km^{2} (7.32 sq mi)

Population (1 January 2008)
  - Total: 263
  - Density: 13.9/km^{2} (35.9/sq mi)
- Time zone: UTC+1 (CET)
  - Summer (DST): UTC+2 (CEST)
- Postal code: 9784
- Area code: +36 94
- KSH code: 07551
- Website: www.radockolked.hu

Rádóckölked is a village in Vas county, Hungary.
