= Katafa =

- Location of Vas county in Hungary

- Location of Katafa
- Coordinates: 46.97975°N 16.63194°E
- Country: Hungary
- County: Vas

Area
  - Total: 4.81 km^{2} (1.86 sq mi)

Population (2004)
  - Total: 398
  - Density: 82.74/km^{2} (214.3/sq mi)
- Time zone: UTC+1 (CET)
  - Summer (DST): UTC+2 (CEST)
- Postal code: 9915
- Area code: 94

Disambiguation: Katafa is the name of the heroine of the novel The Garden of God.

Katafa is a village in Vas county, Hungary.
