= Hegyhátszentjakab =

Coordinates: 46°52′N 16°33′E

- Location of Vas county in Hungary
- Country: Hungary
- County: Vas

Area
  - Total: 9.47 km^{2} (3.66 sq mi)

Population (2005)
  - Total: 300
  - Density: 31.04/km^{2} (80.4/sq mi)
- Time zone: UTC+1 (CET)
  - Summer (DST): UTC+2 (CEST)
- Postal code: 9934
- Area code: 94

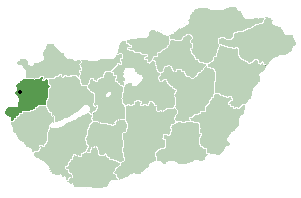
Location of Vas County in Hungary

Hegyhátszentjakab is a village in Vas County, in the west region of Hungary.

It is an ancient area with Roman-era tombs and monuments. The Hungarians settled here during the time of Saint Stephen. The first documented mention of the settlement on the edge of Őrség dates back to 1310, and it was named after the patron saint of its church, Saint James the Apostle. The church was built in the 13th century and was bought by the Esterházy family in 1738.

During the 20th century, the village suffered losses during both World Wars. Today, it is known for its Vadása Lake, and about one-third of its population is Lutheran.

== Geography ==
It covers an area of 832.22ha and has a population of 300 people (2005).
