= Halogy =

- Flag Coat of arms

- Location of Vas county in Hungary

- Location of Halogy
- Coordinates: 46.97122°N 16.56074°E
- Country: Hungary
- County: Vas

Area
  - Total: 7.05 km^{2} (2.72 sq mi)

Population (2009)
  - Total: 264
  - Density: 37.45/km^{2} (97.0/sq mi)
- Time zone: UTC+1 (CET)
  - Summer (DST): UTC+2 (CEST)
- Postal code: 9917
- Area code: 94

Halogy is a village in Vas county, Hungary. Its Neo-Gothic church was built in 1896.

Apart from the Church, the main civic buildings consist of the Village Hall, one pub and a small co-operative shop.
