= Nagymizdó =

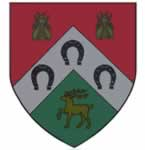
- Coat of arms

- Location of Nagymizdó in Hungary
- Coordinates: 46.99150°N 16.65488°E
- Country: Hungary
- Region: Western Transdanubia
- County: Vas
- Subregion: Körmendi
- Rank: Village

Area
  - Total: 6.76 km^{2} (2.61 sq mi)

Population (1 January 2008)
  - Total: 126
  - Density: 18.6/km^{2} (48.3/sq mi)
- Time zone: UTC+1 (CET)
  - Summer (DST): UTC+2 (CEST)
- Postal code: 9913
- Area code: +36 94
- KSH code: 15060
- Website: https://nagymizdo.asp.lgov.hu

Nagymizdó is a village in Vas county, Hungary. Is a municipality of 126 inhabitants (2008 data). It is located in the province of Vas.
