= Vasalja =

- Location of Vas county in Hungary

- Location of Vasalja
- Coordinates: 47.01250°N 16.51764°E
- Country: Hungary
- County: Vas

Area
  - Total: 11.24 km^{2} (4.34 sq mi)

Population (2004)
  - Total: 338
  - Density: 30.07/km^{2} (77.9/sq mi)
- Time zone: UTC+1 (CET)
  - Summer (DST): UTC+2 (CEST)
- Postal code: 9921
- Area code: 94

Vasalja is a village in Vas county, Hungary.

== Sightseeings ==
The old church has origin from the Árpád age. It has romanesque style, the southern doorway is decorated by a triangular outstanding roof. In the tympanon the lamb and the cross can be seen carved in traditional form.
