= Pankasz =

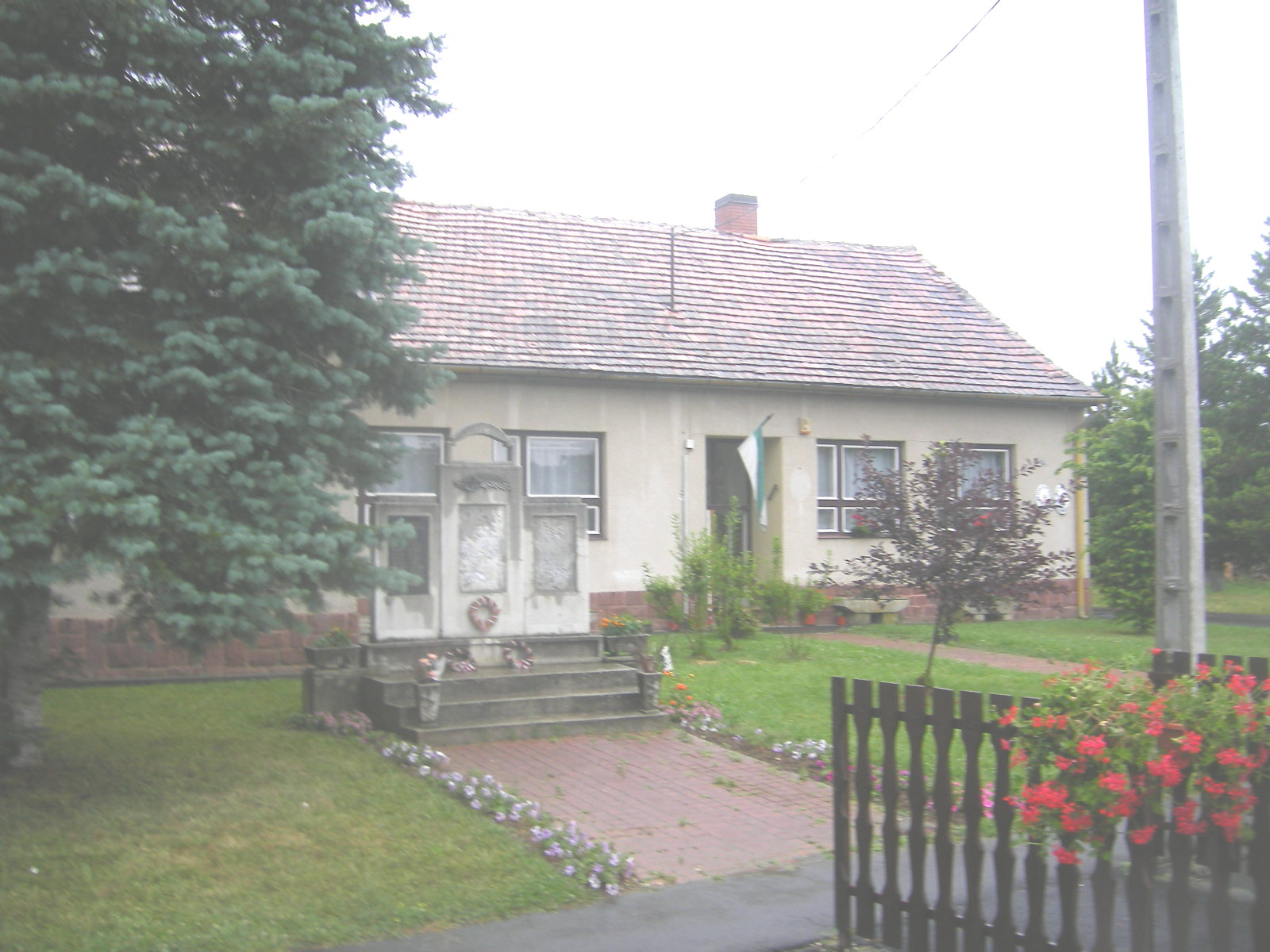
- Village hall

- Location of Vas county in Hungary

- Location of Pankasz
- Coordinates: 46.84087°N 16.50024°E
- Country: Hungary
- County: Vas

Area
  - Total: 9.27 km^{2} (3.58 sq mi)

Population (2004)
  - Total: 476
  - Density: 51.34/km^{2} (133.0/sq mi)
- Time zone: UTC+1 (CET)
  - Summer (DST): UTC+2 (CEST)
- Postal code: 9937
- Area code: 94

Pankasz is a village in Vas county, Hungary.
