= Egyházashollós =

- Village
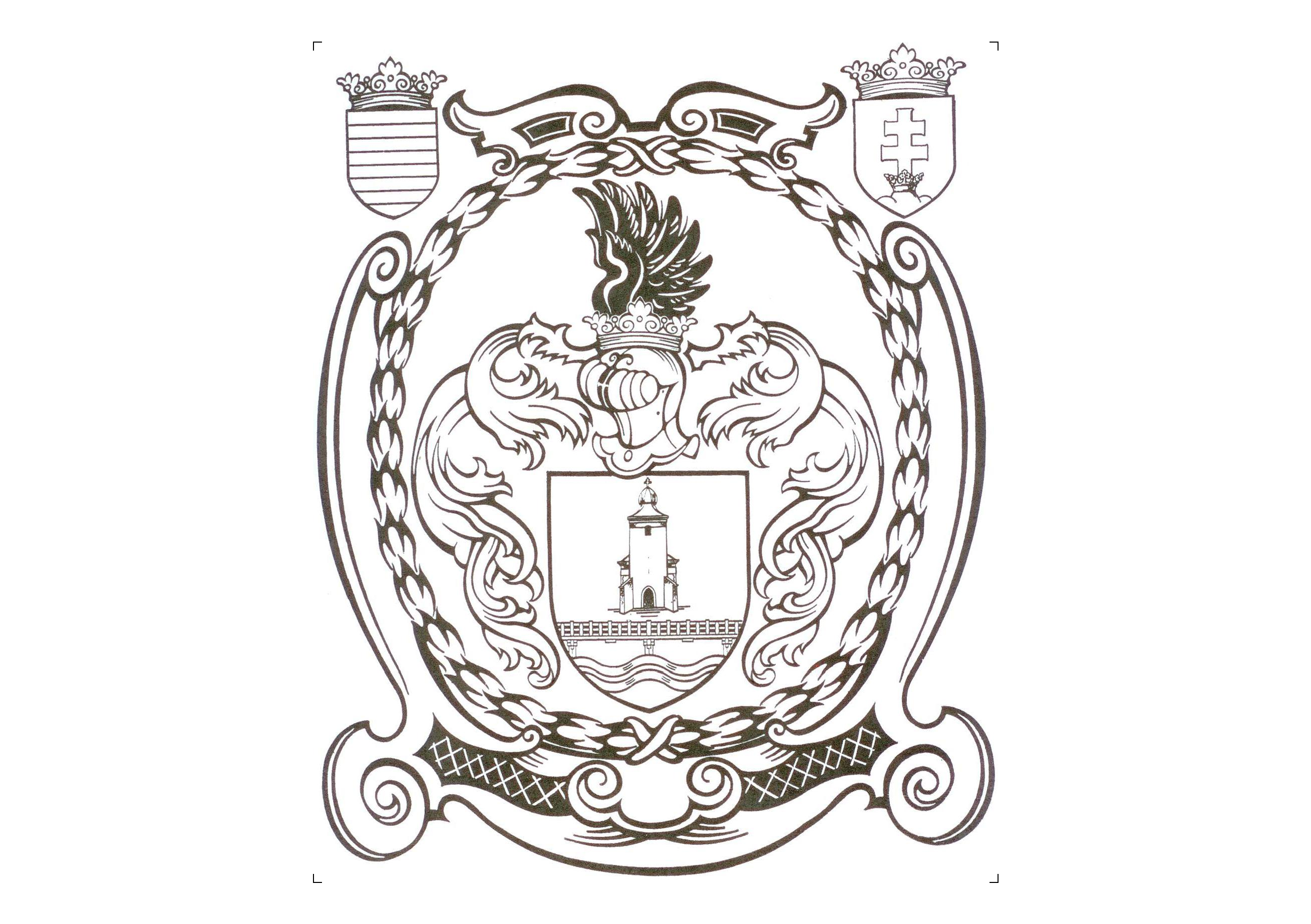
- Coat of arms

- Location of Vas county in Hungary

- Location of Egyházashollós
- Coordinates: 47.05303°N 16.69220°E
- Country: Hungary
- County: Vas

Area
  - Total: 19.04 km^{2} (7.35 sq mi)

Population (2024)
  - Total: 519
  - Density: 28.89/km^{2} (74.8/sq mi)
- Time zone: UTC+1 (CET)
  - Summer (DST): UTC+2 (CEST)
- Postal code: 9781
- Area code: 94

Egyházashollós is a village in Vas County, Hungary.
