= Viszák =

- Location of Viszák in Hungary
- Coordinates: 46°52′55.38″N 16°29′30.19″E
- Country: Hungary
- Region: Western Transdanubia
- County: Vas
- Subregion: Őriszentpéteri
- Rank: Village

Area
  - Total: 10.13 km^{2} (3.91 sq mi)

Population (1 January 2008)
  - Total: 256
  - Density: 25.3/km^{2} (65.5/sq mi)
- Time zone: UTC+1 (CET)
  - Summer (DST): UTC+2 (CEST)
- Postal code: 9932
- Area code: +36 94
- KSH code: 07940
- Website: www.viszak.hu

Viszák is a village in Vas county, Hungary.
