= Kemestaródfa =

- Coat of arms

- Location of Kemestaródfa in Hungary
- Coordinates: 46°59′50″N 16°31′03″E
- Country: Hungary
- Region: Western Transdanubia
- County: Vas
- Subregion: Körmendi
- Rank: Village

Area
  - Total: 6.35 km^{2} (2.45 sq mi)

Population (1 January 2008)
  - Total: 244
  - Density: 38.4/km^{2} (99.5/sq mi)
- Time zone: UTC+1 (CET)
  - Summer (DST): UTC+2 (CEST)
- Postal code: 9923
- Area code: +36 94
- KSH code: 22716
- Website: www.kemestarodfa.com

Kemestaródfa is a village in Vas county, Hungary. It is located near the western border of the country.
