= Harasztifalu =

- Location of Vas county in Hungary

- Location of Harasztifalu
- Coordinates: 47.05083°N 16.55279°E
- Country: Hungary
- County: Vas

Area
  - Total: 7.89 km^{2} (3.05 sq mi)

Population (2004)
  - Total: 186
  - Density: 23.57/km^{2} (61.0/sq mi)
- Time zone: UTC+1 (CET)
  - Summer (DST): UTC+2 (CEST)
- Postal code: 9784
- Area code: 94

Harasztifalu (Croatian: Hrastovica, German: Harastin) is a village in Vas county, Hungary. Its current mayor is Vámosné Marksz Mária.
