= Daraboshegy =

- Flag Coat of arms

- Location of Vas county in Hungary

- Location of Daraboshegy
- Coordinates: 46.95951°N 16.56914°E
- Country: Hungary
- County: Vas

Area
  - Total: 4.59 km^{2} (1.77 sq mi)

Population (2004)
  - Total: 100
  - Density: 21.78/km^{2} (56.4/sq mi)
- Time zone: UTC+1 (CET)
  - Summer (DST): UTC+2 (CEST)
- Postal code: 9917
- Area code: 94

Daraboshegy is a village in Vas County, Hungary. The name originates from the Darabos lineage of the ancient family of the Nádasdys, who owned this land during the early Middle Ages. Daraboshegy is one of the smallest hamlets in the country and has an estimated population of 95 in 2011. There has been a recorded settlement on this site since the 13th century.
