= Szaknyér =

- Location of Szaknyér in Hungary
- Coordinates: 46.86424°N 16.52743°E
- Country: Hungary
- Region: Western Transdanubia
- County: Vas
- Subregion: Őriszentpéteri
- Rank: Village

Area
  - Total: 2.93 km^{2} (1.13 sq mi)

Population (1 January 2008)
  - Total: 66
  - Density: 23/km^{2} (58/sq mi)
- Time zone: UTC+1 (CET)
  - Summer (DST): UTC+2 (CEST)
- Postal code: 9934
- Area code: +36 94
- KSH code: 16504

Szaknyér is a village in Vas county, Hungary.
