= Velemér =

- Coat of arms

- Location of Velemér in Hungary
- Coordinates: 46°44′15.83″N 16°22′40.08″E
- Country: Hungary
- Region: Western Transdanubia
- County: Vas
- Subregion: Őriszentpéteri
- Rank: Village

Area
  - Total: 9.55 km^{2} (3.69 sq mi)

Population (1 January 2008)
  - Total: 89
  - Density: 9.3/km^{2} (24/sq mi)
- Time zone: UTC+1 (CET)
  - Summer (DST): UTC+2 (CEST)
- Postal code: 9946
- Area code: +36 94
- KSH code: 18430
- Website: www.velemer.hu

Velemér (Slovene: Velemer) is a village in Vas county, Hungary.

== Parochial church ==
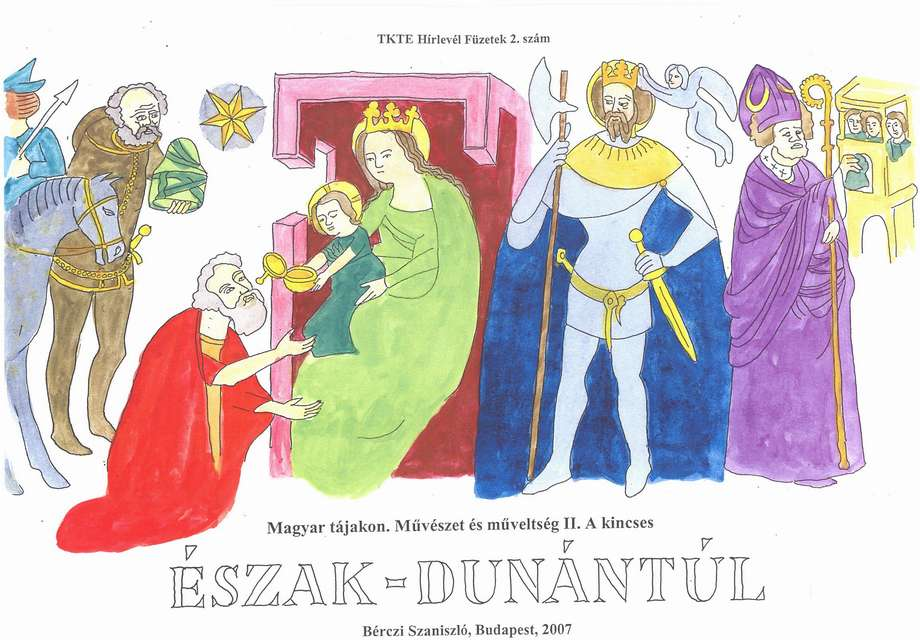
Old mural painting in the Velemér church: the artist was Johannes Aquila. Detail from the cover of the field work book about this landscape.

The parochial church is located in the forest at the end of the village. Its murals of late Árpád-age was painted by Aquila János. It was destroyed by fire in the late 19th century. Earlier it was measured and described by Rómer Flóris, member of the Hungarian Academy of Science. The artist also painted Nagytótlak rotunda in this region.

== Gallery ==
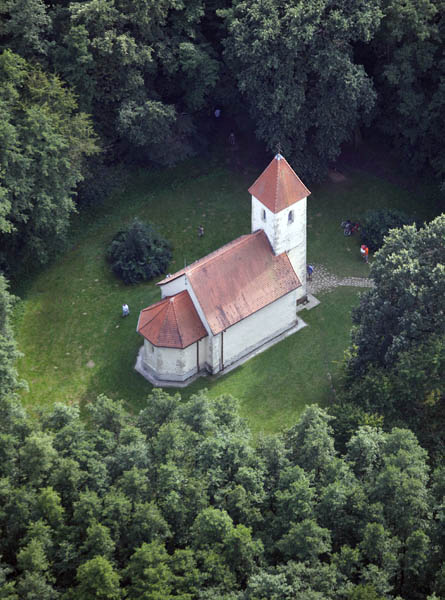

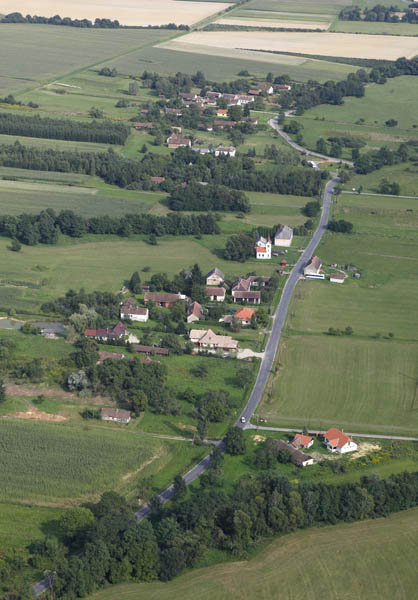

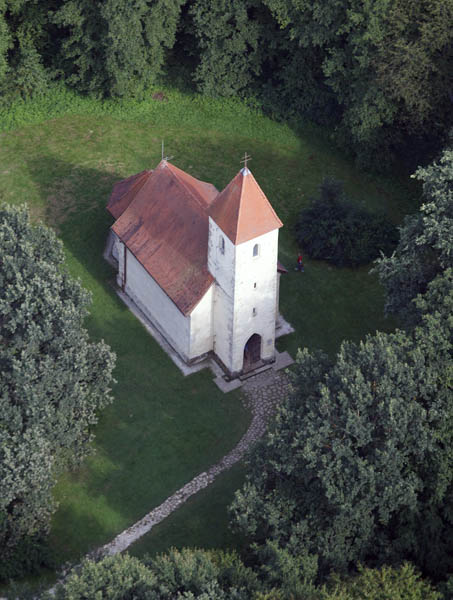

== Sources ==
- Genthon István: Magyarország műemlékei. I. Dunántúl. Budapest, 1959. 444 p.
- Gerevich Tibor: Magyarország románkori emlékei. (Die romanische Denkmäler Ungarns.) Egyetemi nyomda. Budapest, 1938. 843 p.
- Dercsényi Dezsõ: Árpád-kori műemlékeink Vas megyében. (Vas County Heritage from the Árpád age). Vasi Szemle 1959. 2. sz., 57–67. p.
- Magyarország, Panoráma, Budapest, 1980.
- Aerial photographs of Velemér
