= Felsőjánosfa =

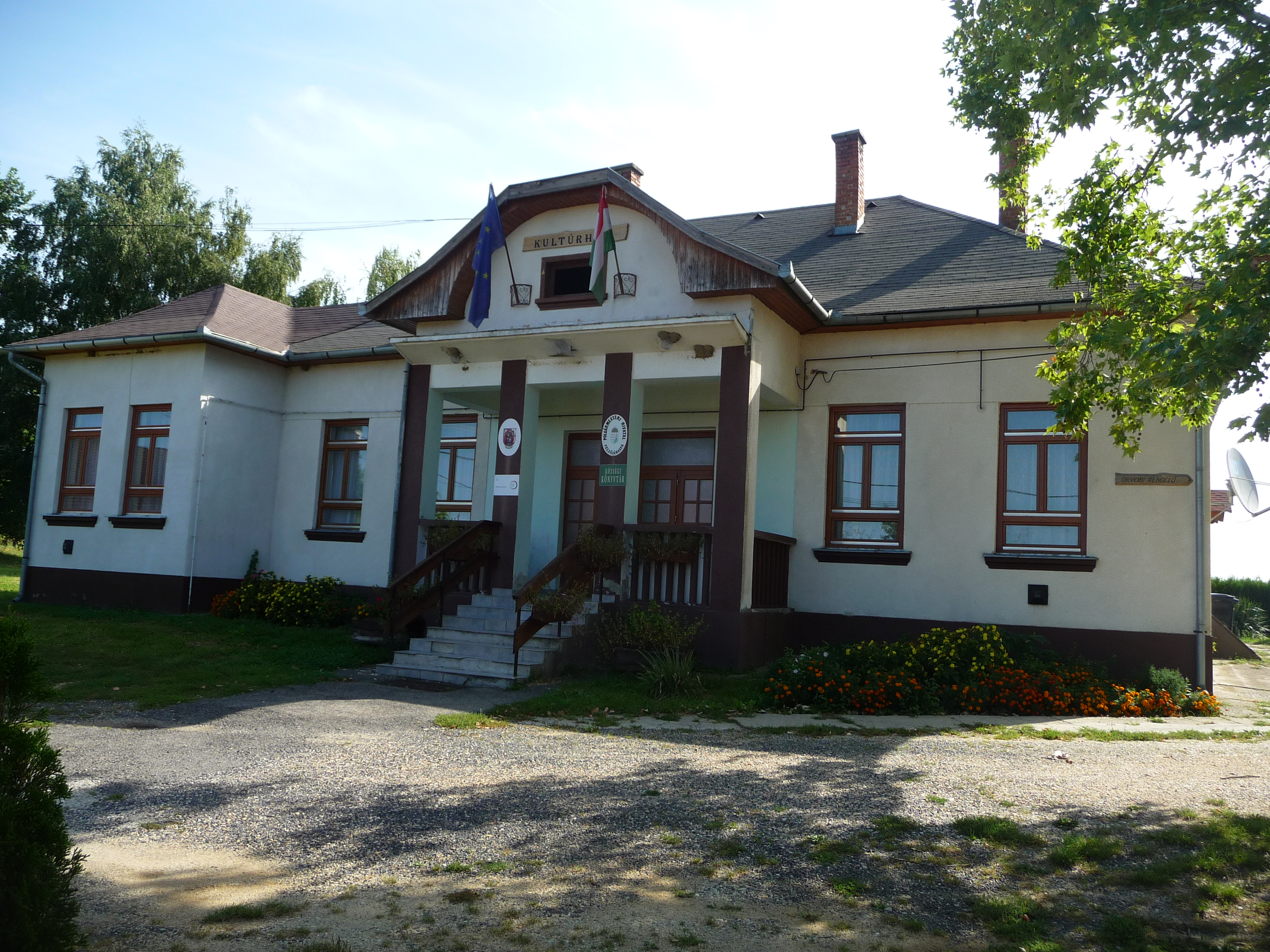
- Town hall

- Location of Vas county in Hungary

- Location of Felsőjánosfa
- Coordinates: 46.84628°N 16.55444°E
- Country: Hungary
- County: Vas

Area
  - Total: 3.06 km^{2} (1.18 sq mi)

Population (2004)
  - Total: 213
  - Density: 69.61/km^{2} (180.3/sq mi)
- Time zone: UTC+1 (CET)
  - Summer (DST): UTC+2 (CEST)
- Postal code: 9934
- Area code: 94

Felsőjánosfa is a village in Vas county, Hungary.
