= Nagyrákos =

- Location of Nagyrákos in Hungary
- Coordinates: 46.82836°N 16.45638°E
- Country: Hungary
- Region: Western Transdanubia
- County: Vas
- Subregion: Őriszentpéteri
- Rank: Village

Area
  - Total: 16.11 km^{2} (6.22 sq mi)

Population (1 January 2008)
  - Total: 277
  - Density: 17.2/km^{2} (44.5/sq mi)
- Time zone: UTC+1 (CET)
  - Summer (DST): UTC+2 (CEST)
- Postal code: 9938
- Area code: +36 94
- KSH code: 29869
- Website: http://www.nagyrakos.hu

Nagyrákos is a village in Vas county, Hungary. Notable attractions include a small chicken farm, a statue commemorating the Guinness World Record for largest pot of pörkölt, held in 1986, the Nagyrákosi völgyhíd bridge, and the Zsohár Kertészet flower emporium.
