= Kisrákos =

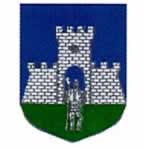
- Coat of arms

- Location of Kisrákos in Hungary
- Coordinates: 46.86130°N 16.50033°E
- Country: Hungary
- Region: Western Transdanubia
- County: Vas
- Subregion: Őriszentpéteri
- Rank: Village

Area
  - Total: 11.06 km^{2} (4.27 sq mi)

Population (1 January 2008)
  - Total: 217
  - Density: 19.6/km^{2} (50.8/sq mi)
- Time zone: UTC+1 (CET)
  - Summer (DST): UTC+2 (CEST)
- Postal code: 9936
- Area code: +36 94
- KSH code: 11147
- Website: www.kisrakos.hu

Kisrákos is a village in Vas county, Hungary.
