= Ivánc =

- Flag Coat of arms

- Location of Ivánc in Hungary
- Coordinates: 46.93542°N 16.49709°E
- Country: Hungary
- Region: Western Transdanubia
- County: Vas
- Subregion: Őriszentpéteri
- Rank: Village

Area
  - Total: 17.14 km^{2} (6.62 sq mi)

Population (1 January 2008)
  - Total: 702
  - Density: 41.0/km^{2} (106/sq mi)
- Time zone: UTC+1 (CET)
  - Summer (DST): UTC+2 (CEST)
- Postal code: 9931
- Area code: +36 94
- KSH code: 31680
- Website: www.ivanc.hu

Ivánc is a village in Vas County, Hungary.Ivánc has 800 year's of history
