= Vasvár District =

Vasvár District Vasvári járás
- Districts of Hungary
- Coat of arms

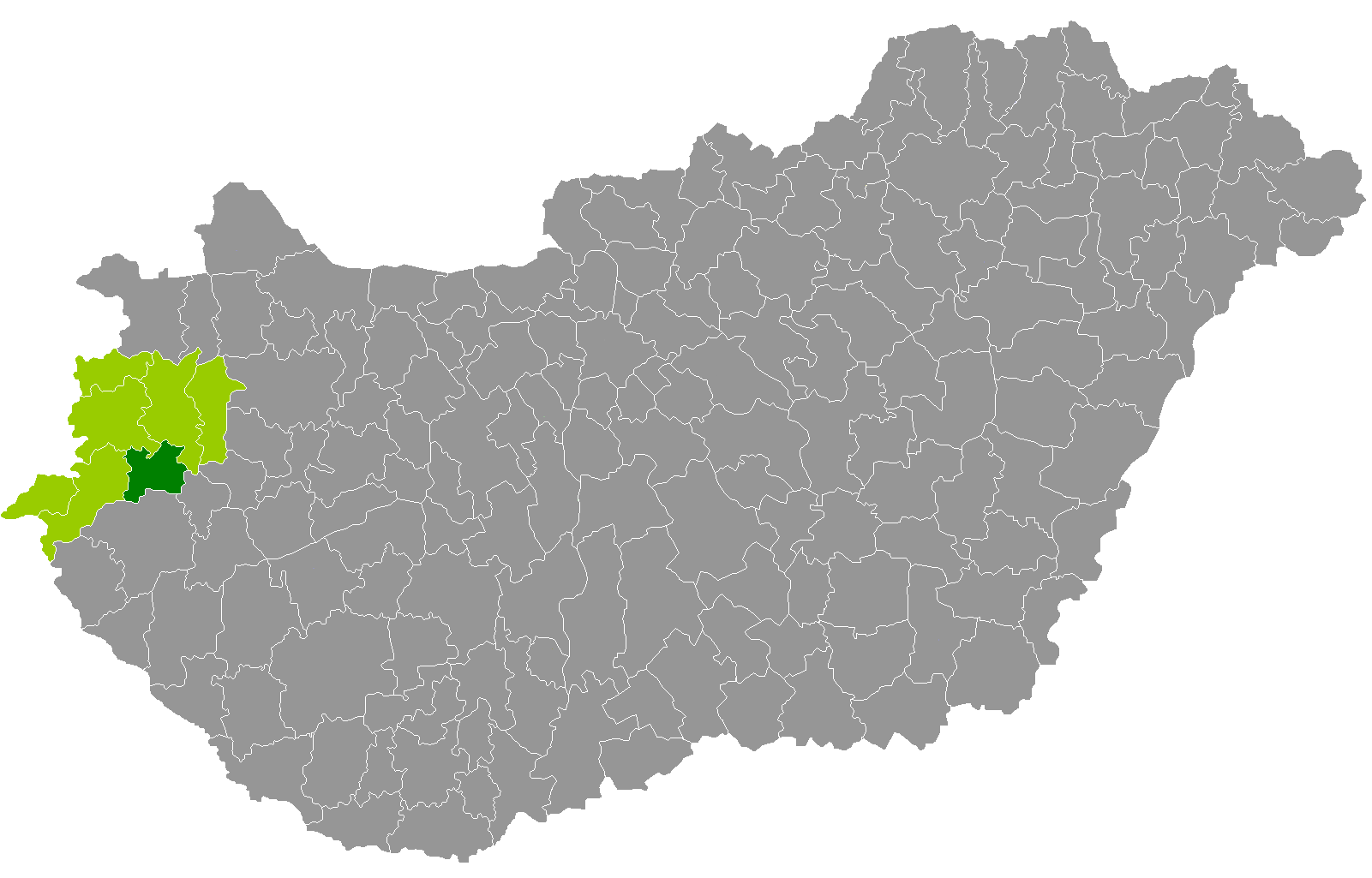
- Vasvár District within Hungary and Vas County.
- Coordinates: 47.05°N 16.80°E
- Country: Hungary
- County: Vas
- District seat: Vasvár

Area
  - Total: 374.14 km^{2} (144.46 sq mi)
  - Rank: 5th in Vas

Population (2011 census)
  - Total: 13,767
  - Rank: 7th in Vas
  - Density: 37/km^{2} (96/sq mi)

Vasvár (Hungarian: Vasvári járás) is a district in southern part of Vas County. Vasvár is also the name of the town where the district seat is found. The district is located in the Western Transdanubia Statistical Region.

== Geography ==
Vasvár District borders with Sárvár District to the northeast, Zalaszentgrót District (Zala County) to the southeast, Zalaegerszeg District (Zala County) to the south, Körmend District to the west, Szombathely District to the northwest. The number of the inhabited places in Vasvár District is 23.

== Municipalities ==
The district has 1 town and 22 villages. (ordered by population, as of 1 January 2013)

- Alsóújlak (599)
- Andrásfa (222)
- Bérbaltavár (558)
- Csehi (246)
- Csehimindszent (363)
- Csipkerek (342)
- Egervölgy (352)
- Gersekarát (648)
- Győrvár (594)
- Hegyhátszentpéter (105)
- Kám (398)
- Mikosszéplak (312)
- Nagytilaj (138)
- Olaszfa (383)
- Oszkó (637)
- Pácsony (285)
- Petőmihályfa (203)
- Püspökmolnári (878)
- Rábahídvég (1,024)
- Sárfimizdó (83)
- Szemenye (318)
- Telekes (523)
- **Vasvár** (4,387) – district seat

The bolded municipality is the city.

== Demographics ==
Religion in Vasvár District (2011 census)
1. Catholic Church (74.0%)
2. Greek Catholicism (0.10%)
3. Lutheranism (1.60%)
4. Calvinism (1.30%)
5. Other religions (0.80%)
6. Non-religious (2.70%)
7. Atheists (0.40%)
8. Undeclared (19.1%)

In 2011, it had a population of 13,767 and the population density was 37/km^{2}.

Year	County population	Change
2011	13,767	n/a

=== Ethnicity ===
Besides the Hungarian majority, the main minorities are the Roma (approx. 300) and German (200).

Total population (2011 census): 13,767
Ethnic groups (2011 census): Identified themselves: 12,709 persons:

- Hungarians: 12,141 (95.53%)
- Gypsies: 290 (2.28%)
- Germans: 175 (1.38%)
- Others and indefinable: 103 (0.81%)

Approx. 1,000 persons in Vasvár District did not declare their ethnic group at the 2011 census.

=== Religion ===
Religious adherence in the county according to 2011 census:

- Catholic – 10,208 (Roman Catholic – 10,184; Greek Catholic – 20);
- Evangelical – 223;
- Reformed – 184;
- other religions – 104;
- Non-religious – 368;
- Atheism – 52;
- Undeclared – 2,628.

== See also ==
- List of cities and towns in Hungary
