= Gersekarát =

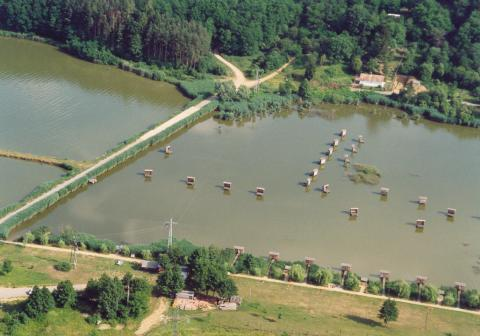
- an aerial view of Sárvíz Lake

- Location of Gersekarát
- Coordinates: 46°58′26″N 16°44′48″E
- Country: Hungary
- Region: Western Transdanubia
- County: Vas

Government
  - Mayor: Paszthory Istvanne

Area
  - Total: 19.92 km^{2} (7.69 sq mi)

Population (2025)
  - Total: 619
  - Households: 332
- Postal Code: 9813
- Area Code: 94
- Website: www.gersekarat.hu

Gersekarát is a village in Vas county, Hungary. In 2025 the population was 619 in 332 households.

== Location ==
Gersekarát lies 10 km (6 mi) west-southwest of Vasvár, 16 km (10 mi) east-southeast of Körmend, and just north of the Sárvíz Brook (Hungarian: Sárvíz-patak). Other nearby villages include Sárfimizdó (4 km (2.5 mi)), Telekes (4 km), Döbörhegy (4 km), Döröske (5 km (3 mi)), Petőmihályfa (5 km), Andrásfa (6 km (4 mi)) and Halastó (6 km).

== History ==
The history of Gersekarát is really the history of two villages, Gerse and Karátföld, which were separate communities until 1950 (see below). The first official mention of Gerse comes from 1272; Karátföld from 1313. Both villages were created by clear-cutting the ancient forest of the area. In the first decade of the 14th century, there was an armed struggle for power between rival noble factions, the so-called "Domination of Gerse" (Hungarian: gersei hatalmaskodás). During this struggle a member of the Pethő family was killed, and the village church was burnt down.

In 1448, the serfs of Gerse revolted against officials of the comitatus. In the course of putting down the uprising, the town was occupied by the comitatus, and only by the order of János Hunyadi was it returned to its earlier landlords, the Pethő family of Gerse.

During the Turkish occupation, Gerse was depopulated twice. It was re-founded by a Turkish spahi, Haszán Kara. Overall both Gerse and Karátföld endured many Turkish attacks.

In 1766, there was another serf uprising. It was suppressed, and some participants were brought before the royal courts. At the end of the 18th century, Gerse fell under the control of the Festetics family. Karátföld, being a noble village, was able to keep its remaining privileges until 1848.

Under the influence of the 1868 Education Act, community schools were established first in Karátföld, and soon after in Gerse. In 1906 the town gained a notary, and in 1907 a post office. During the decades surrounding the turn of the century, the towns lost much of their population due to emigration, World War I, and the ensuing Spanish flu pandemic and typhus.

In 1927, Gerse was connected to Hungary's telephone network. Gerse received a new school building in 1930; this was the so-called "multi-storied school," which today houses the town's notary and local government offices. The Minister of the Interior suggested joining Gerse and Karátföld in 1937, but the citizens rejected the proposal and the idea was dropped. In 1938, regular medical services became available.

The 1950s and 60s were decades of major changes for the two villages. The official joining of Gerse and Karátföld took place October 1, 1950; at this time the united town received the name Gersekarát. In 1951, the town began to be electrified. In 1952 the current school building was constructed. In 1953, the town council formalized the streets' names, which are still in use today. From 1957 the town received regular bus services, connecting it to other towns and villages. In 1963 the new Community Center (Hungarian: Művelődési Ház) was constructed. In 1964, the local water tower was inaugurated. In 1966 Gersekarát joined with Sárfimizdó to form one common town council, with Telekes joining also four years later. The kindergarten was built in 1969. In 2001, a 33-hectare fishing lake was created on the town's southern border by damming the Sárvíz Brook.

== Sights and attractions ==
One attraction of Gersekarát is Lake Fias (Hungarian: Fiastó), a small lake at the northern part of the village. Several species of protected plants can be found growing on the banks of the lake. At the southern end of the village lies the man-made 33.3 hectare lake. Part of the lake is reserved for fishing; the other part can be used for swimming, sunbathing, jet-skiing, and other water sports. Accommodation can be found either in campsites next to the lake or in rental houses and rooms in the village itself.

== Picture gallery ==
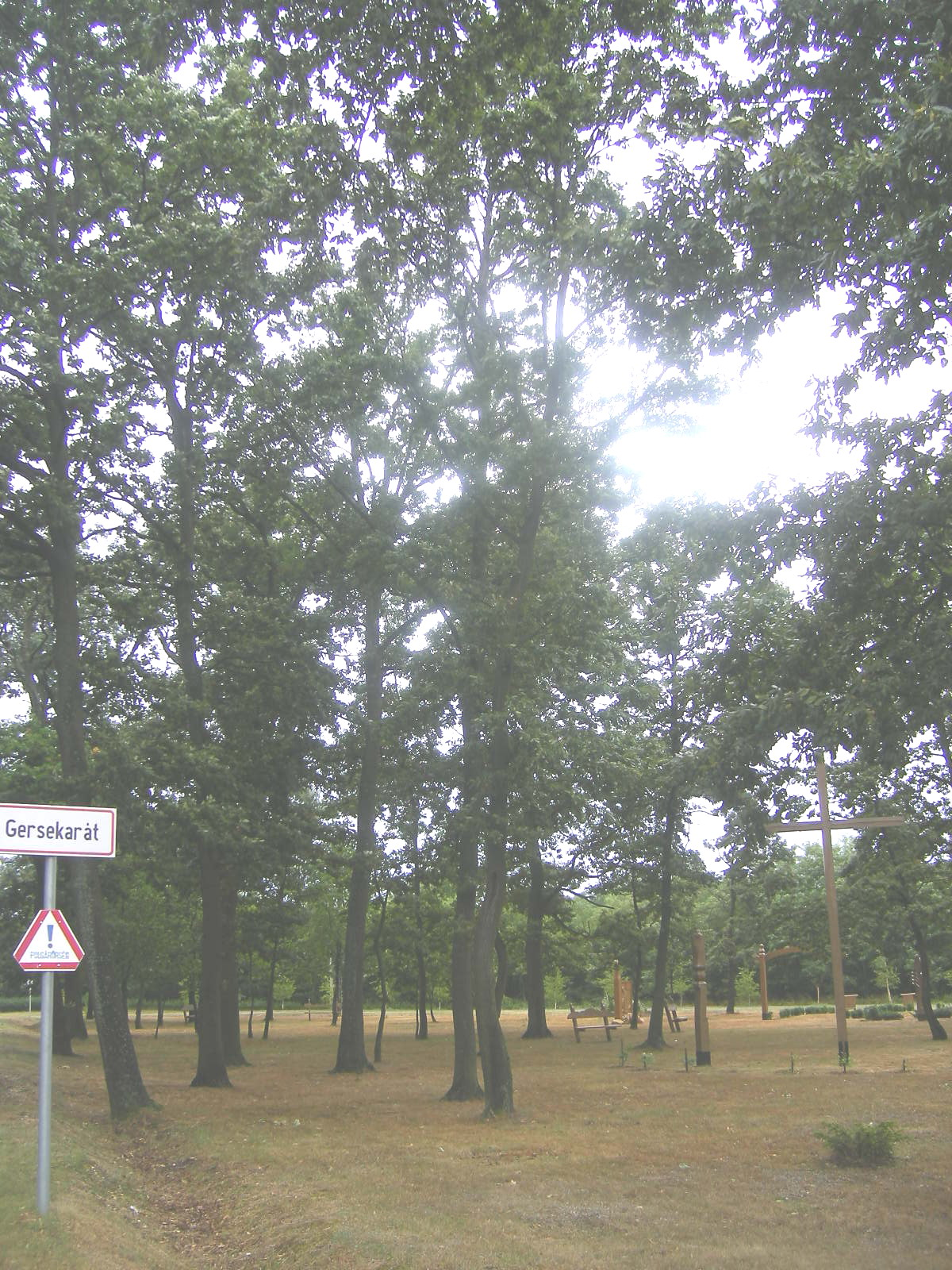
The small forest at the northern end of the town

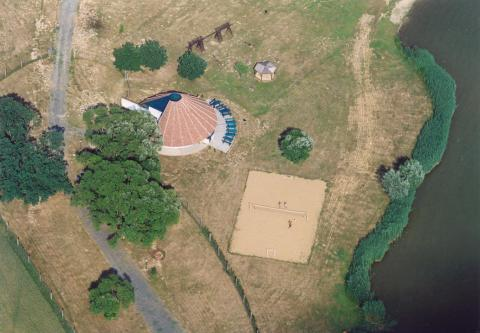
Some of the lakeside facilities

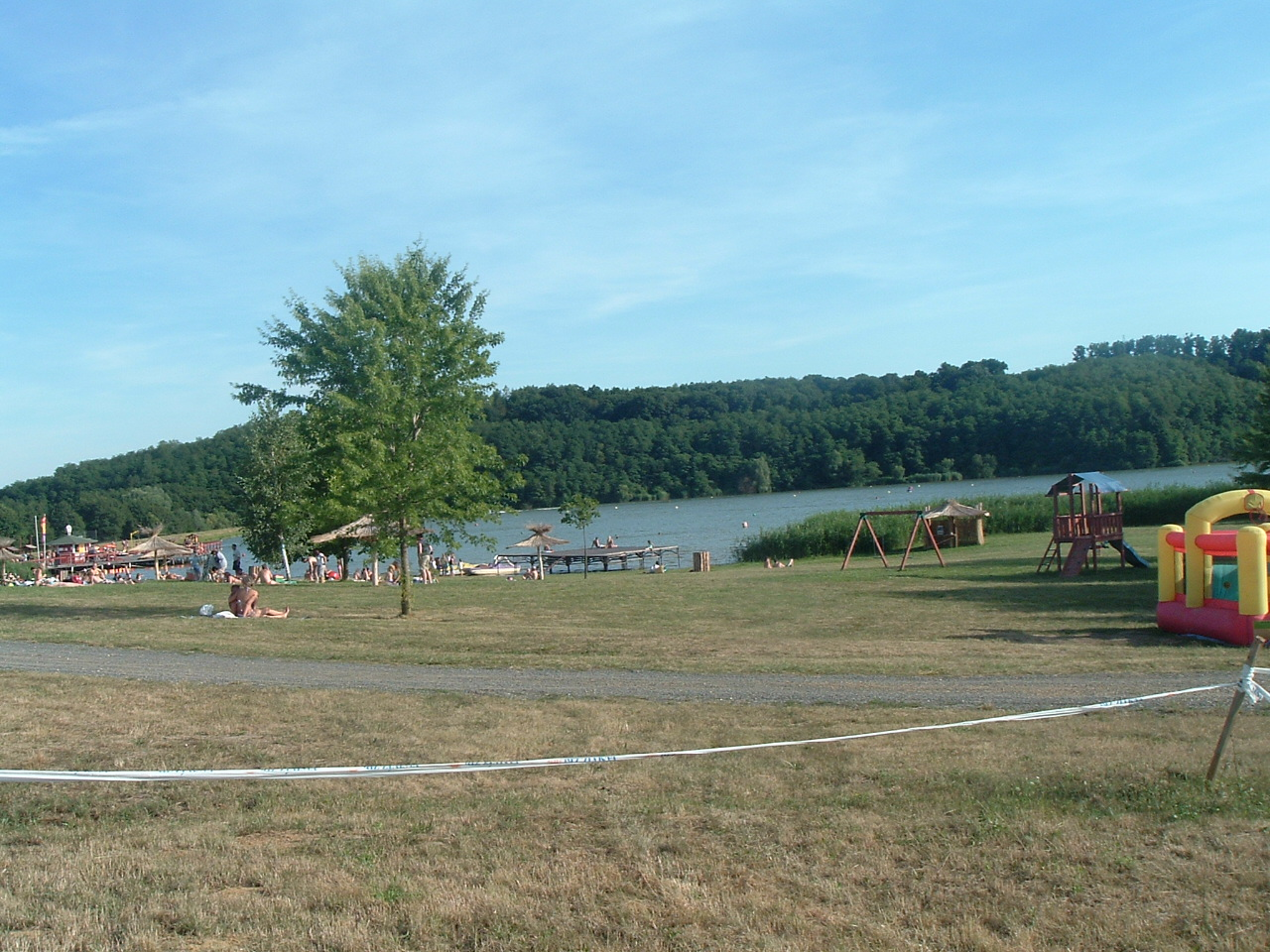
The beach at the east end of the lake

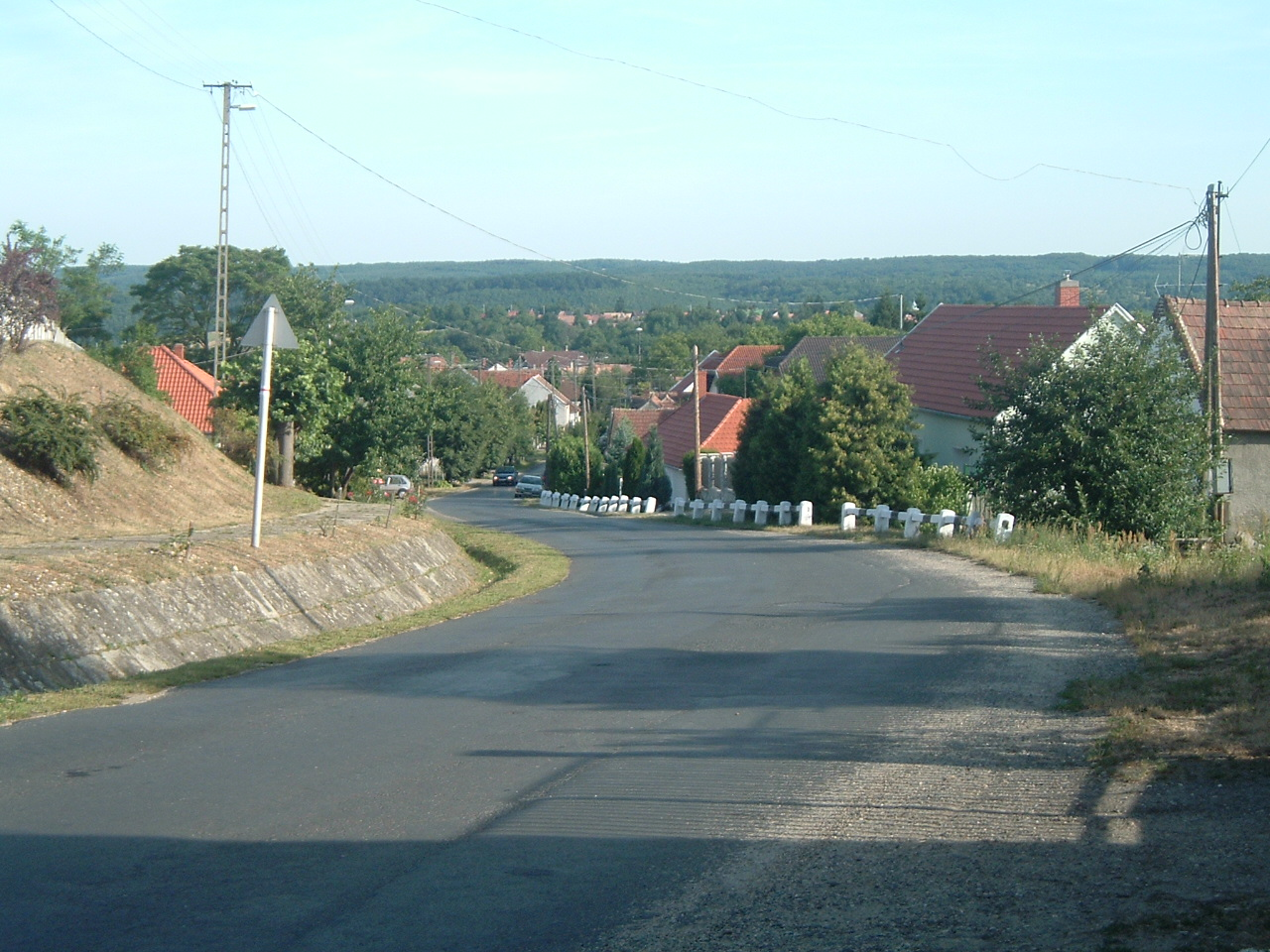
Looking into the village

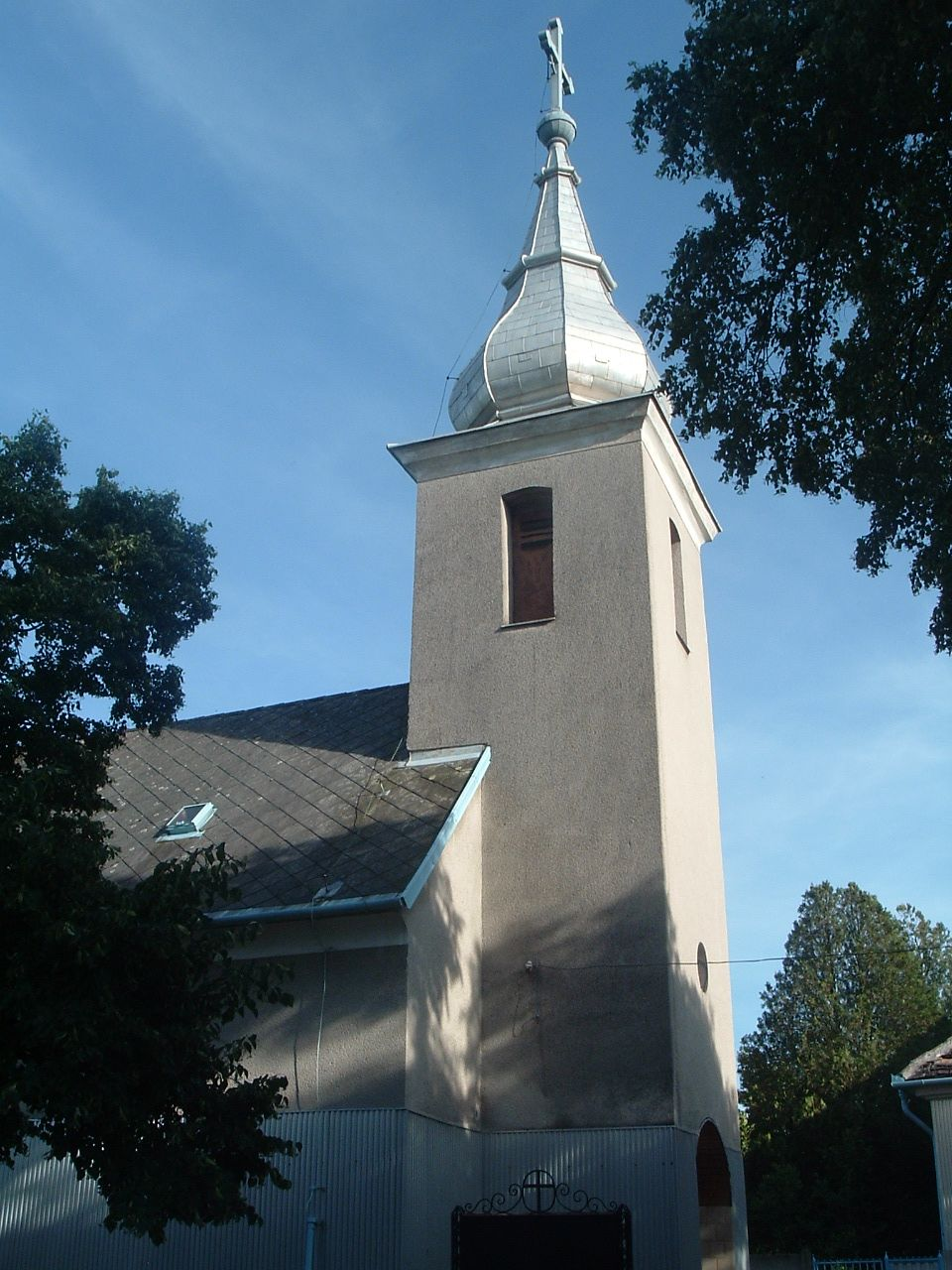
The tower of Gerse's Holy Cross Church (Roman Cath.)

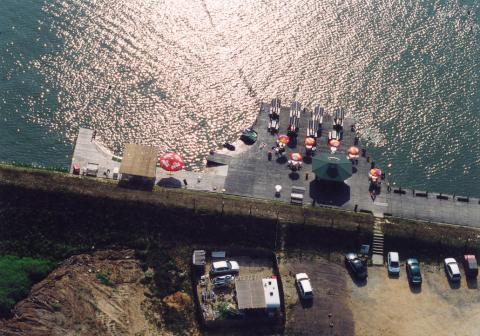
More lakeside facilities
