= Telekes =

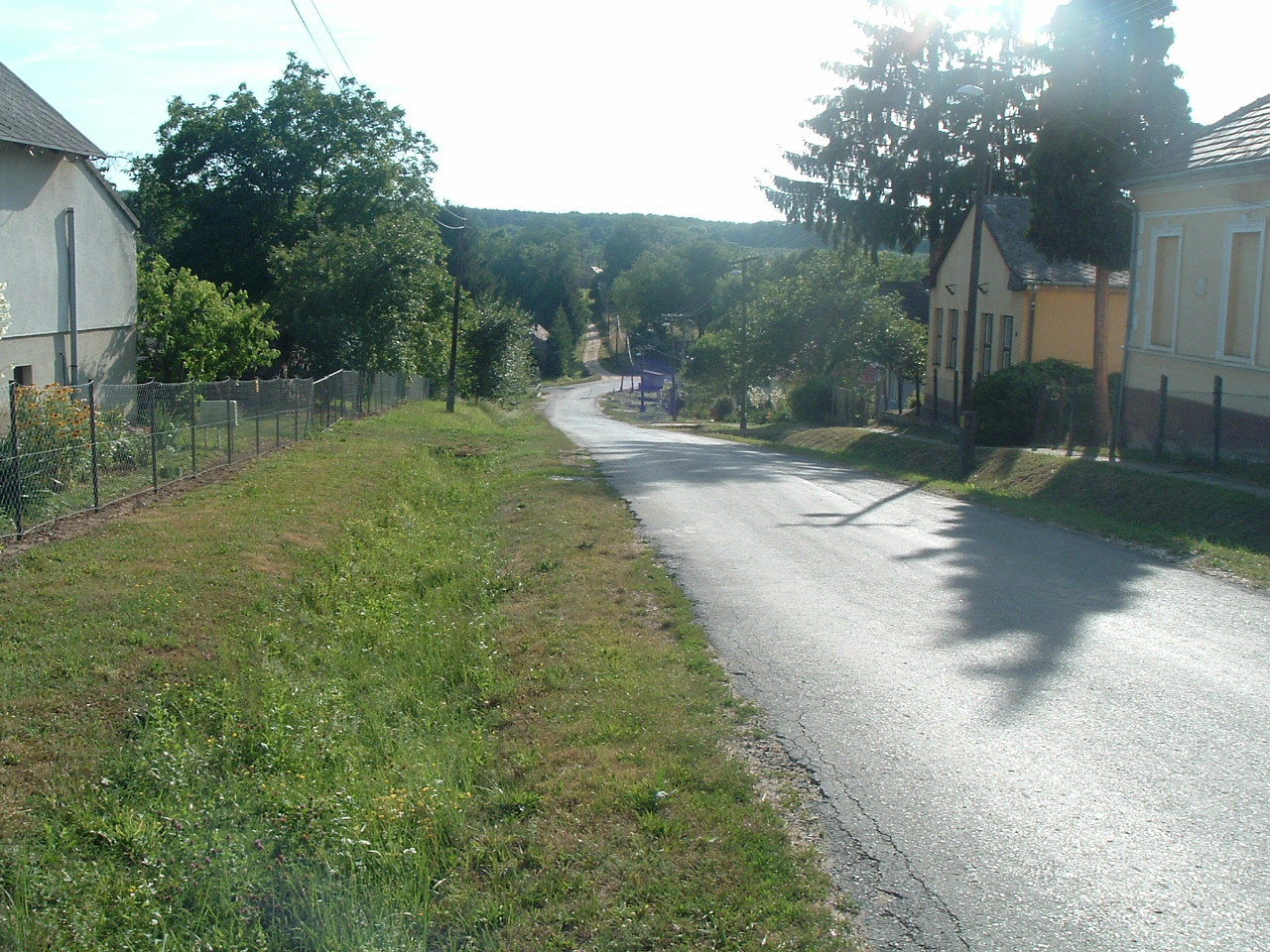
- Alsótelekes High Street

- Coat of arms

- Location of Telekes in Hungary
- Coordinates: 46.94268°N 16.76715°E
- Country: Hungary
- Region: Western Transdanubia
- County: Vas
- Subregion: Vasvár
- Diocese (RC): Vasvári
- Rank: Village

Government
  - Mayor: László József Orbán

Area
  - Total: 10.8 km^{2} (4.2 sq mi)

Population (1 January 2008)
  - Total: 533
  - Density: 49.4/km^{2} (128/sq mi)
- Time zone: UTC+1 (CET)
  - Summer (DST): UTC+2 (CEST)
- Postal code: 9812
- Area code: +36 94
- KSH code: 29568
- Website: http://www.telekes.hu/

Telekes is a village in Vas County, Hungary.

== Geography ==
Telekes sits alongside the Sárvíz stream, in the Vas hills.

There are two parts to the village: Alsótelekes (Lower Telekes) and Felsőtelekes (Upper Telekes), which were amalgamated at the beginning of the 20th century.

== History ==
The first written record of the village is in 1255 as Latin: Tekus. The name originated from the noun meaning "area of fertile soil". The name of the village varied during the centuries. In 1282 it is recorded as Thelekus, in 1293 as Telukus, in 1408 as Thelekes, in 1454 as Thelekws, and in 1475 as Thelekews.

The village was owned by the Telekes family (Szepetki, biki Basó, ollári Tompa).

According to András Vályi:

Telekes is a Hungarian village in the shire county of Vas. Its lords are gentlemen, the inhabitants are various. It is near Gerse, its meadows and woods abutting the border, but its arable land is poor and it has no vineyards on the hills.

According to Elek Fényes

Telekes is a Hungarian village in Vas county, near the River Zala, 384 Catholic and 8 Jewish inhabitants. Beautiful forest and many meadows.

The Vas County Records says:

Alsó-Telekes has 66 houses and 542 Hungarian Roman Catholic inhabitants. The post office is in Andrásfa, the telegraph is in Győrvár. It has two Catholic churches: one of them built around 1700, the other in 1800. The village’s lords were the Delecskey and Ebergényi families.

In 1910 there were 709 Hungarian inhabitants. The village was part of Vasvár, the shire county of Vas.

== Landmarks ==
There are two Roman Catholic churches: one built around 1700 and the other in 1800. The church in Alsótelekes is the Church of the Holy Trinity, the other in Felsőtelkes is the Church of Our Lady.

== Gallery ==
Images of Telekes

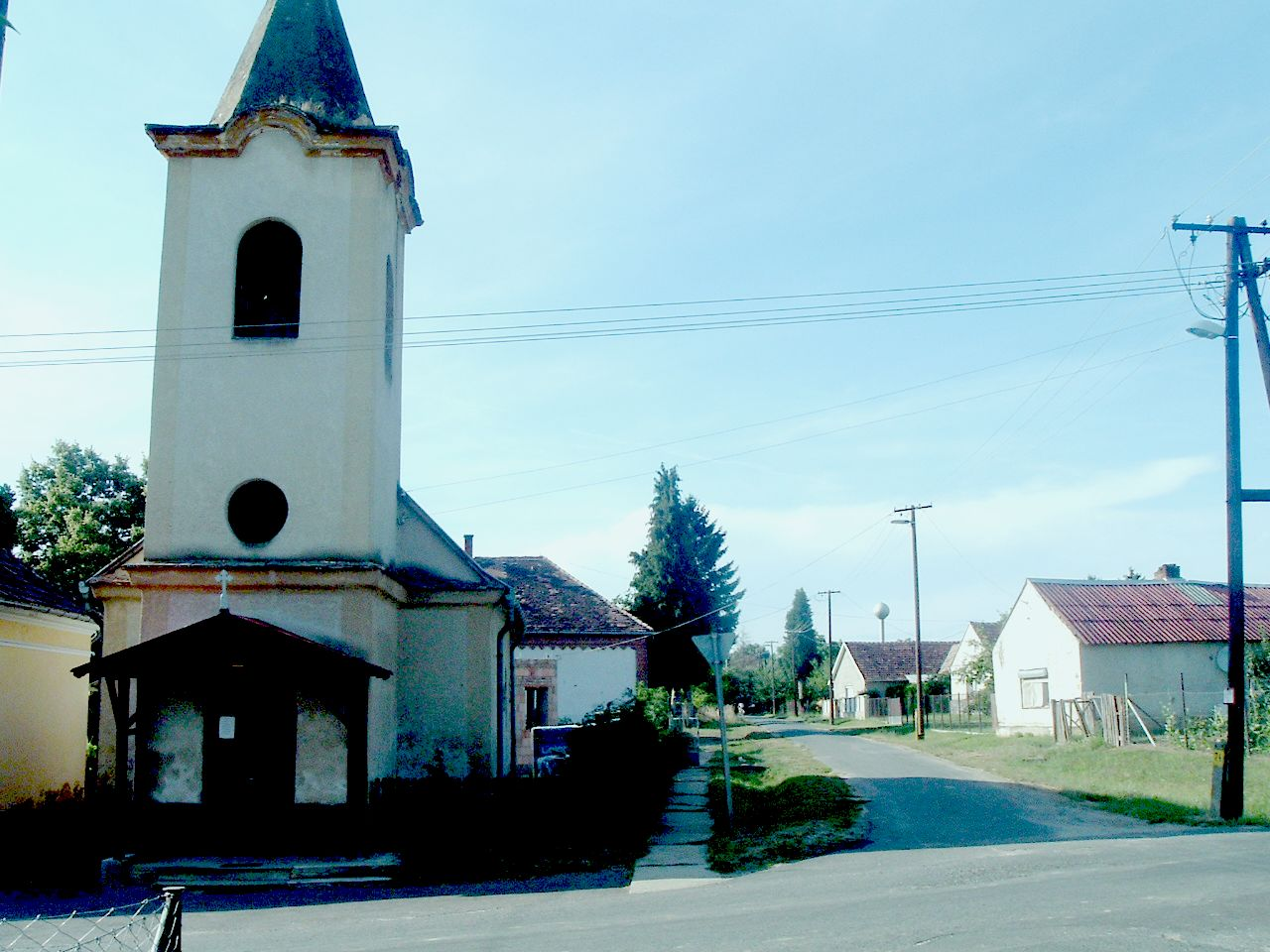
The church in Alsótelekes

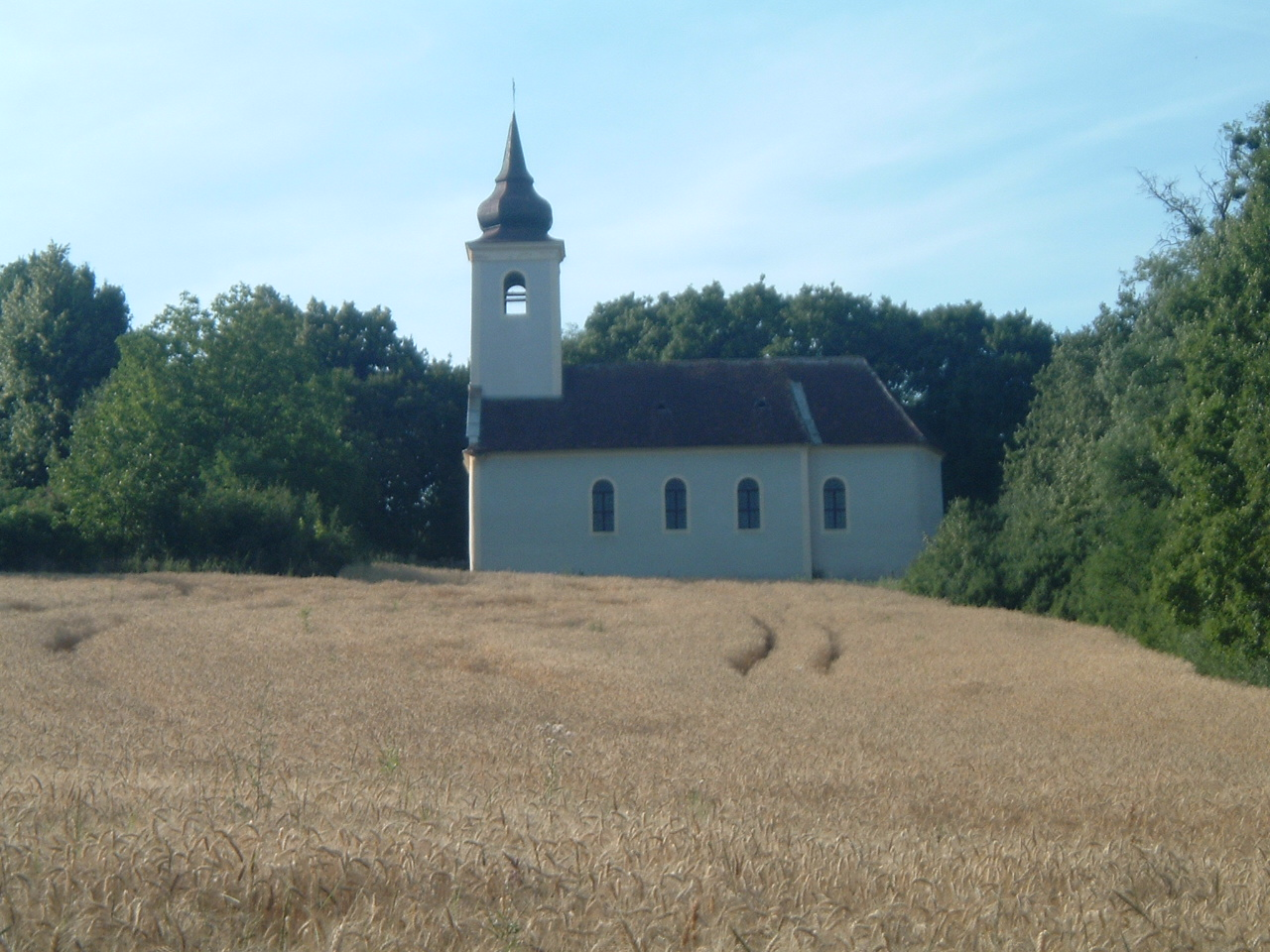
The church in Felsőtelekes
