= Balog de Manko Bük =

Austrian-Hungarian noble family

Balog de Manko Bük Mankóbüki Balogh Balog von Manko Bück
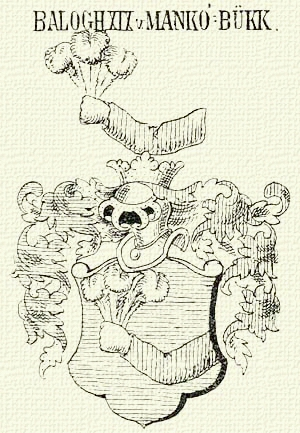
- Country: Habsburg monarchy (1549 - 1918)
- Current region: Vienna, Budapest, Paris
- Origin: Sopron County
- Founded: 1549
- Founder: János Balogh de Mankó Bük
- Connected families: Madách de Sztregova et Kelecsény, Freiherren Wagner von Wehrborn, Keresztes-Fischer
- Distinctions: Imperial Order of the Iron Crown
- Estates: Bük, Mesterházy castle

Balogh von Mankobük, mankóbüki Balogh in Hungarian, was an Austro-Hungarian noble family of the Habsburg monarchy, originating from Mankóbük in Sopron County (German: Ödenburg; Hungarian: Sopron). The family had their ancient estate in what today is the city of Bük. A branch settled in Vienna around the 1830s after serving in the Austrian Imperial Army and later a sub-branch settled in Budapest. Their origins date back to the beginning of the Habsburg rule of the Kingdom of Hungary and are documented in the area of Bük since 1549.

== Family history ==
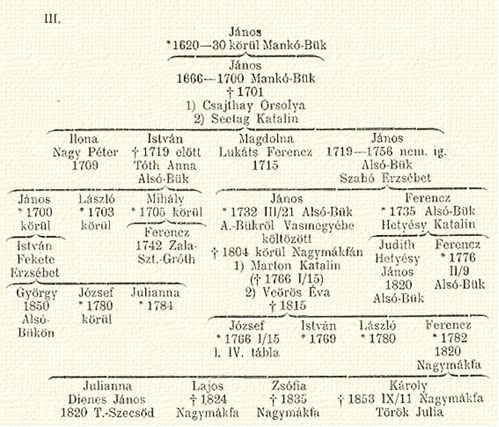
Genealogy Balogh de Mankóbük since 1620

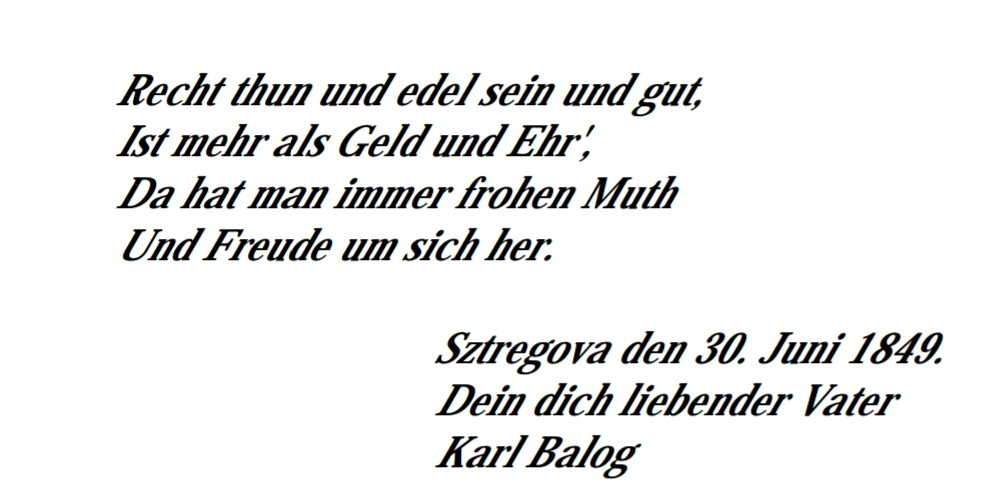
Balog de Manko Bück

The family occupied positions in the Empire state administration mainly in the military, judiciary and regional government across generations. Male members mainly either served in the Austrian Imperial Army and the subsequent Austro-Hungarian Army, or dedicated themselves towards the affairs of state, primarily through judicial positions of legal or administrative nature, in either governmental institutions of the Habsburg monarchy or Hungarian Ministries.

The first written mention of a Manko Bük family is recorded in 1351 as "Monko de Byky" and later in the person of "Johannes Manko de Byk" in 1451.

The published genealogical family tree of the "Balogh Mankóbüki" traced their roots back to the early 1600s, namely with the brothers Lörinez (1618) and János (1620). Gáspar Balogh de Mankóbük, jurist of the Sopron county had been documented in the area of Bük back in 1552 while records show that János Balogh de Mankóbük (mankóbüki Balogh János) owned property in Bük already in 1549.

A branch of the family left Bük in the late 18th century due to the military postings of captain Josef Balog de Mankó-Bük (1766–1842), who served in the army during the Napoleonic Wars for the Austrian Empire. While a branch of the family remained in the area of Bük, the descendants of the captain settled in Vienna around 1837 and remained there.

However, because of the sudden murder of the captain's youngest son, Rittmeister (Cavalry Captain) Karl Balog de Mánko-Bük (1808-1849), the captain's grandson was raised by his uncle, Imre Madách de Sztregova et Kelecsény author of The Tragedy of Man, one of the most famous works of Hungarian literature, at castle Madách. The Madách castle is currently owned by the Slovak National Museum and operates since 2003 as a division of the Museum of Hungarian Culture in Slovakia.

Family members were mainly concentrated in Vienna and Budapest. Some fled communist Hungary after World War II and settled in Paris, becoming French citizens.

== Coat of arms ==
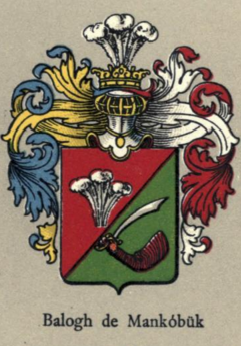
Liber Armorum Hungariae

The first published coat of arms is found in the volume "Der Adel von Ungarn samt den Nebenländern der St.Stephanskrone" (Nobility of Hungary and the Lands of the Crown of Saint Stephen) of the renowned German-speaking heraldic works "Siebmachers Großes Wappenbuch" of 1893, printed in Nuremberg. It shows a red dressed arm with three Ostrich Feathers in the fist and appears under the Germanized name Balogh v. Mankó Bükk.

A later coat of arms was published in "Liber Armorum Hungariae" by the foreign minister of Austria-Hungary Count Gyula Andrássy in Budapest in 1913. This version is richer and more colourful, three Ostrich Feathers stand now on their own as well as on the crown at the top, the red dressed arm holds a sword in its fist instead of the feathers it held previously. Green, blue and yellow are used additionally, and the family name appears with the Latin suffix "de" instead of the Germanic "von" as Balogh de Mankóbük.

Both versions are good examples of Hungarian Heraldry under Habsburg rule.

== Expropriation of Castle Mesterházy ==
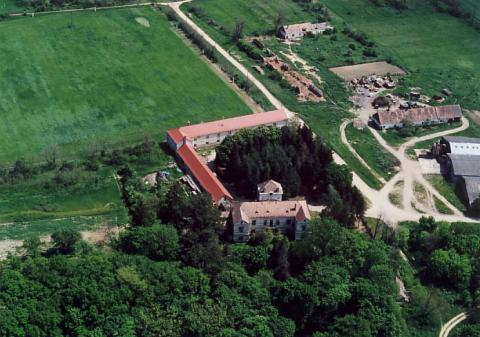
Kastély Potypusztán - Mesterházy kastély

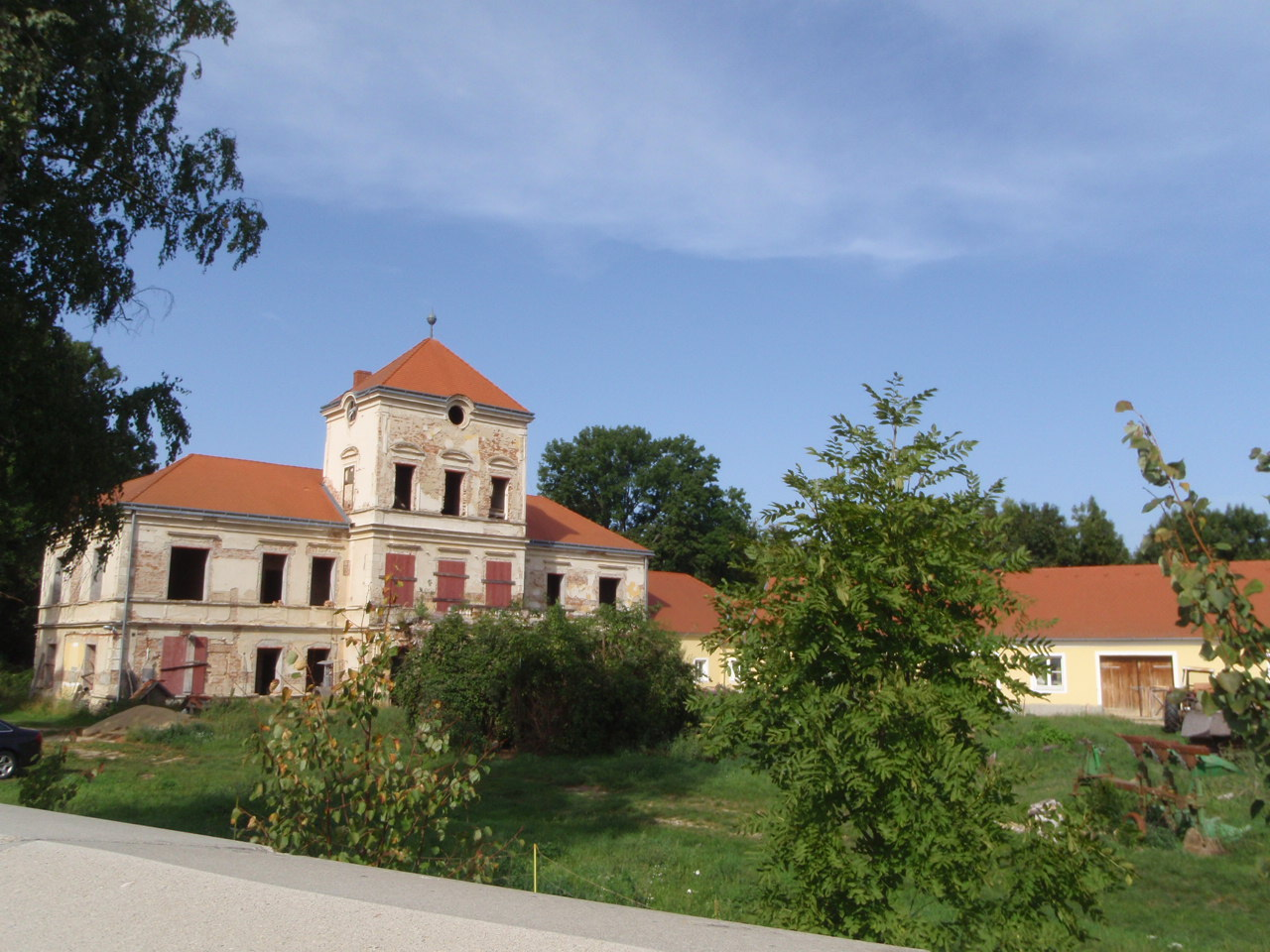
Kastély Potypusztán - Mesterházy kastély

The Balogh Mankóbüki were owners of the castle Mesterházy (Mesterházy kastély), in the village of Csehimindszent in the Vas County (Eisenburg) until it was expropriated by the communist government in 1945.

The estate had belonged to the Mesterházy noble family since 1871 but came to the possession of Aladár Balogh de Manko Bük through his marriage with the widow of Gyula Mesterházy (1869–1914) in 1915. It was renovated in 1929.

It was originally built by the Croatian Counts of Festetics de Tolna (Austro-Hungarian princes since 1911) around 1782 and was later acquired by the zalabéri Horváth noble family in 1839 and lastly by the Mesterházy's in 1871 until 1914.

The property was taken from the Balogh de Mankobük family and forcefully nationalized by the Hungarian government after the end of World War II, in 1945. It was subsequently used by the state for different public activities during the following decades.

== Karl Balog de Mánko-Bük ==
He was born in 1766 in Bük and died in 1842 in Vienna. The captain had been stationed in 1795 in Kőszeg, which was the seat of the district administration, as lawyer of the Transdanubian District Board (Kőszegi Kerületi Táblanak). This institution had been founded in 1724 and was responsible for Nobles's property, inheritance and other financial matters. His military career took him through Temeswar and Karlsburg in the Principality of Transylvania, (today in Romania), as well as Brno and Olomouc in Moravia (today in the Czech Republic). He fought during the Napoleonic Wars for the Austrian Empire.

The captains oldest son, Oberleutnant Josef Balog v. Manko-Bük (1801 in Temeswar), lived in Fürstenfeld (Styria) and Königsdorf during his active military career.

== Anton Balog de Manko-Bük ==
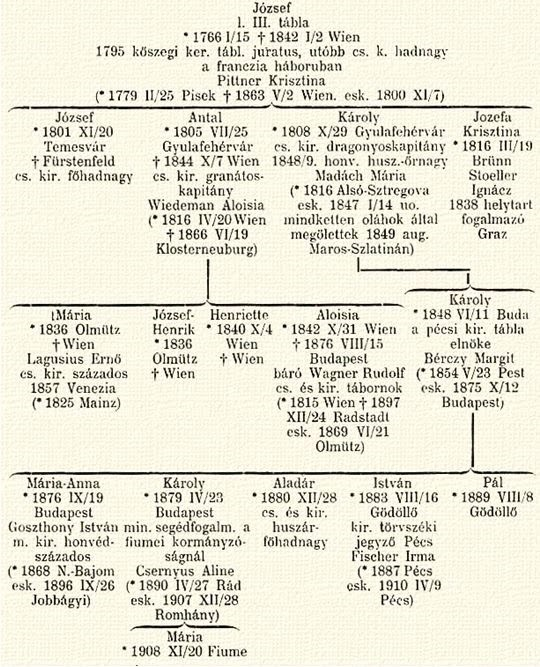
Genealogy of Balogh de Mankó Bük since 1766

Born in Karlsburg (25 July 1805), Principality of Transylvania, Austrian Empire (today Alba Iulia, Romania), as son of Captain Josef Balog de Mankó-Bük (1766–1842).

He attended the Theresian Military Academy at Wiener Neustadt, near Vienna, in 1817. He became Fähnrich or Officer Candidate on 21 October 1825 at the Hungarian k.k regiment "Erzhog Albrecht" n.44. In 1830 he ascended to Lieutenant, was promoted to Oberleutnant in 1834 and to Hauptmann (captain) on 1 January 1836.

He was Adjutant of "His Excellency / Seiner Exzellenz" Feldmarschall-Leutnant Baron Lauer.

He married Aloysia v. Widemann (Vienna 1816 - Klosterneuburg 1866), daughter of an Hauptmann-Auditor, with whom he had four children. Anton (Hung. Antal) Balog de Manko-Bük died on 7 October 1844 in Vienna.

== Aloysia Balog de Manko-Bück ==
She was born in Vienna on 31 October 1842 and died in Budapest on 15 August 1876. She was the daughter of Captain Anton Balog de Manko-Bük (1805–1844) and spouse of the General-Major Rudolf Freiherr Wagner von Wehrborn (Vienna 1815 - Radstadt 1897), who was a knight of the Military Order of Maria Theresia. They married in Olomouc (Moravia) on 21 June 1869.

German princes of both the House of Glücksburg (Schleswig-Holstein) and the House of Lippe-Weissenfeld are direct descendants of the marriage between Rudolf, the first Baron Wagner von Wehrborn and Aloysia Balog de Manko Bück.

== Károly Balogh de Mankobük ==
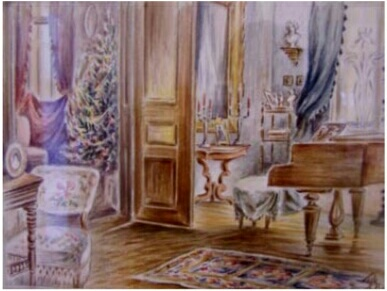
Biedermeier interior of Imre Mádach home in Budapest, Painted by Károly Balogh

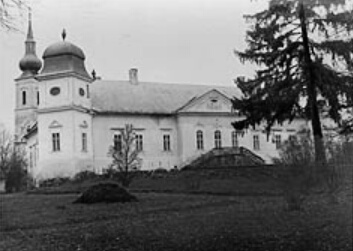
Castle Madách in Alsósztregova, (today Dolná Strehová, Slovakia)

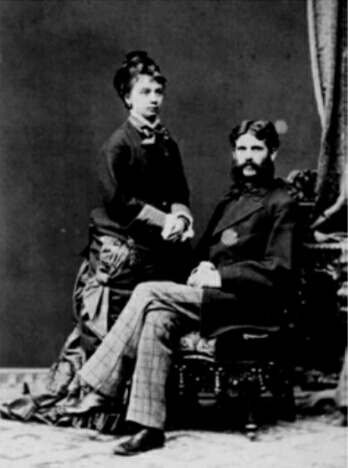
Károly Balog v. Mankobük Jr., nephew of the Hungarian writer Imre Madách, with wife Margit Bérczy de Gyarmat

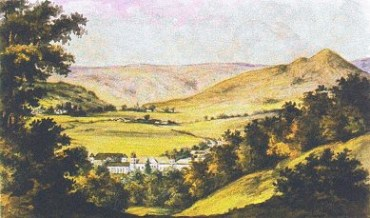
View of Alsósztregova Watercolour, painted by Károly Balogh

Born in Buda (11 June 1848) and died in Pécs (9 April 1920), Károly was a judge and later president of the Royal Court (Tabula Regia or Király Tábla in Hungarian) in Pécs as well as a knight of the Order of the Iron Crown.

He was the son of Karl Balog de Mánko-Bük (1808–1849), captain at the Imperial Dragoons cavalry Regiment "König Ludwig von Bayern" in the Austrian Imperial Army, and his wife Mária Madách de Sztregova et Kelecsény (1816–1849), daughter of an imperial and royal chamberlain and landowner.

His father had been wounded in Transylvania during a major battle in Temesvár, fighting in the Hungarian Revolution of 1848, so his mother went to assist him. Károly became an orphan at barely the age of one when both his parents were murdered by armed Romanian peasants in the summer of 1849, during their journey back home. At the time of the tragedy he had been left behind with his grandmother at the Madách castle in Alsósztregova (present-day Dolná Strehová, Slovakia).

He was raised by his uncle, the famous writer Imre Madách, who took him in his care and raised him together with his own son, Aladár, at the Madách family castle. Traits from that common family history can still be found today in the Slovak National Museum since the department of Museum of Hungarian Culture in Slovakia is based both in Bratislava and in the Madách Castle. Both the garden and the castle are open to the public as part of the Slovak National Museum permanent exhibition.

He studied law in Pressburg, (Pozsony, today's Bratislava) and worked for the Ministry of Justice, eventually becoming president of the Royal Court in Pécs.

He had artistic pursuits in his spare time, mostly through painting and poetry. He illustrated tales and children's books of the Hungarian novelist Kálmán Mikszáth de Kiscsoltó as well.

He married Margaret Bérczy de Gyarmat, daughter of the notorious poet and editor Károly Bérczy de Gyarmat, in Budapest (12 October 1875). In 1912, at the age of 64, he wrote his memoirs "Gyermekkorom emlékei" or "Memories of childhood".

He was awarded the Imperial Order of the Iron Crown Second Class (Kaiserlicher Orden der Eisernen Krone) for his civil merits in 1914.

== Károly Balogh de Mankobük Jr. ==
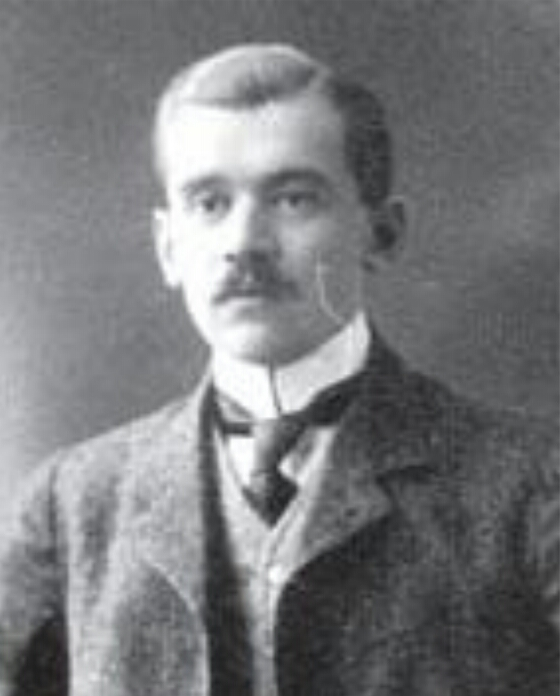
Károly Balogh de Mankobük

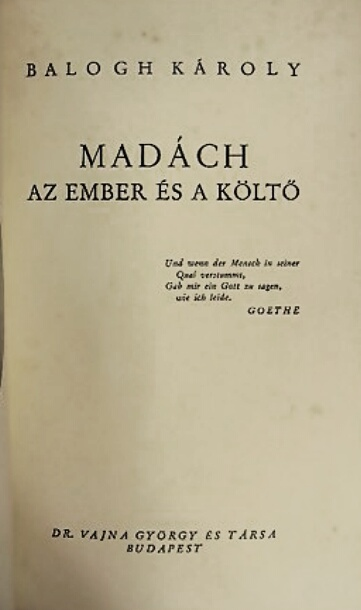
Published works of Károly Balogh about Madách

Károly Balogh de Mankobük Jr. was born in Budapest on 23 June 1879 and died in Balassagyarmat on 24 April 1944.

He was a Minister Counsellor at the Hungarian ministry of interior and a literary historian and translator for the Hungarian government. He had also been a judge and member of the government of the Hungarian city port of Fiume until World War I.

He was the eldest son of Károly Balogh de Mankóbük and Margaret Bérczy and was married to Aline Csernyus de Kökeszi (1890–1985).

After working as a judge in the Szécsény and Balassagyarmat area from 1903 to 1907 he started working in the government of Fiume as ministerial draftsman at the maritime authority of the Governorate from 1907 to 1911. Fiume, (modern Rijeka, Croatia), was an autonomous entity under jurisdiction of Hungary known as "Corpus separatum".

He later became the Fiume ministerial regency draftsman, assistant secretary, and then secretary (1911–1915) until he had to serve in the Austro-Hungarian Army at a combat zone, due to World War I (1915–1918).

He went into hiding after the collapse of the Austria-Hungary (1918) and later took part in the liquidation of the Fiume governorship (1919–1920).

He settled down in Pécs (1923–1934) where he was interim head of the University of Pécs Elisabeth library (1927–1930). He then became president of the Translation Department, since he had had Ministerial Adviser rank from 1920 to 1943, at the Hungarian Ministry of Interior or Belügyminisztérium.

He was a member of the prestigious Kisfaludy Society since 1942 specialising in the cultural history of ancient Rome and medieval German poetry and wrote for the main German-speaking newspaper in Hungary, the Pester Lloyd from Budapest.

He was awarded the Horváth Endre price posthumously in 1989 by the city of Balassagyarmat.

== Aladár Balog de Mankobük ==
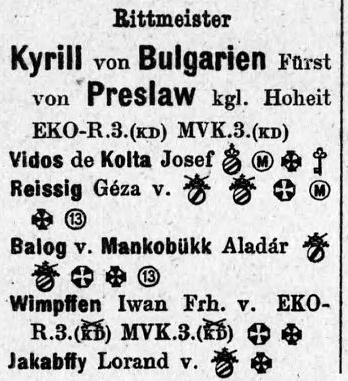
Balog v. Mankobükk (Hussaren-Regiment Nr. 11) 1918.

Aladár was born the 28. December 1880 in Budapest and became a cadette at the 11.Husaren-Regiment in 1898. By 1906 he was already Oberleutnant and Rittmeister by 1914.

He served in the Austro-Hungarian Army throughout the entire First World War under the command of the Prince of the Kingdom of Bulgaria, Kyrill von Bulgarien Fürst von Preslaw as well as under the Heir apparent to the Bulgarian throne, Major Boris Kronpriz von Bulgarien Fürst von Tirnowo until 1918.

He fought during the Balkan Wars, in 1912–1913 as well. By 1918, the end of the War and the dissolution of his regiment, he had been distinguished with both Bronze and Silver Military Merit Medals among other recognitions.

He married Angela Nagy de Szentkirály, the widow of Gyula Mesterházy de Mesterháza, in 1915.

== Pál Balogh de Mankobük ==
Mankóbüki Balogh Pál (i.e. Paul) was born on 25 January 1890 in Transylvania, Kingdom of Hungary.

He obtained his degree in political science in Budapest and joined the financial clerk from 1924 to 1934. In 1934 he joined the Ministry of Defence, where he addressed issues such as care for war orphans, child protection and social security.

In 1945 he transferred to the Ministry of Social Welfare where he was head of the military care management department and 1946 became deputy head of the same department.

At the same time he actively participated in the resistance movement known as the Magyar Közösség, a secret organization operating along the lines of the Freemason movement, but with a strong Hungarian nationalist character. Their goal was to get their members into influential positions in the state administration and economical sphere.

He worked at the Ministry until his retirement in 1949. He remained active in the private sector working for Insurance companies such as the French insurance company at the Fonciére-palota in the Andrássy avenue and at the State Insurance Company.

In the summer of 1951 the leadership of the then communist Hungarian People's Republic decided to deport the so-called "undesired persons" (former high-ranking civil servants, soldiers, landowners) from Budapest.

Dr.Pál and his family had their home in Budapest (Zugló district) expropriated and were deported to the village of Gyulaháza, which they could only leave with police permission, under the accusation of "kulak" or "enemy of democracy".

== Balogh – French company from 1958 to 2016 ==
Balogh Group

The Balogh Group has its headquarters in Paris and is the French leader company in the development and manufacturing of contactless identification systems, offering the most advanced RFID technologies in the industry.

It was founded in 1958 by Paul Balogh de Manko-Bük (8 April 1924 in Pécs – 16 January 2007 in Paris), and his wife Claire. Paul (Pal) had been an academic during his civilian life and an elite pilot during the Second World War. He served within the elite fighter "Puma" unit of the Royal Hungarian Air Force and took a soviet Yak-9 down in 1945 while defending Vienna from Russian bombing.

He fled Hungary and settled in Paris after the collapse of the Kingdom of Hungary following the defeat of World War II and soviet occupation.

The Balogh Group started out manufacturing Inductive Proximity Sensors, which then lead to the development of Radio Frequency Identification (RFID) in 1978. Since then the Balogh Group has expanded globally with the creation of Balogh USA in 1988 and the creation of Balogh International in 1990.

Nowadays it has three research and development facilities, one in Paris, one in Toulouse (France) and one in Detroit, Michigan (United States). All three also serve as production facilities, in addition to the one in Normandy.

The company operated globally, mainly in Europe and the United States, having applications in a variety of industries, such as Automotive, Food Processing, Pharmaceutical, Transportation, Railways or Aircraft.

The former CEO, Etienne Balogh de Manko-Bük, born in 1962, joined 1987 and became president in 1994. He holds a business and marketing degree from the IDRAC Ecole supérieure de commerce and HEC Management. Since 2016 he was the International Sales Director for Rail Solutions at TagMaster.

BALOGH was acquired by and integrated into the Stockholm-based Swedish multinational Tagmaster in August 2016 .

== Other notable members ==
- Lajos Balogh mankóbüki (1812–1850): evangelical pastor.
- István Balogh mankóbüki (Gödöllő, 1883): lawyer and academic in Pécs.
- Lajos Balogh (Bük, 1933): Hungarian linguist and University Professor at the Eötvös Loránd University of Budapest. Bálint Csűry Medal (1977) and Dezső Pais Prize (2006).
- Charles Balogh de Manko-Bük (Paris, 1957): French maxillofacial surgeon in Grenoble.
