= Döröske =

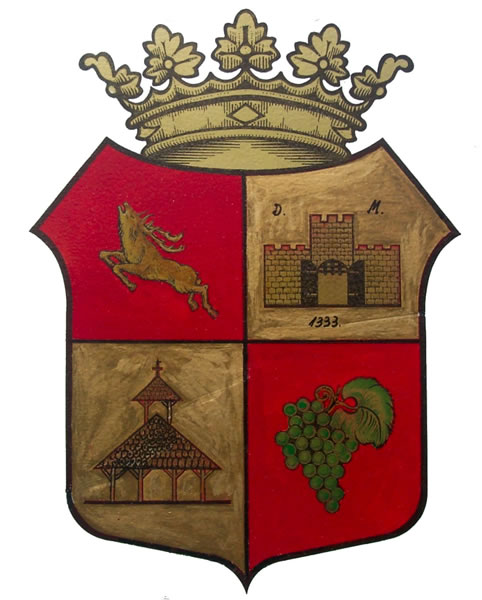
- Seal

- Location of Vas county in Hungary

- Location of Döröske
- Coordinates: 47.01133°N 16.69643°E
- Country: Hungary
- County: Vas

Area
  - Total: 4.41 km^{2} (1.70 sq mi)

Population (2025)
  - Total: 136
  - Density: 26.14/km^{2} (67.7/sq mi)
- Time zone: UTC+1 (CET)
  - Summer (DST): UTC+2 (CEST)
- Postal code: 9913
- Area code: 94

Döröske is a village in Vas County, Hungary.

== Location ==
Döröske is situated 12 kilometers East of Körmend, near highway No. 8. Molnaszecsőd lies 4 kilometers from the village. The neighbouring villages are Molnaszecsőd, Magyarszecsőd, Döbörhegy, and Szarvaskend.

== History ==
The village is mentioned in a charter from 1244, in which the old church of the village, which can now be found in the cemetery, is described. The second charter mentions that the landowner of the village was Monkus Miklós, who took the land for 5 years from the son of Marcellus of Saar. In the 19th century, the village had a population of between 300 and 400. In the 20th century, it grew to almost 500 before declining again to the current level.

== Features ==
The Roman Catholic Church was built in the 13th century in the Romanesque style. The church is dedicated to Saint Jacob apostle, the junior. The church stands in the cemetery. It was renovated in recent years.

The old fortress stands at the Fő út 6 house garden. It was a fortified tower in the Árpád age.
