= Szarvaskend =

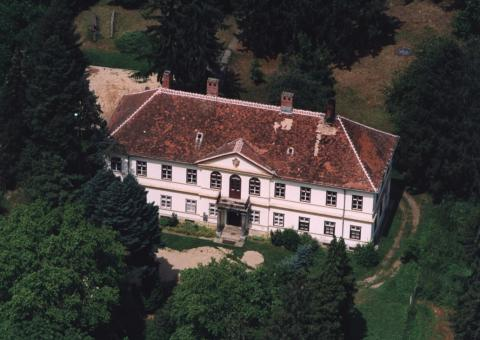
- Aerial photograph of Szarvaskend's palace

- Location of Vas county in Hungary

- Location of Szarvaskend
- Coordinates: 46.98938°N 16.67555°E
- Country: Hungary
- County: Vas

Government
  - Mayor: Somogyi Nikolett Viola (Ind.)

Area
  - Total: 10.34 km^{2} (3.99 sq mi)

Population (2022)
  - Total: 206
  - Density: 19.9/km^{2} (51.6/sq mi)
- Time zone: UTC+1 (CET)
  - Summer (DST): UTC+2 (CEST)
- Postal code: 9913
- Area code: 94

Szarvaskend is a small village in Vas County, in the Western Transdanubia region of Hungary. It lies within the Körmend district (Körmendi járás), in the historical wine-growing countryside near the towns of Körmend, Szombathely, and Zalaegerszeg.

== Geography ==
Szarvaskend is situated at approximately 46°59′0″ N, 16°41′0″ E. The surrounding landscape is characterized by deep valleys and hills typical of the southern Vas country, an area historically known for viticulture, with old vineyards and wine cellars scattered across the countryside

Nearby settlements include the villages of Döröske and Gersekarát, which are also associated with small lakes The nearest larger towns are:

- Körmend — the district seat
- Szombathely — approximately 34 Km away, the county capital
- Zalaegerszeg — approximately 22 km away

== Demographics ==
In accordance with the most recent available figures, the village has a population of approximately 204-206, making it one of the smaller settlements in the district.

== Landmarks ==
The village is home to the church of Mary's Visitation, a local landmark mentioned in regional tourism and real estate descriptions of the area.

== Local administration ==
The municipality maintains its own official website (in Hungarian only), which serves as the primary source for local administrative and civic information.

== Acces ==
For travelers, the closest airports are located at Sármellék (~49 km away), with car rental services available from nearby towns such as Zalaegerszeg and Szombathely.
