= List of untitled nobility of Austria-Hungary =

This page lists untitled noble families, or whose title is unclear, in the territories of the Austro-Hungarian Empire, whether extant or extinct.

Preposition	Family	Current name	Notes
	Adamovich de Csepin	Adamovich	
de / von	Balogh de Mankó Bük	Balog de Manko Bück	since 1719
von	Benda	Benda	
von	Beranek von Bernhorst	Beranek	since 1866
von	Doderer	Doderer	
von	Einem	Einem	
von	Gera	Gera	
	Hofmann von Hofmannsthal		
von	Hornbostel	Hornbostel	
von	Harakaly	Harakaly	
rethey	Klebersz-Kelepcsics	Klebercz von Rethe	since 1633
von	Launsky	Launsky	
von	Mendelssohn	Mendelssohn	
von	Neumann	Neumann	
von	Löwenthal-Linau	van Cleeff	
von	Ofenheim	Ofenheim	
von	Rigel	Rigel	
von	Rottal	Rottal	
von	Saar	Saar	
de	Saeger	Saeger	since 1731
von	Freiherr Wetzlar von Plankenstern	Freiherr Wetzler von Plankenstern	since 1683
von	Zepharovich	Zepharovich	
von	Zumbusch	Zumbusch	
de	Schaller	de Schaller-Baross	

== Notes ==
Where this section is blank, it is possible that the preposition is unknown or did not exist.
