= Csehimindszent =

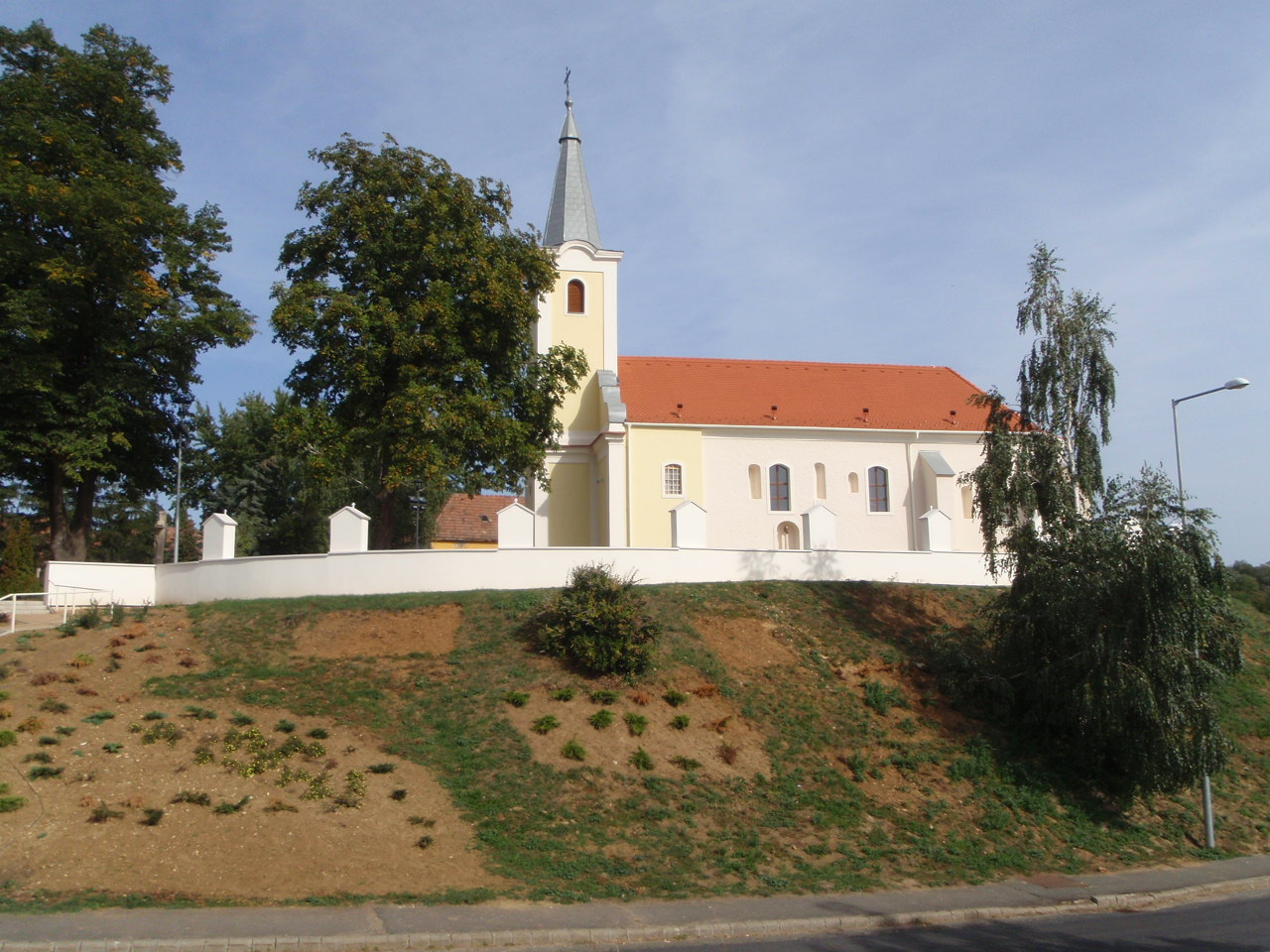
- Church of All Saints with the Calvary

- Flag Coat of arms

- Location of Vas county in Hungary

- Location of Csehimindszent
- Coordinates: 47.04859°N 16.95334°E
- Country: Hungary
- County: Vas

Area
  - Total: 15.43 km^{2} (5.96 sq mi)

Population (2004)
  - Total: 421
  - Density: 27.28/km^{2} (70.7/sq mi)
- Time zone: UTC+1 (CET)
  - Summer (DST): UTC+2 (CEST)
- Postal code: 9834
- Area code: 94
- Website: https://csehimindszent.hu/

Csehimindszent (formerly Csehi-Mindszent) is a village in Vas County, Western Hungary.

== Famous people ==
- József Mindszenty (Pehm) was born in Csehimindszent in 1892.

== Nearby municipalities ==
- Csehi
- Olaszfa
- Csipkerek, Potypuszta
- Mikosdpuszta, Mikosdszéplak
- Vasvár
