= Bük =

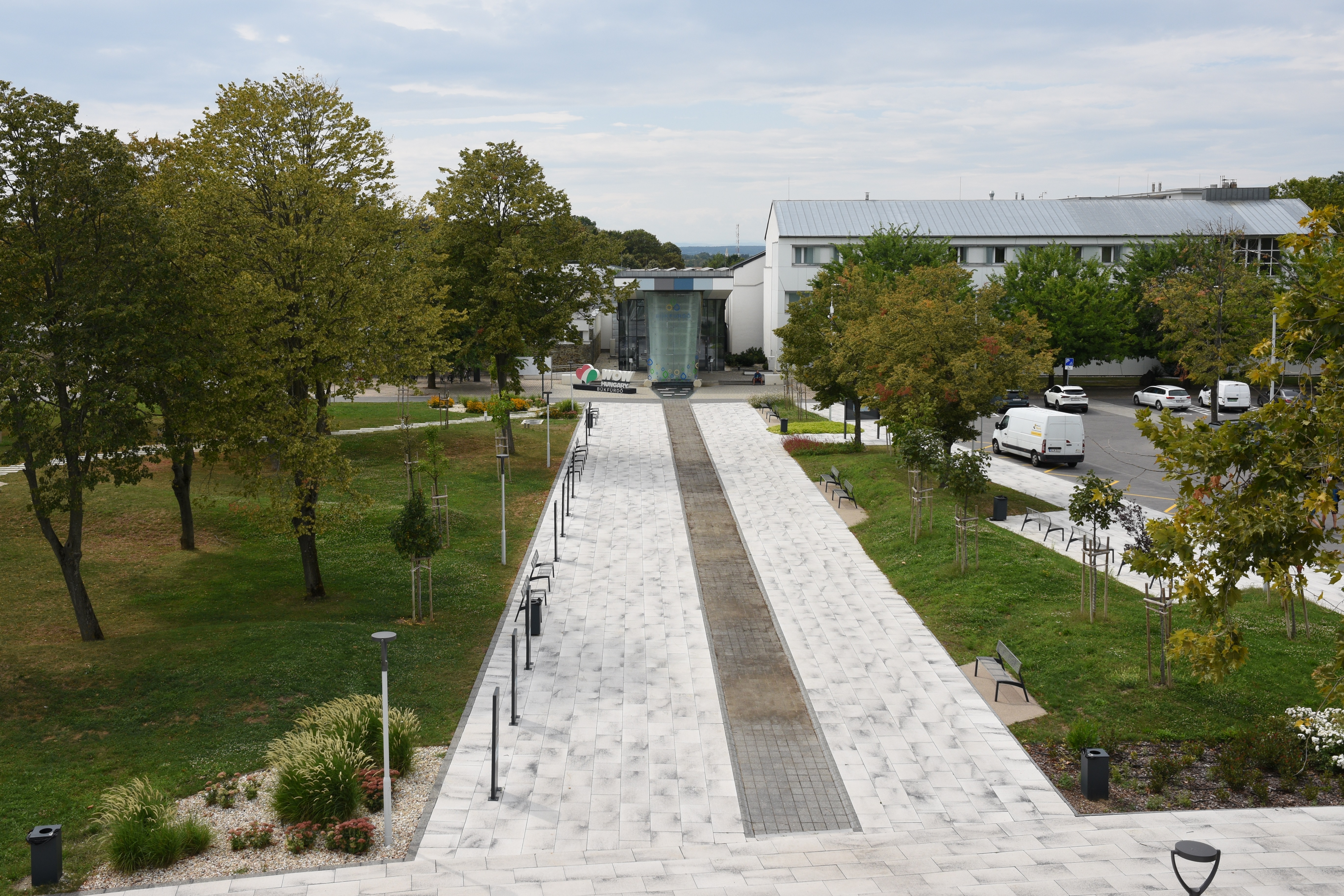
- Bük thermal bath

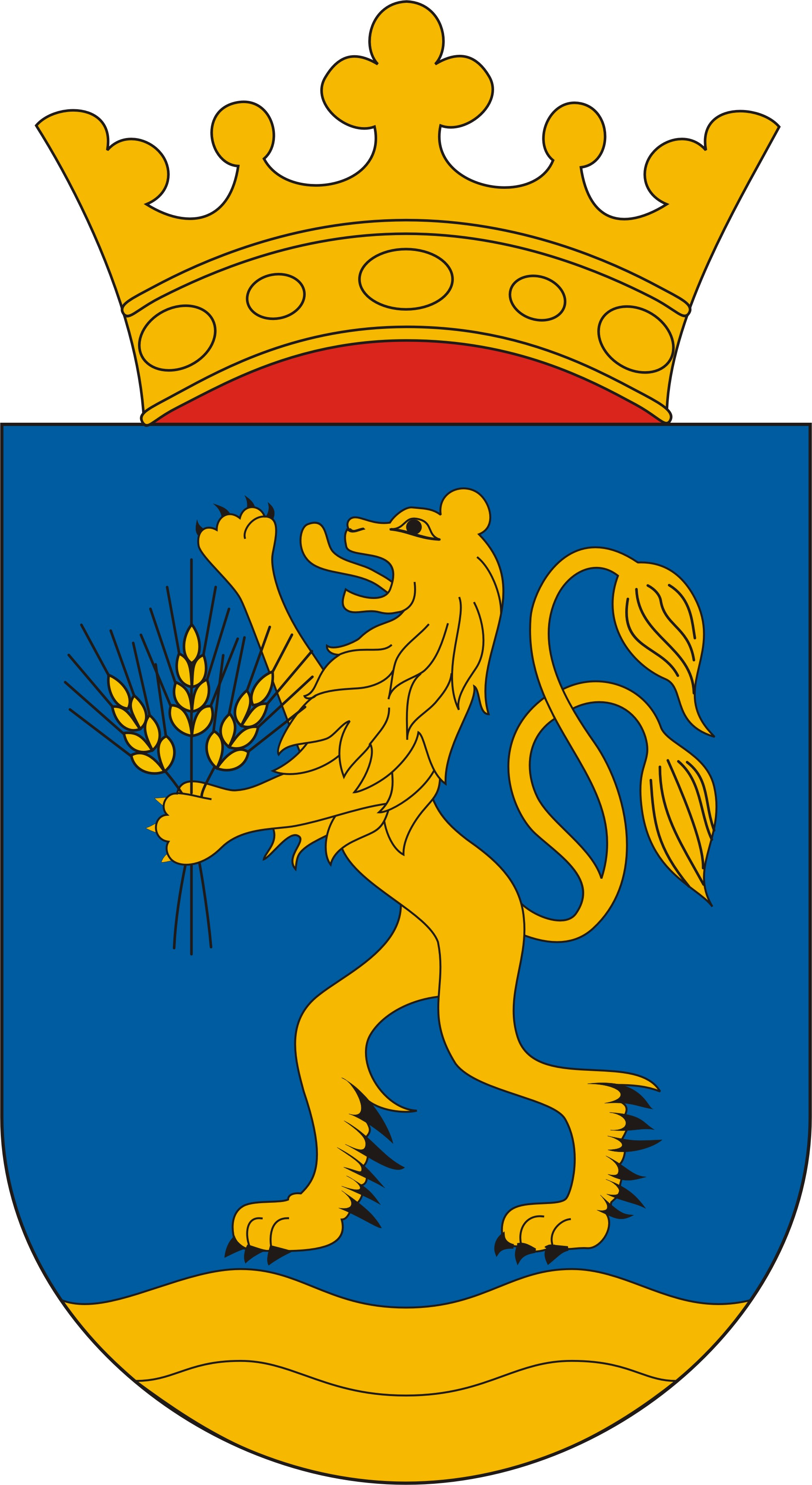
- Seal

- Location of Vas county in Hungary

- Location of Bük
- Coordinates: 47.38445°N 16.75094°E
- Country: Hungary
- County: Vas

Area
  - Total: 20.88 km^{2} (8.06 sq mi)

Population (2015)
  - Total: 3,544
  - Density: 169.7/km^{2} (439.6/sq mi)
- Time zone: UTC+1 (CET)
  - Summer (DST): UTC+2 (CEST)
- Postal code: 9737
- Area code: 94

Bük is a town in Vas County, Hungary, close to the Austrian border. Nowadays it has a reputation for being a popular holiday destination in Hungary and one of the major spa and wellness spots in Central Europe.

== Location ==
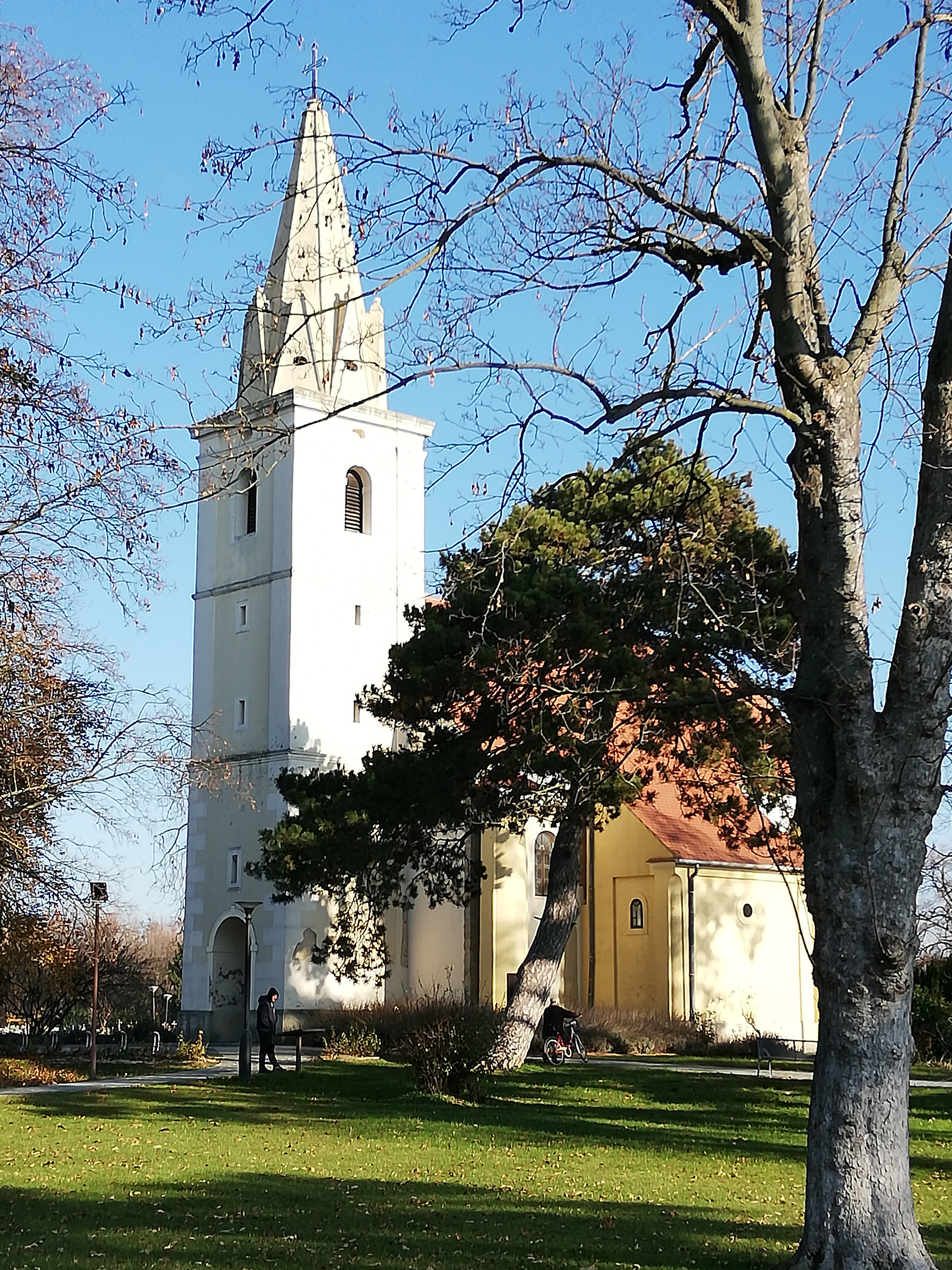
Roman Catholic Church with romanesque details

The town is situated 27 kilometers from Szombathely at the Répce-river plains.

== History ==
The village is first mentioned in charters in 1271 with the name: Byk. The church was built in the 12th century, so the village is even older. In 1461 the name of the village is Poss. Vinchefalwa Byk. The name corresponds to the old Vinczlófalva-Bik, which is now called Felső-Bükk. In the 15th century there were three Bik villages (Alsó-Bük, Mankó-Bük and Felsö-Bük). The Büki Family was the landowner. Their descendants were the Mankóbüki Horváth, Mankóbüki Balogh and the Felsőbüki Nagy families. Pál Felsőbüki Nagy was a famous member of the Hungarian House of Representatives in the 19th century. Other notable landowners were the Counts Cseszneky who bought Alsóbük in the 16th century.

== Sights ==
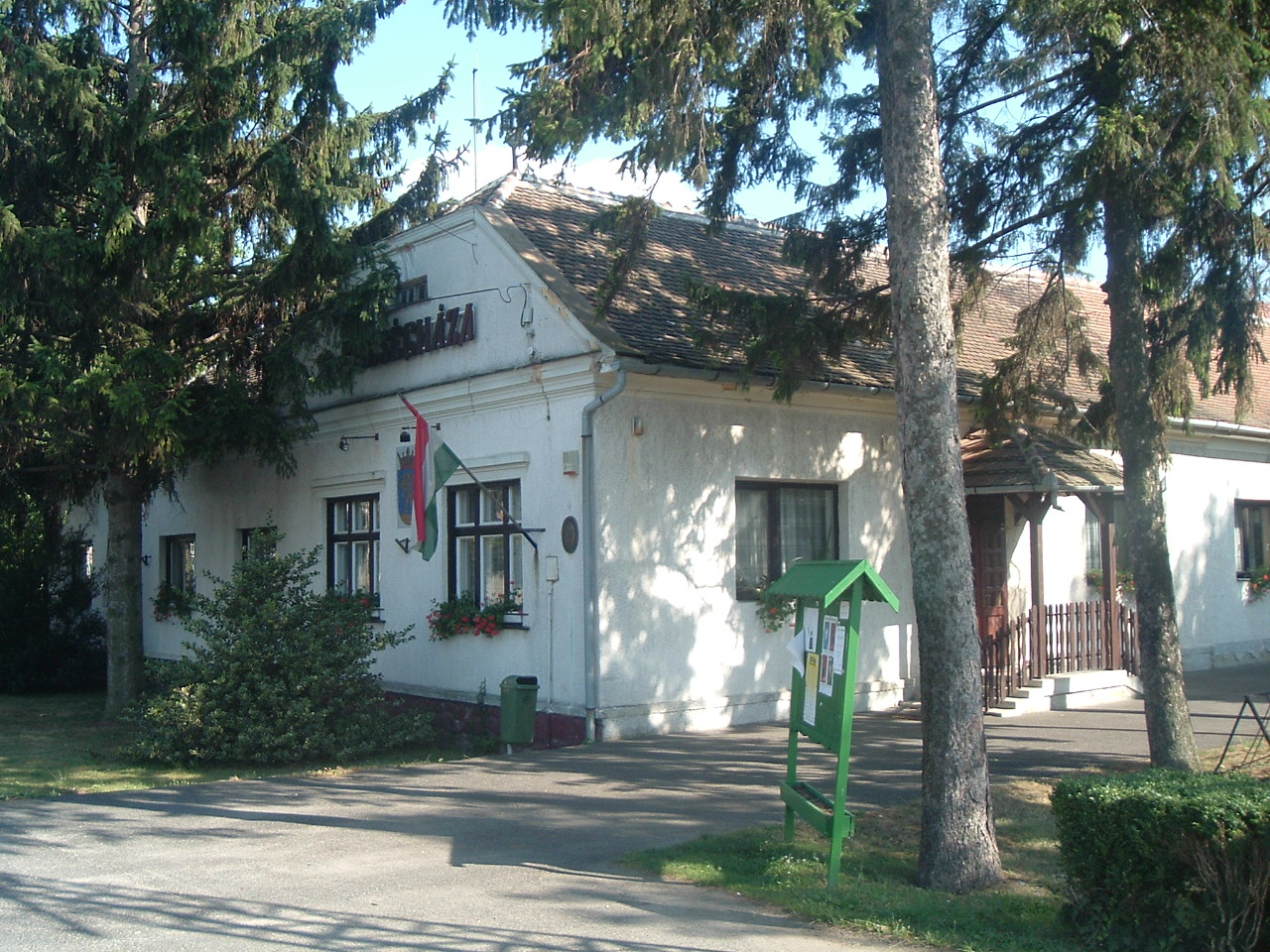
The town hall

=== Baths ===
In the autumn of 1957, an investigation was made to establish the presence of oil in the region, but a hot water spring was found. The town built a baths in 1962. Later the water became a medical water and a new baths was erected in 1972 for all year use of the hot water baths. Around the bath several camp sites, hotels, boutiques, pensions and restaurants were built and in 1992 the 'recreation park' was opened as well. Today the bath in Bük is the second largest medicinal bath in Hungary. One of the most well known hotels in Bük is the Birdland Resort & Spa, which was awarded the Best Hungarian Wellness Hotel in 2007.

=== Árpád age church ===
The church was devoted to the patrician of St Caliman, built in the 13th century. Later restored in gothic style (in 1408), and its tower was rebuilt in 1658. Between 1732 and 1757 the whole church building was renewed in baroque style. The murals are from this period. The virgin Mary Column is from the 18th century.

=== Old palace of the Felsőbüki Family ===
The old palace of the Felsőbüki Family was founded around 1790 by Pál Felsőbüki Nagy. Originally it was formed in the so-called coptic style. Later, in 1880 it was renewed in eclectic style.

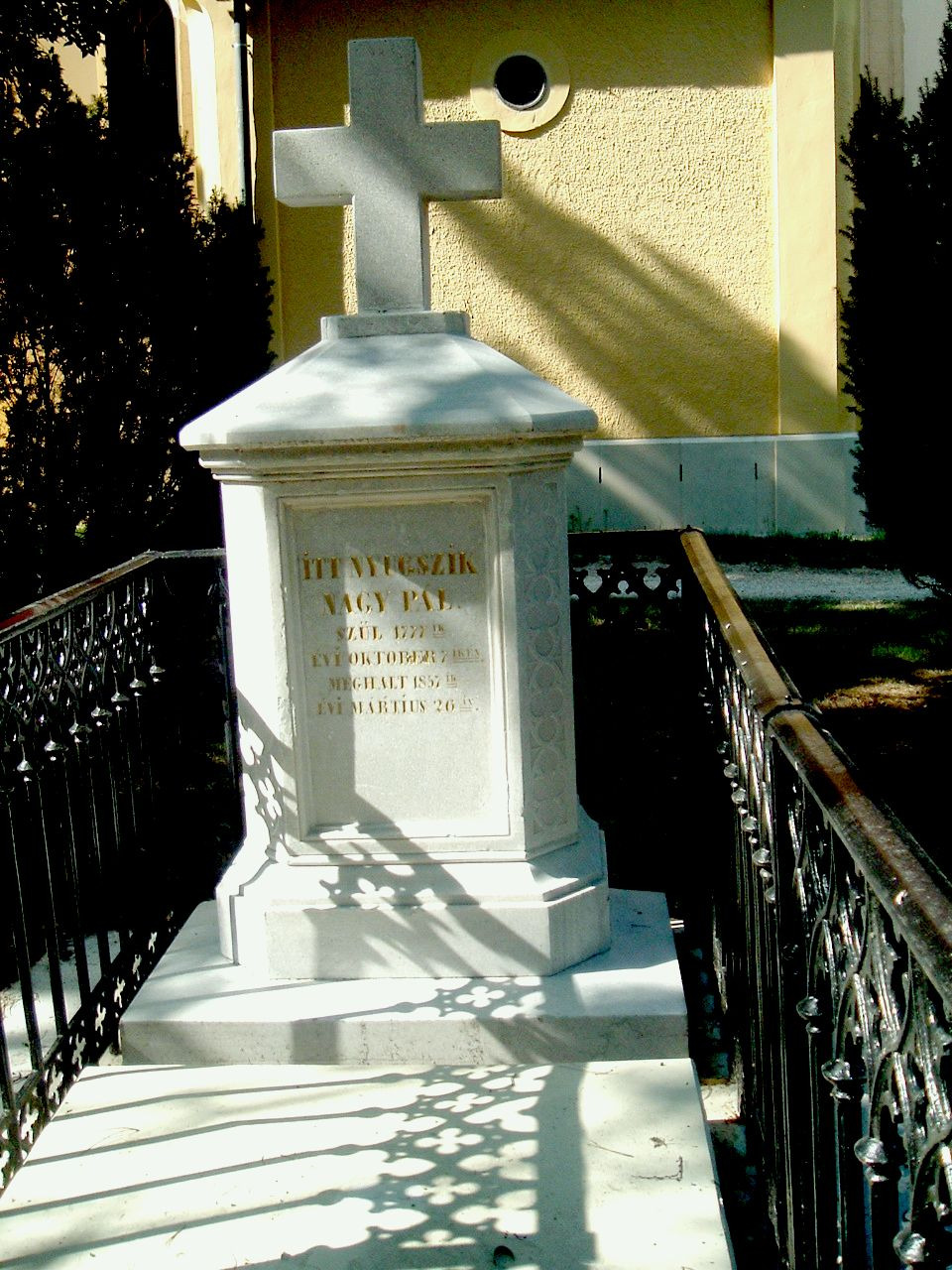
Tomb of Pál Felsőbüki Nagy in the town's cemetery

== Twin towns – sister cities ==
Bük is twinned with:

- Illingen, Germany
- Törökbálint, Hungary

== Sport ==
- Büki TK

== Gallery ==
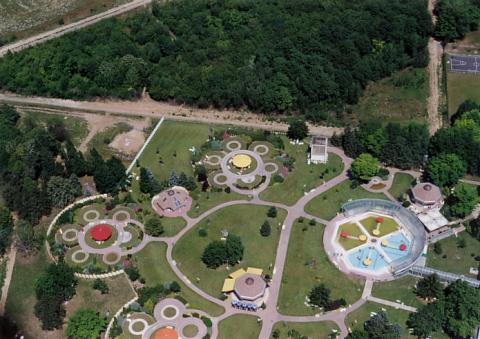

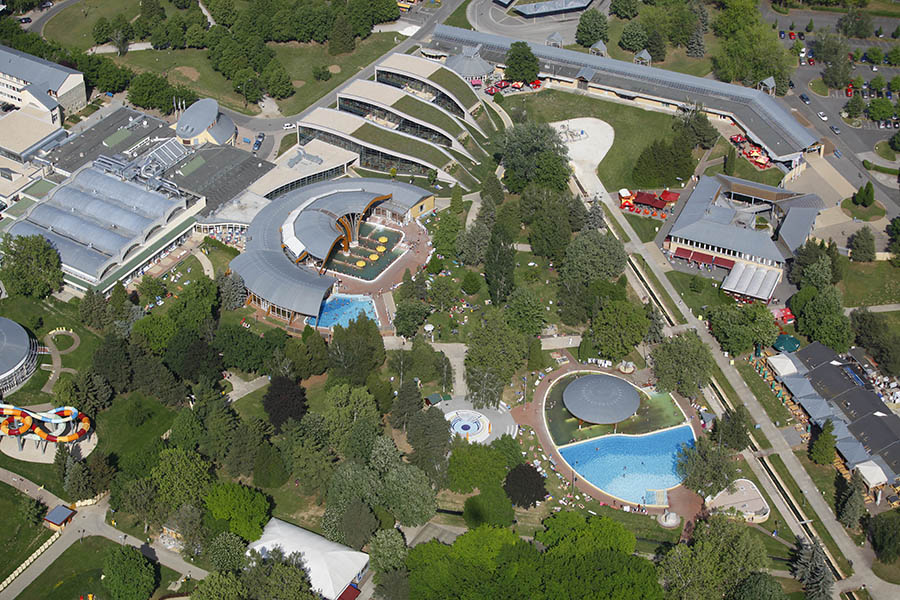

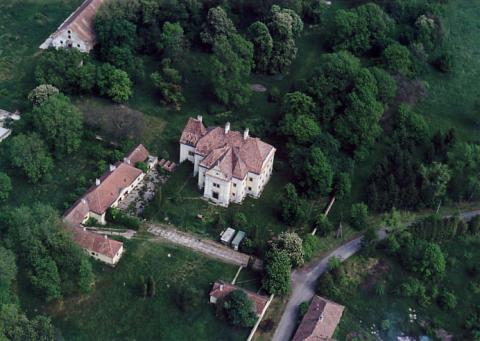
