= Halastó =

- Location of Halastó in Hungary
- Coordinates: 46.95115°N 16.68540°E
- Country: Hungary
- Region: Western Transdanubia
- County: Vas
- Subregion: Körmendi
- Rank: Village

Area
  - Total: 5.65 km^{2} (2.18 sq mi)

Population (1 January 2008)
  - Total: 108
  - Density: 19.1/km^{2} (49.5/sq mi)
- Time zone: UTC+1 (CET)
  - Summer (DST): UTC+2 (CEST)
- Postal code: 9814
- Area code: +36 94
- KSH code: 29452
- Website: https://halasto.asp.lgov.hu/

Halastó is a village in Hungary, Western Transdanubia, Vas county, Körmendi subregion. As of 2008, the population of the village is 108 people. Area of the village is 5.65 km².
