= Imre Madách =

Hungarian writer (1823–1864)

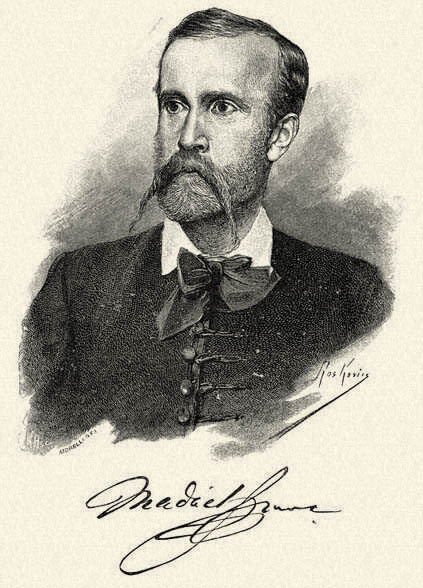
- Born: January 20, 1823; Alsósztregova, Austrian Empire (now Dolná Strehová, Slovakia)
- Died: October 5, 1864 (aged 41); Alsósztregova, Austrian Empire
- Occupations: Poet, writer, lawyer, politician
- Spouse: Erzsébet Fráter (m. 1845; div. 1854)
- Children: Aladár, Jolán, Anna Borbála
- Relatives: János Rimay (ancestor/relative)
- Writing career
- Period: 19th-century Hungarian literature / Romanticism
- Notable work: The Tragedy of Man (1862)
- Notable awards: Full Member of the Kisfaludy Society; Corresponding Member of the Hungarian Academy of Sciences

Imre Madách of Sztregova and Kiskelecsény (Alsósztregova, January 20, 1823 – Alsósztregova, October 5, 1864) was a prominent Hungarian poet, writer, lawyer, politician, full member of the Kisfaludy Society, and corresponding member of the Hungarian Academy of Sciences. He is widely recognized as one of the most distinguished and influential figures in Hungarian literature and dramatic poetry, best remembered for his universal philosophical masterpiece, The Tragedy of Man (Az ember tragédiája).

== Life and Background ==
Imre Madách Sr. and Anna Majthényi

=== Ancestry and Family Background ===
Imre Madách was born into an ancient, respected Hungarian middle-noble family. He could trace his ancestry back to the 13th century, connecting his lineage to Radun, who lived during the reign of King Andrew II. The family received donation letters and estates in Zólyom County from King Béla IV in 1250. The Madách family held Alsósztregova (Dolná Strehová) from 1430 onward, giving rise to the "Sztregova branch."

Among his ancestors were notable historical figures, military heroes, and poets, such as Gáspár Madách, a learned poet of the early 17th century, and his uncle, János Rimay, one of the most prominent Hungarian poets of the generation following Bálint Balassi.

His grandfather, Sándor Madách (1756–1814), was a renowned freemason, one of the most successful lawyers of his time, and the chief prosecutor of Nógrád County, who also defended the accused in the Martinovics conspiracy trial. His father, Imre Madách Sr. (1781–1834), lived a relatively retired life as a royal chamberlain managing the estate in Alsósztregova. His mother was Anna Majthényi of Keselőkő (1789–1885), who gave birth to nine children, five of whom survived to adulthood (Imre, Károly, Pál, Anna, and Mária).

== Childhood and Early Education ==
Madách spent his childhood in his parents' manor in Alsósztregova under the supervision of private tutors (József Kovács and Ernő Osztermann). Due to a lack of companionship outside the family circle, he grew up introverted, shy, and solitary. He was physically frail and suffered from poor health throughout his life, battling heart conditions, tuberculosis, and gout.

He completed his education privately, taking his examinations at the Piarist Gymnasium in Vác between 1830 and 1837. The death of his father on January 3, 1834, deeply traumatized him, turning him increasingly toward books and self-education. He acquired profound, autodidactic knowledge, immersing himself in classical and modern literature as well as philosophy. At the age of fifteen, alongside his younger brother Pál, he launched a handwritten weekly journal titled Litteraturai Kevercs (Literary Mixture), featuring short essays and informational articles for his family.

== Youth and University Years ==
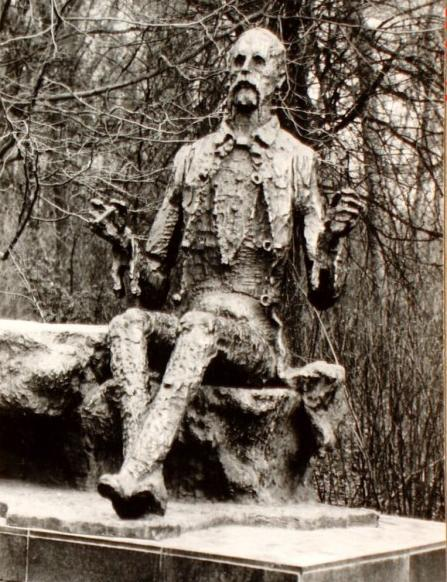
Statue of Imre Madách on Margaret Island, Budapest

In the autumn of 1837, Madách entered the University of Pest, studying philosophy for the first years and later law. Among his fellow students were future prominent political figures such as Gyula Andrássy and Menyhért Lónyay. He kept abreast of contemporary journals, read the works of Hungary’s finest poets, and subscribed to the reform-era journal Athenaeum.

Despite recurring illnesses, he edited another handwritten student paper (Mixtura), learned swimming, fencing, painting, piano, and wood-turning, and actively participated in university social events. He also became acquainted with Young Hungary, the radical youth movement of the period. His first romantic inspiration came from Etelka Lónyay, the sister of a fellow student, who inspired his early poems.

His first volume of poetry, containing 26 poems titled Lantvirágok (Lute Flowers), was published in Pest in 1840 at his mother's expense and dedicated to her.

Madách completed his legal training under the guidance of lawyer László Bory after his family had to liquidate their Pest household due to financial and staffing issues. He passed his bar examinations in the autumn of 1841 and completed his mandatory legal practice in Balassagyarmat, becoming an official attorney in December 1842. In 1843, he entered public service as an honorary sub-notary for Nógrád County. His closest friend, Pál Szontágh, introduced him to active social life, which helped temper his melancholic worldview with humor.

In March 1845, he became engaged to Erzsébet Fráter (the niece of his former principal, Nógrád County Deputy Lieutenant Pál Fráter). They married on July 20, 1845, in Csécse. Unfortunately, the marriage was severely strained by the persistent hostility between Madách’s mother and his young wife. The constant domestic friction drove Madách to seek refuge in his writing. The couple settled on their estate in Csesztve, where children were born to them (though their first son, Imre, died in infancy, followed by Aladár, Jolán, and Anna Borbála).

== The 1848–1849 Revolution and War of Independence ==
Portrait of Imre Madách by Ignác Roskovics (1889)

During the reform era, Madách aligned with the centralist political faction, anonymously publishing articles in the Pesti Hírlap. In 1848, as an empowered committee member of Nógrád County, he actively organized administrative duties and served as a chief provisioning commissioner. Due to his severe heart condition and fragile health, he could not take up active military service in the Hungarian army, but he contributed heavily to local recruitment and the organization of the National Guard.

The defeat of the 1848–1849 Revolution brought immense personal tragedy to the Madách family:

- Family Tragedies: In August 1849, his sister Mária, her 15-year-old son, and her second husband (Major Károly Balogh) were brutally murdered by Romanian peasants in Transylvania (Marosszlatina). His brother Pál, who served as a courier alongside Lajos Kossuth, contracted pneumonia from active service and died in Alsósztregova in October 1849.
- Imprisonment: Because he sheltered retreating freedom fighters and fugitives (such as János Rákóczy, Kossuth's secretary) on his estate, Madách was arrested in August 1852. He spent nearly a year in investigative detention, first in the water barracks of Bratislava (Pozsony) and later in the New Building (Újépület) in Pest.

It was during his imprisonment—scratching verses onto his wooden table with a piece of chalk—that he began drafting the earliest conceptual seeds of The Tragedy of Man (initially titled Lucifer). Released in May 1853 due to a lack of evidence, he remained under police surveillance for months. Meanwhile, his marriage completely disintegrated due to his wife's infidelity; a formal divorce agreement was signed in July 1854. Broken in spirit and health, Madách retreated to live near his mother in Alsósztregova, dedicating his remaining energy to intense historical and philosophical studies.

== Literary Career and Maturity ==
=== The Path to The Tragedy of Man ===
During the mid-1850s, Madách immersed himself in writing political satires (A civilizátor / The Civilizer, mocking the absolutist Bach regime) and historical dramas (Mária királyné, II. Lajos).

Between February 1859 and March 1860, he completed his magnum opus, The Tragedy of Man (Az ember tragédiája). Upon finishing it, he sent the manuscript to János Arany, the preeminent poet and literary critic of the era. Arany received the work with profound admiration in September 1861, offering editorial assistance on minor stylistic and metrical details.

The Tragedy of Man was published in January 1862 by the Kisfaludy Society. It achieved an immediate, sensational triumph in Hungarian cultural life. Capitalizing on this literary breakthrough, the Kisfaludy Society elected him a full member in January 1862, followed by his election as a corresponding member of the Hungarian Academy of Sciences in January 1863.

== Final Years and Public Life ==
In 1861, during the brief parliamentary restoration, Madách was elected as a member of parliament representing the Balassagyarmat constituency, aligning with the Resolution Party (Határozati Párt). He made significant parliamentary speeches, particularly regarding minority rights.

His creative output peaked in his final years: he completed his drama Moses (Mózes), wrote short stories for Arany’s journal Koszorú, and began his final, unfinished dramatic poem, Tündérálom (Fairy Dream). However, his chronic heart condition worsened rapidly. After dictating his final will to Pál Szontagh on October 4, 1864, Imre Madách passed away in the early hours of October 5, 1864, at Alsósztregova. He was laid to rest on October 7 in the family crypt at Alsósztregova.

== Major Works ==
The Tragedy of Man (Az ember tragédiája, 1859–1860, published 1862): A towering philosophical drama of universal significance. Through the framework of the Lord, Lucifer, and Adam, it depicts the historical trajectory of humanity across major epochs (Ancient Egypt, Athens, Rome, Byzantium, Venice, Prague under Kepler, the French Revolution, a London phalanstery, outer space, and an ice-age Eskimo society). It explores eternal existential questions regarding the meaning of history, progress, free will, and faith. Its famous closing line—“Mondottam ember: Küzdj, és bízva bízzál!” (“Man, I have said: Struggle, and trust, and hope!”)—is one of the most iconic quotations in Hungarian culture.

Historical Dramas: Csák végnapjai (The Last Days of Csák, 1843), Commodus (1843), Mária királyné (Queen Mary, 1855), Mózes (Moses, 1860–1861).

Satires: A civilizátor (The Civilizer, 1859).

Lyrical Poetry: His early collection Lantvirágok (Lute Flowers, 1840) alongside numerous mature philosophical lyrics.

== Legacy and Remembrance ==
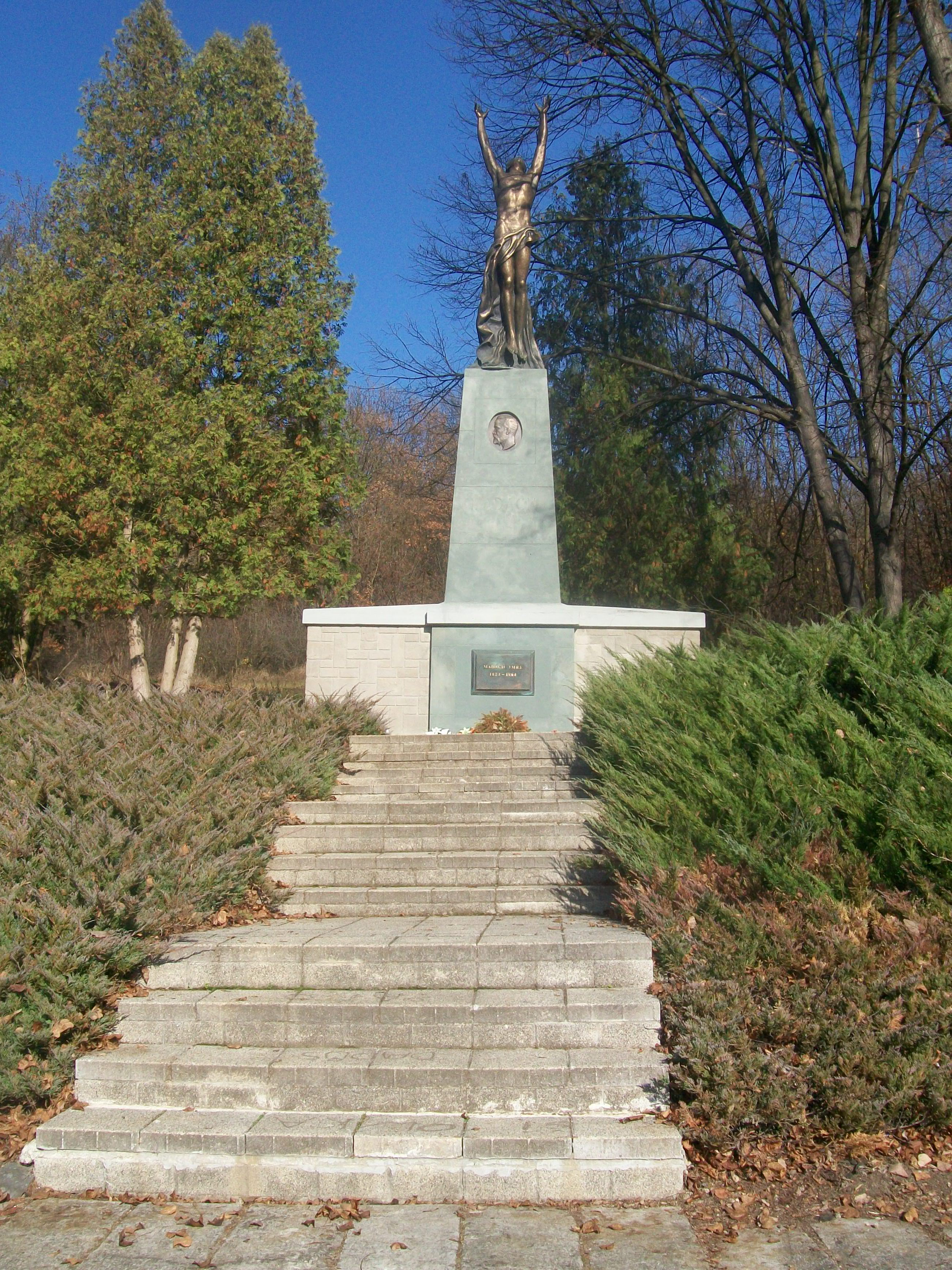
- Tomb with a monument of the writer Imre Madách
  Tributes: János Arany wrote an influential obituary in Koszorú, and Károly Bérczy delivered a commemorative speech at the Kisfaludy Society.
- Memorials and Statues: His gravesite and a memorial park featuring a sculpture by Alajos Rigele are located in Alsósztregova. Statues and busts stand in Budapest (National Theatre), Balassagyarmat (bronze full-figure statue), and Szeged.
- Institutions: The Madách Theatre in Budapest, numerous streets and squares across Hungary, and the Madách Imre City Library in Balassagyarmat bear his name.
- Astronomy: The main-belt asteroid 156580 Madách, discovered in 2022, was named in his honor.
