= Körmendy =

Körmendy in the Hungarian language, due to its form and implied meaning, is understood to be a family name. Literally it means: a person or family of or originating or associated with the place called Körmend, now one of the smaller townships in Western Hungary, near the Austrian border.

It is evident in some public records that the same family name may have been spelled "Körmendi" as compared to "Körmendy". It is generally understood in the Hungarian tradition that the use of the form "Körmendy" is an entitlement of some sort due to the formerly official title of nobility, received as granted in a traditional European meaning and process. The "Körmendi" name, form or usage, may mean in some cases, simply a spelling variation due to whatever reasons, but in some other cases "Körmendi" may be just an adopted name, not entitled to the "Körmendy" form of spelling.

There seem to exist many people in the world with these family names, however to this writer at this point it may be highly speculative to guess how many of these may be related at any distance, or whether there are one or more greater families covered by all these names. On the other hand, as an example, this writer has information of a document and public record granting the nobility title to a "Körmendy Márton" and his descendants (and the same to a companion by a different name) by "King Ferdinánd I" of Hungary, in the year 1549. This above cited record also refers to an official transcript of another record of the same subject, originating in "Szentmarja" of Bács Vármegye, formerly part of the Hungarian Kingdom, (now called Szabadka in Hungarian, and is now part of modern Serbia). This later transcript was sent to the Hungarian National Museum and is deposited under "Aldányi Antal, LXI 1549 január 5."

The above cited granting of nobility to said "Körmendy Márton" and his descendants is due to, according to the contents of the cited document(s), a certain incident of his heroic behavior during the Hungarian defensive wars against the Turkish invaders. The said heroic act occurred in a battle at the Hungarian town Győr, rescuing some Christians from the Turks. Along with the title of nobility this "Körmendy Márton" and his descendants were granted the right to use a certain coat of arms, described in detail within the above said letter of grant of nobility (nemeslevél in Hungarian).

These records at least provide a glimpse into the background and history connected with the name(s) Körmendy

== People ==
- John Kormendy, American astronomer
