= Győrvár =

- Village
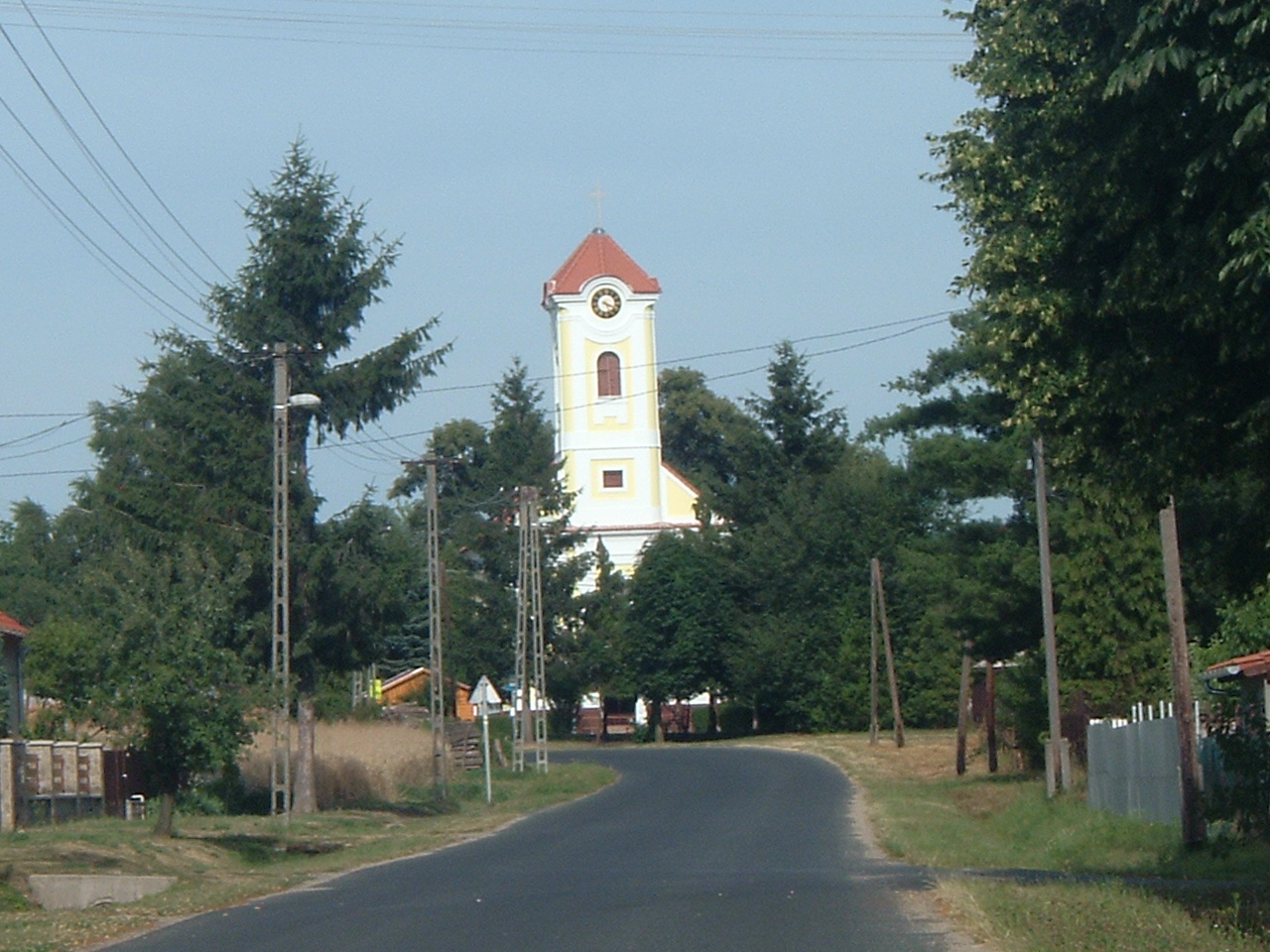

- Flag Coat of arms

- Location of Győrvár
- Coordinates: 46°59′0.31″N 16°50′22.99″E
- Country: Hungary
- Region: Western Transdanubia
- County: Vas
- District: Vasvár

Area
  - Total: 16.59 km^{2} (6.41 sq mi)

Population (1 January 2025)
  - Total: 601
  - Density: 36.2/km^{2} (93.8/sq mi)
- Time zone: UTC+1 (CET)
  - Summer (DST): UTC+2 (CEST)
- Postal code: 9821
- Area code: (+36) 94
- Website: www.gyorvar.hu

Győrvár is a village in Vas county, Hungary.
