= Csipkerek =

- Village
- Flag Coat of arms

- Location of Csipkerek
- Coordinates: 47.07676°N 16.93772°E
- Country: Hungary
- Region: Western Transdanubia
- County: Vas
- District: Vasvár

Area
  - Total: 13.13 km^{2} (5.07 sq mi)

Population (1 January 2025)
  - Total: 388
  - Density: 29.6/km^{2} (76.5/sq mi)
- Time zone: UTC+1 (CET)
  - Summer (DST): UTC+2 (CEST)
- Postal code: 9836
- Area code: (+36) 94
- Website: www.csipkerek.eoldal.hu

Csipkerek is a village in Vas County, Hungary.
