= Magyarszecsőd =

Village in Western Transdanubia, Hungary

- Coat of arms

- Location of Magyarszecsőd in Hungary
- Coordinates: 47°1′57.04″N 16°38′43.84″E
- Country: Hungary
- Region: Western Transdanubia
- County: Vas
- Subregion: Körmendi
- Rank: Village

Area
  - Total: 11.26 km^{2} (4.35 sq mi)
- Time zone: UTC+1 (CET)
  - Summer (DST): UTC+2 (CEST)
- Postal code: 9912
- Area code: +36 94
- Website: www.magyarszecsod.hu

Magyarszecsőd is a village in Vas county, Hungary.

== Sightseeing ==
Magyarszecsőd and Molnaszecsőd are sister villages. The older church, from the Árpád age, can be found in Magyarszecsőd. The beautiful southern doorway emphasizes the artistic view of the southern facade, while wall columns (pilasters) decorate all the walls around. It has a west tower, as at several Árpád age churches in Hungary.
