= Molnaszecsőd =

- Coat of arms

- Location of Molnaszecsőd in Hungary
- Coordinates: 47°2′44.92″N 16°40′36.59″E
- Country: Hungary
- Region: Western Transdanubia
- County: Vas
- Subregion: Körmendi
- Rank: Village

Area
  - Total: 11.69 km^{2} (4.51 sq mi)
- Time zone: UTC+1 (CET)
  - Summer (DST): UTC+2 (CEST)
- Postal code: 9912
- Area code: +36 94
- Website: https://molnaszecsod.asp.lgov.hu/

Molnaszecsőd is a village in Vas County, Hungary. The population in 2011 are 229 and 203, males and female respectively.
