= John Kormendy =

American astronomer

John Kormendy (born June 13, 1948; Graz, Austria), is an American astronomer, currently the Curtis T. Vaughn, Jr. Centennial Chair at University of Texas at Austin. He is known for the Kormendy relation found in the surface brightness profiles for elliptic galaxies.

== Honors ==
He has been awarded the Gold Medal of the Royal Astronomical Society of Canada (1970), the Muhlmann Prize of the Astronomical Society of the Pacific (1988), a Humboldt Research Award of the Alexander von Humboldt Foundation, Germany (2006), and External Membership in the Max-Planck-Institute for Extraterrestrial Physics in Garching-by-Munich, Germany (2012). In 2020, Kormendy was elected to the National Academy of Sciences.
