= Sárfimizdó =

- Coat of arms

- Location of Sárfimizdó in Hungary
- Coordinates: 46.94355°N 16.71673°E
- Country: Hungary
- Region: Western Transdanubia
- County: Vas
- Subregion: Vasvári
- Rank: Village

Area
  - Total: 7.46 km^{2} (2.88 sq mi)

Population (1 January 2008)
  - Total: 97
  - Density: 13/km^{2} (34/sq mi)
- Time zone: UTC+1 (CET)
  - Summer (DST): UTC+2 (CEST)
- Postal code: 9813
- Area code: +36 94
- KSH code: 09788
- Website: http://www.sarfimizdo.hu/

Sárfimizdó is a village in Vas county, Hungary.
