= Olaszfa =

- Coat of arms

- Location of Vas county in Hungary

- Location of Olaszfa
- Coordinates: 47.01185°N 16.88340°E
- Country: Hungary
- County: Vas

Area
  - Total: 16.54 km^{2} (6.39 sq mi)

Population (2004)
  - Total: 471
  - Density: 28.47/km^{2} (73.7/sq mi)
- Time zone: UTC+1 (CET)
  - Summer (DST): UTC+2 (CEST)
- Postal code: 9824
- Area code: 94

Olaszfa is a village in Vas county, Hungary. It was known historically as Oloszka, Ungarn Oedenburger Distrikt, Comitat Eisenberg in western Hungary near the border with Austria.
