= Dolná Strehová =

Dolná Strehová Alsósztregova
- Municipality
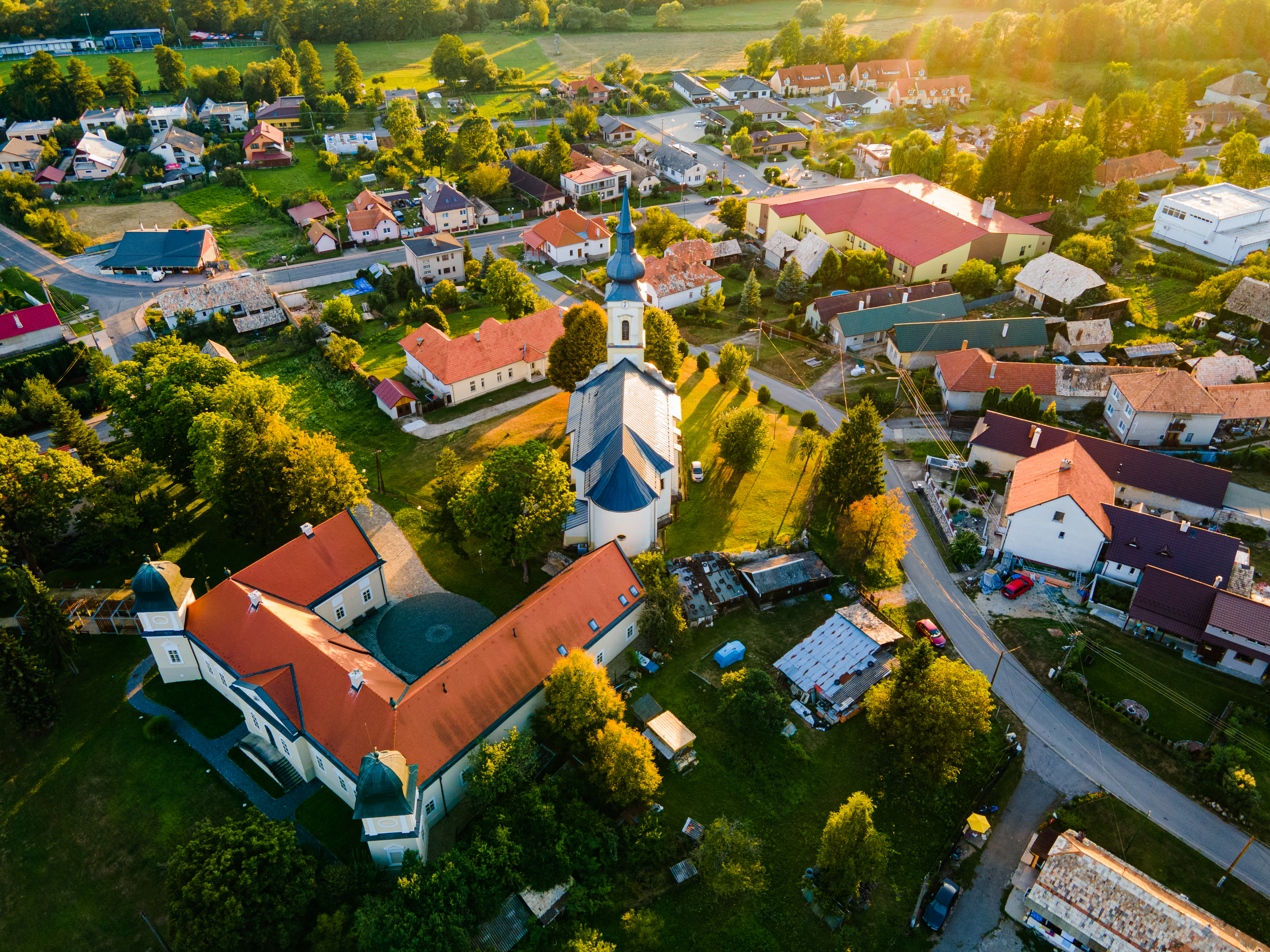

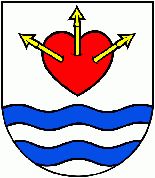
- Flag Coat of arms

- Location of Dolná Strehová in the Banská Bystrica Region Location of Dolná Strehová in Slovakia
- Coordinates: 48.25°N 19.50°E
- Country: Slovakia
- Region: Banská Bystrica Region
- District: Veľký Krtíš District
- First mentioned: 1251

Area
  - Total: 21.24 km^{2} (8.20 sq mi)
- Elevation: 239 m (784 ft)

Population (2025)
  - Total: 1,003
- Time zone: UTC+1 (CET)
  - Summer (DST): UTC+2 (CEST)
- Postal code: 991 02
- Area code: +421 47
- Vehicle registration plate (until 2022): VK
- Website: dolnastrehova.sk

Dolná Strehová (Hungarian: Alsósztregova) is a village and municipality in the Veľký Krtíš District of the Banská Bystrica Region of southern Slovakia.

== Etymology ==
The name comes from Slavic strъg-, strěg-: to watch, to guard. 1245 de villa Stregowa, 1250 Stregoa, 1310 de Strigua, 1349 poss. Stregoua, 1393 Ztregua, 1461 Stregwa, 1487 Ztrehowa, 1808 sk. Dolnj Střehowá, hu. Asló-Sztregova and sk. Hornj Střehowá, hu. Felső-Sztregova.

== Geography ==
The municipality lies at an altitude of 239 metres (784 ft) and covers an area of 21.24 km^{2} (8.20 sq mi) (2025).

== History ==
The village belonged to many feudatory families. In 1534 it passed to Léva town (today Levice, Slovakia). In the 18th century it belonged to the Esterházy family. In 1920, by the Treaty of Trianon, it became part of the newly formed Czechoslovakia. In 1938, by the First Vienna Award, it was returned to Hungary until the end of World War II, when it became part of Czechoslovakia again. Since 1993, it is part of Slovakia.

== Population ==
Population statistic (10 years)
Year	1995	2005	2015	2025
Count	1059	1018	1048	1003
Difference		−3.87%	+2.94%	−4.29%

Population statistic
Year	2024	2025
Count	1007	1003
Difference		−0.39%

It has a population of 1003 people (31 December 2025).

=== Ethnicity ===
Census 2021 (1+ %)
Ethnicity	Number	Fraction
Slovak	979	96.64%
Not found out	23	2.27%
Czech	15	1.48%
Total	1013	

In year 2021 was 1013 people by ethnicity 979 as Slovak, 23 as Not found out, 15 as Czech, 4 as Hungarian, 3 as Other, 2 as Romani, 1 as Ukrainian, 1 as Serbian and 1 as Russian.

Note on population: The difference values of population numbers in the table "Population statistic" and in the sections "Ethnicity" & "Religion" is caused by the use of various statistical methods.

=== Religion ===
Census 2021 (1+ %)
Religion	Number	Fraction
Roman Catholic Church	587	57.95%
None	191	18.85%
Evangelical Church	179	17.67%
Not found out	33	3.26%
Total	1013	

In year 2021 was 1013 people by religion 587 from Roman Catholic Church, 191 from None, 179 from Evangelical Church, 33 from Not found out, 9 from Ad hoc movements, 4 from Paganism and natural spirituality, 4 from Greek Catholic Church, 3 from Eastern Orthodox Church, 2 from Other and not ascertained christian church and 1 from Buddhism.

== Genealogical resources ==
The records for genealogical research are available at the state archive "Statny Archiv in Banska Bystrica, Slovakia"

- Roman Catholic church records (births/marriages/deaths): 1811-1899 (parish A)
- Lutheran church records (births/marriages/deaths): 1815-1897 (parish A)

== See also ==
- List of municipalities and towns in Slovakia
