= Döbörhegy =

- Location of Vas county in Hungary

- Location of Döbörhegy
- Coordinates: 46.99016°N 16.70518°E
- Country: Hungary
- County: Vas

Area
  - Total: 11.75 km^{2} (4.54 sq mi)

Population (2004)
  - Total: 202
  - Density: 17.19/km^{2} (44.5/sq mi)
- Time zone: UTC+1 (CET)
  - Summer (DST): UTC+2 (CEST)
- Postal code: 9914
- Area code: 94

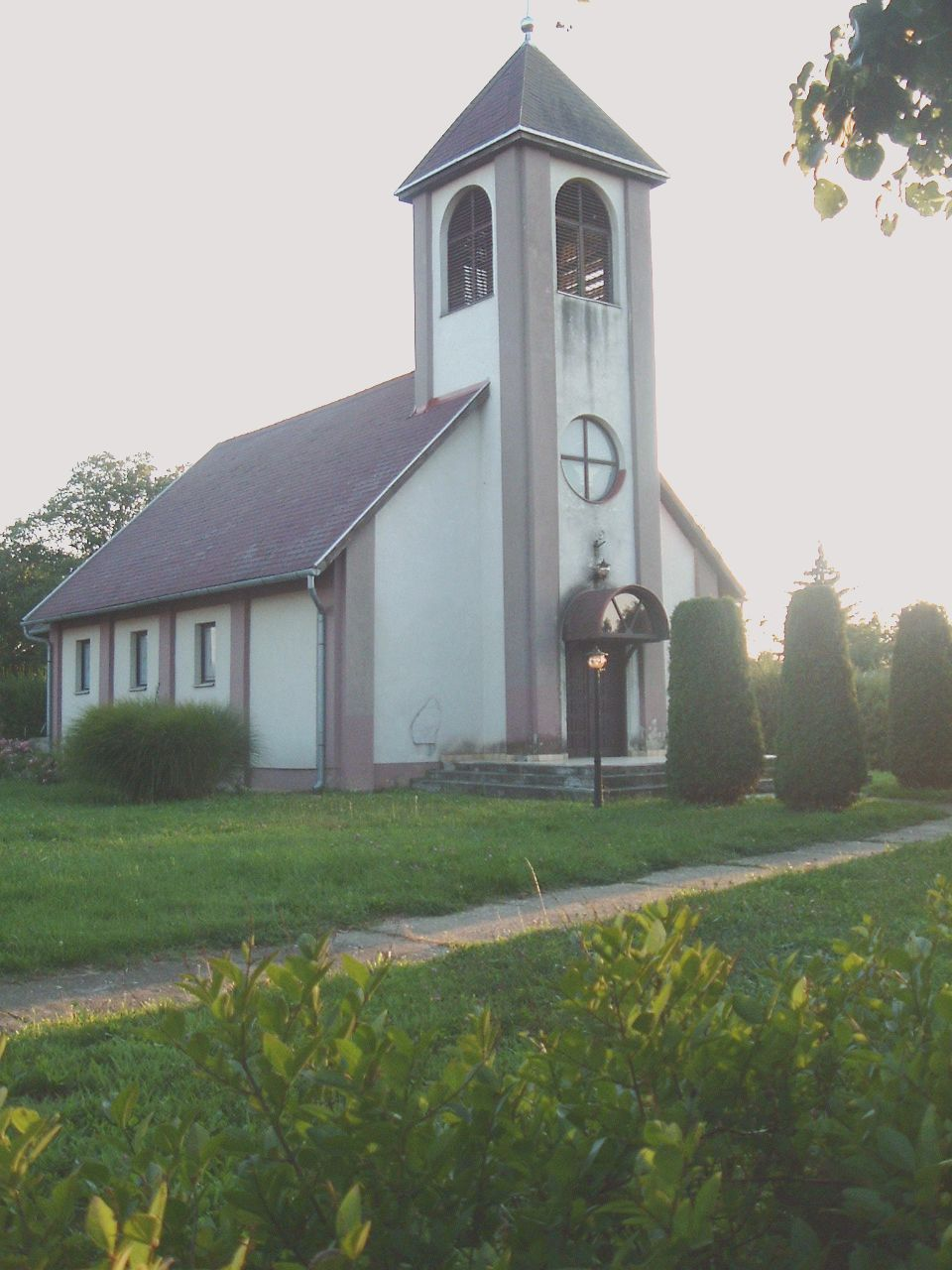

Döbörhegy is a village in Vas County, Hungary.
