= Petőmihályfa =

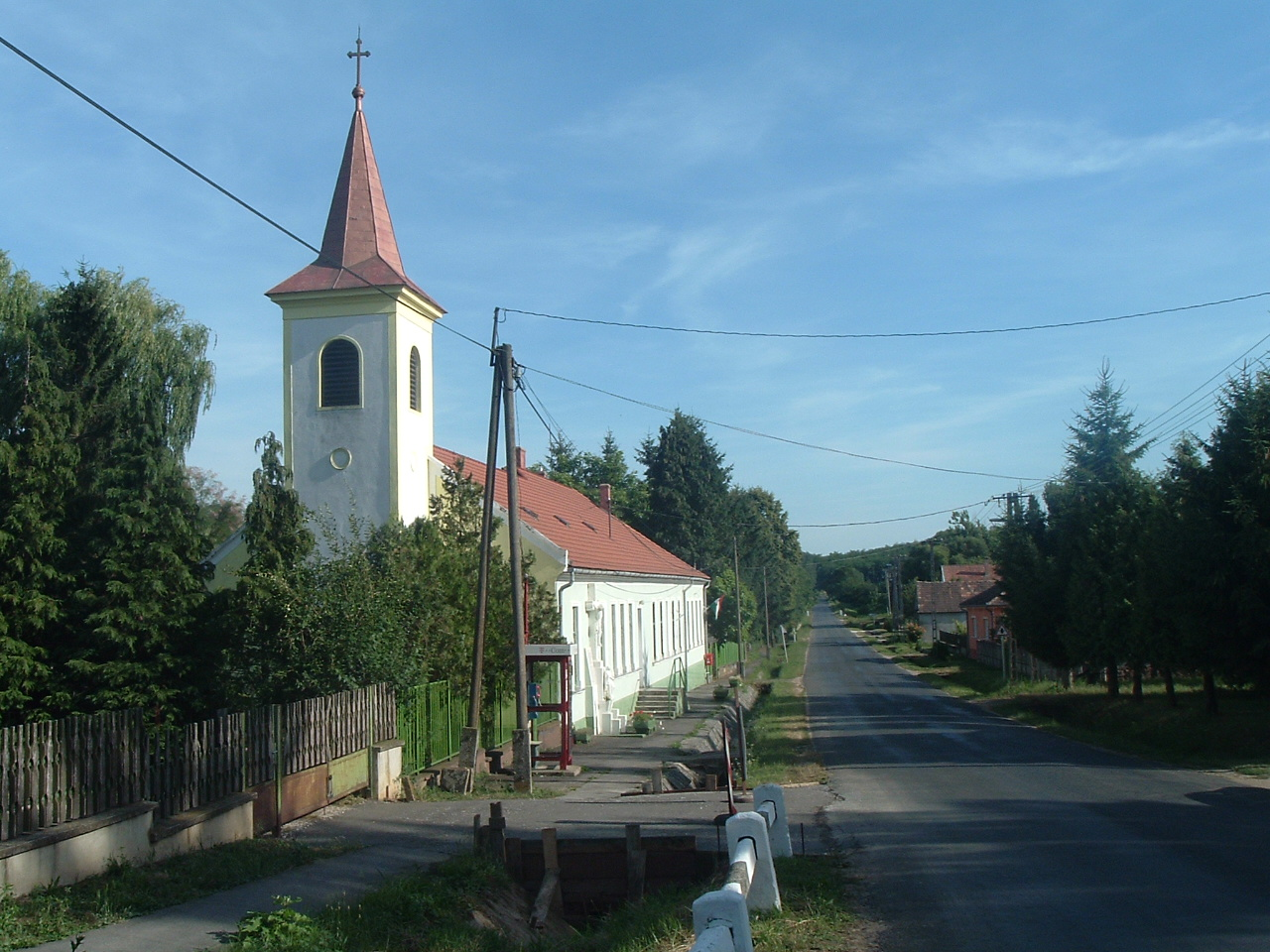
- Saint Michael’s Church, Petőmihályfa

- Location of Petőmihályfa in Hungary
- Coordinates: 46°58′51.10″N 16°47′11.08″E
- Country: Hungary
- Region: Western Transdanubia
- County: Vas
- Subregion: Vasvári
- Rank: Village

Area
  - Total: 9.95 km^{2} (3.84 sq mi)
- Time zone: UTC+1 (CET)
  - Summer (DST): UTC+2 (CEST)
- Postal code: 9826
- Area code: +36 94
- Website: http://petomihalyfa.hu

Petőmihályfa is a village in Vas county, Hungary.
