= Andrásfa =

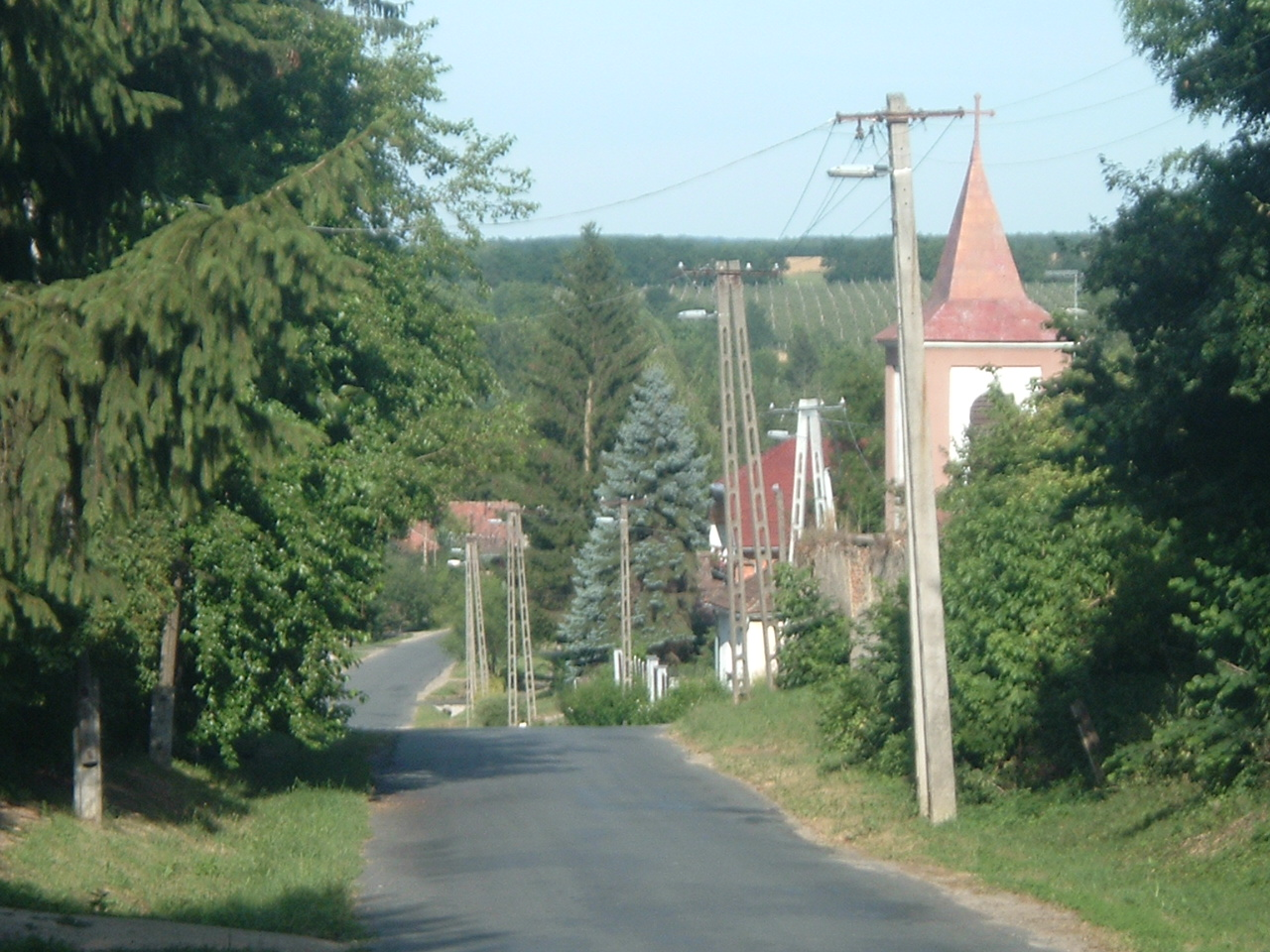

- Location of Vas county in Hungary

- Location of Andrásfa
- Coordinates: 46.96393°N 16.79535°E
- Country: Hungary
- County: Vas

Area
  - Total: 8.23 km^{2} (3.18 sq mi)

Population (2004)
  - Total: 287
  - Density: 34.87/km^{2} (90.3/sq mi)
- Time zone: UTC+1 (CET)
  - Summer (DST): UTC+2 (CEST)
- Postal code: 9811
- Area code: 94

Andrásfa is a village in the southeastern part of Körmend District in Vas County, Hungary. The western side of the village sits on a hillside while the eastern side lies on a flatland.
