= Vasvár =

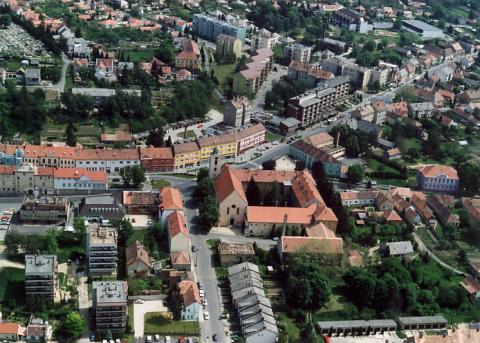
- Aerial photography of Vasvár

- Flag Coat of arms

- Location of Vas county in Hungary

- Location of Vasvár
- Coordinates: 47.04799°N 16.80389°E
- Country: Hungary
- County: Vas

Area
  - Total: 55.1 km^{2} (21.3 sq mi)

Population (2015)
  - Total: 4,266
  - Density: 77.4/km^{2} (201/sq mi)
- Time zone: UTC+1 (CET)
  - Summer (DST): UTC+2 (CEST)
- Postal code: 9800
- Area code: 94

Vasvár (German: Eisenburg, Slovene: Železnograd, Latin: (formerly) Castrum Ferrum), is a town in Vas County, Hungary. It was the county seat of Vas County.

== History ==
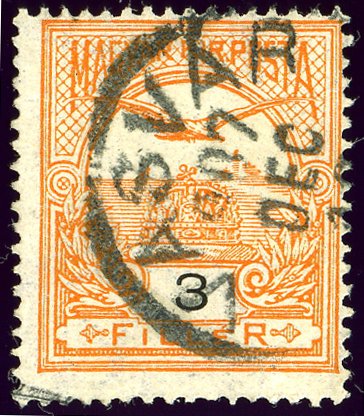
Vasvár in the Kingdom of Hungary in 1907

While the Ottomans occupied most of central Europe, the region north of lake Balaton remained in the Kingdom of Hungary (1538–1867) (captaincy between Balaton and Drava). The town was the head of the EISENBURG comitat near 1850. Until 1918, VASVÁR was part of the Austrian monarchy, province of Hungary; in Transleithania after the compromise of 1867 in the Kingdom of Hungary.

During World War II, Vasvár was captured on 31 March 1945 by Soviet troops of the 3rd Ukrainian Front in the course of the Nagykanizsa–Körmend Offensive.

== See also ==
- Peace of Vasvár
- Vasvári kistérség (hu)
