= Szombathely District =

Szombathely District Szombathelyi járás
- Districts of Hungary
- Coat of arms

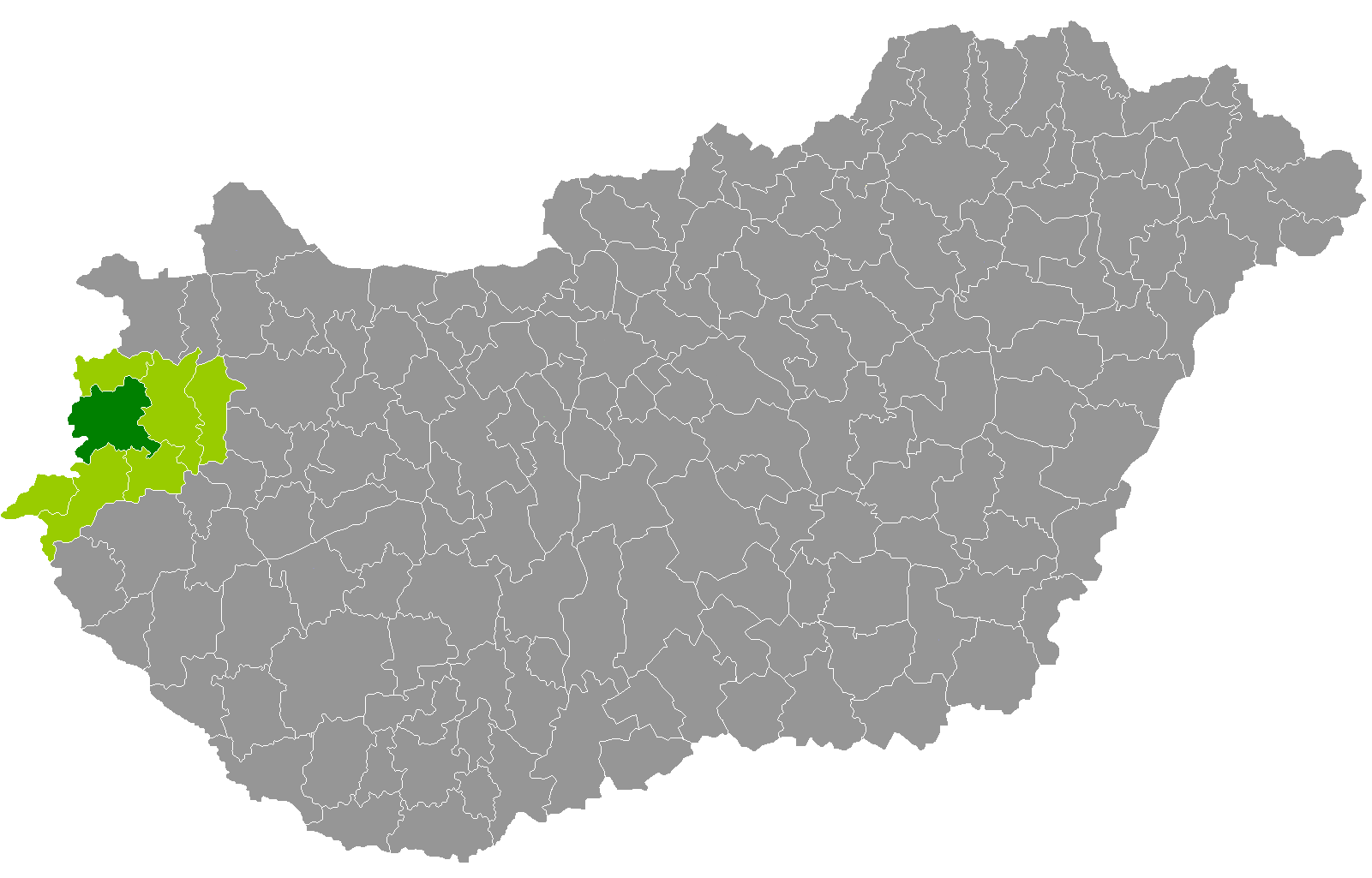
- Szombathely District within Hungary and Vas County.
- Coordinates: 47.23°N 16.62°E
- Country: Hungary
- County: Vas
- District seat: Szombathely

Area
  - Total: 646.36 km^{2} (249.56 sq mi)
  - Rank: 2nd in Vas

Population (2011 census)
  - Total: 112,320
  - Rank: 1st in Vas
  - Density: 174/km^{2} (450/sq mi)

Szombathely (Hungarian: Szombathelyi járás) is a district in central-western part of Vas County. Szombathely is also the name of the town where the district seat is found. The district is located in the Western Transdanubia Statistical Region.

== Geography ==
Szombathely District borders with Kőszeg District to the north, Sárvár District to the east, Vasvár District and Körmend District to the south, the Austrian state of Burgenland to the west. The number of the inhabited places in Szombathely District is 40.

== Municipalities ==
The district has 1 urban county, 1 town and 38 villages. (ordered by population, as of 1 January 2013)

- Acsád (585)
- Balogunyom (1,144)
- Bozzai (309)
- Bucsu (543)
- Csempeszkopács (285)
- Dozmat (225)
- Felsőcsatár (491)
- Gencsapáti (2,743)
- Gyanógeregye (151)
- Horvátlövő (198)
- Ják (2,603)
- Kisunyom (418)
- Meszlen (218)
- Nárai (1,233)
- Narda (464)
- Nemesbőd (612)
- Nemeskolta (351)
- Perenye (646)
- Pornóapáti (398)
- Rábatöttös (207)
- Rum (1,166)
- Salköveskút (473)
- Sé (1,352)
- Sorkifalud (652)
- Sorkikápolna (246)
- Sorokpolány (836)
- Söpte (763)
- Szentpéterfa (1,006)
- **Szombathely** (77,547) – district and county seat
- Tanakajd (715)
- Táplánszentkereszt (2,570)
- Torony (1,942)
- Vasasszonyfa (373)
- Vaskeresztes (373)
- Vassurány (824)
- Vasszécseny (1,374)
- Vasszilvágy (376)
- Vát (671)
- **Vép** (3,323)
- Zsennye (98)

The bolded municipalities are cities.

== Demographics ==
Religion in Szombathely District (2011 census)
1. Catholic Church (56.7%)
2. Greek Catholicism (0.10%)
3. Lutheranism (2.60%)
4. Calvinism (1.90%)
5. Other religions (1.00%)
6. Non-religious (7.31%)
7. Atheists (1.00%)
8. Undeclared (29.4%)

In 2011, it had a population of 112,320 and the population density was 174/km².

Year	County population	Change
2011	112,320	n/a

=== Ethnicity ===
Besides the Hungarian majority, the main minorities are the German (approx. 2,500), Croat (2,000), Roma (850), Romanian (200) and Slovene (150).

Total population (2011 census): 112,320
Ethnic groups (2011 census): Identified themselves: 100,855 persons:

- Hungarians: 94,314 (93.52%)
- Germans: 2,467 (2.45%)
- Croats: 1,997 (1.98%)
- Others and indefinable: 2,077 (2.06%)

Approx. 11,500 persons in Szombathely District did not declare their ethnic group at the 2011 census.

=== Religion ===
Religious adherence in the county according to 2011 census:

- Catholic – 63,800 (Roman Catholic – 63,623; Greek Catholic – 144);
- Evangelical – 2,899;
- Reformed – 2,158;
- other religions – 1,117;
- Non-religious – 8,213;
- Atheism – 1,149;
- Undeclared – 32,984.

== See also ==
- List of cities and towns in Hungary
