= List of populated places in Hungary (V) =

This is a list of cities, towns and villages of Hungary

KEY: T = Town ; V = Village

Name	Rank	County	District	Population	Post code
Vác	T	Pest	Váci	33,518	2600
Vácduka	V	Pest	Váci	1,019	2167
Vácegres	V	Pest	Veresegyházi	898	2184
Váchartyán	V	Pest	Váci	1,758	2164
Váckisújfalu	V	Pest	Veresegyházi	478	2185
Vácrátót	V	Pest	Veresegyházi	1,691	2163
Vácszentlászló	V	Pest	Gödölloi	2,013	2115
Vadna	V	Borsod-Abaúj-Zemplén	Kazincbarcikai	601	3636
Vadosfa	V	Gyor-Moson-Sopron	Kapuvári	84	9346
Vág	V	Gyor-Moson-Sopron	Csornai	566	9327
Vágáshuta	V	Borsod-Abaúj-Zemplén	Sátoraljaújhelyi	114	3992
Vaja	V	Szabolcs-Szatmár-Bereg	Mátészalkai	3,798	4562
Vajdácska	V	Borsod-Abaúj-Zemplén	Sárospataki	1,401	3961
Vajszló	V	Baranya	Sellyei	1,879	7838
Vajta	V	Fejér	Sárbogárdi	963	7041
Vál	V	Fejér	Bicskei	2,390	2473
Valkó	V	Pest	Gödölloi	2,424	2114
Valkonya	V	Zala	Letenyei	64	8885
Vállaj	V	Szabolcs-Szatmár-Bereg	Mátészalkai	1,038	4351
Vállus	V	Zala	Keszthely–Hévízi	147	8316
Vámosatya	V	Szabolcs-Szatmár-Bereg	Vásárosnaményi	586	4936
Vámoscsalád	V	Tolna	Sárvári	373	9665
Vámosgyörk	V	Heves	Gyöngyösi	2,182	3291
Vámosmikola	V	Pest	Szobi	1,684	2635
Vámosoroszi	V	Szabolcs-Szatmár-Bereg	Fehérgyarmati	547	4966
Vámospércs	T	Hajdú-Bihar	Hajdúhadházi	5,477	4287
Vámosújfalu	V	Borsod-Abaúj-Zemplén	Sárospataki	930	3941
Vámosszabadi	V	Gyor-Moson-Sopron	Gyori	1,305	9061
Váncsod	V	Hajdú-Bihar	Berettyóújfalui	1,350	4119
Vanyarc	V	Nógrád	Pásztói	1,402	2688
Vanyola	V	Veszprém	Pápai	620	8552
Várad	V	Baranya	Szigetvári	143	7973
Váralja	V	Tolna	Bonyhádi	1,033	7354
Varászló	V	Somogy	Marcali	181	8723
Váraszó	V	Heves	Pétervásárai	2,705	3254
Várbalog	V	Gyor-Moson-Sopron	Mosonmagyaróvári	464	9243
Varbó	V	Borsod-Abaúj-Zemplén	Miskolci	1,156	3778
Varbóc	V	Borsod-Abaúj-Zemplén	Edelényi	64	3756
Várda	V	Somogy	Kaposvári	557	7442
Várdomb	V	Tolna	Szekszárdi	1,261	7146
Várfölde	V	Zala	Letenyei	233	8891
Varga	V	Baranya	Sásdi	138	7370
Várgesztes	V	Komárom-Esztergom	Tatabányai	504	2824
Várkeszo	V	Veszprém	Pápai	229	8523
Várong	V	Tolna	Dombóvári	197	7214
Városföld	V	Bács-Kiskun	Kecskeméti	2,250	6033
Városlod	V	Veszprém	Ajkai	1,464	8445
Várpalota	T	Veszprém	Várpalotai	21,523	8100
Varsád	V	Tolna	Tamási	439	7067
Varsány	V	Nógrád	Szécsényi	1,759	3178
Várvölgy	V	Zala	Keszthely–Hévízi	1,127	8316
Vasad	V	Pest	Monori	1,606	2211
Vasalja	V	Tolna	Körmendi	341	9921
Vásárosbéc	V	Baranya	Szigetvári	219	7926
Vásárosdombó	V	Baranya	Sásdi	1,165	7362
Vásárosfalu	V	Gyor-Moson-Sopron	Kapuvári	162	9343
Vásárosmiske	V	Tolna	Sárvári	390	9552
Vásárosnamény	T	Szabolcs-Szatmár-Bereg	Vásárosnaményi	9,439	4800
Vasasszonyfa	V	Tolna	Szombathelyi	387	9744
Vasboldogasszony	V	Zala	Zalaegerszegi	634	8914
Vasegerszeg	V	Tolna	Sárvári	400	9661
Vashosszúfalu	V	Tolna	Sárvári	452	9674
Vaskeresztes	V	Tolna	Szombathelyi	356	9795
Vaskút	V	Bács-Kiskun	Bajai	3,599	6521
Vasmegyer	V	Szabolcs-Szatmár-Bereg	Ibrány–Nagyhalászi	1,650	4502
Vaspör	V	Zala	Zalaegerszegi	408	8998
Vassurány	V	Tolna	Szombathelyi	885	9741
Vasvár	T	Tolna	Vasvári	4,677	9800
Vaszar	V	Veszprém	Pápai	1,624	8542
Vászoly	V	Veszprém	Balatonfüredi	190	8245
Vasszécseny	V	Tolna	Szombathelyi	1,403	9763
Vasszentmihály	V	Tolna	Szentgotthárdi	379	9953
Vasszilvágy	V	Tolna	Szombathelyi	407	9747
Vát	V	Tolna	Szombathelyi	688	9748
Vatta	V	Borsod-Abaúj-Zemplén	Mezokövesdi	976	3431
Vázsnok	V	Baranya	Sásdi	144	7370
Vécs	V	Heves	Gyöngyösi	2,566	3265
Vecsés	T	Pest	Gyáli	18,697	2220
Végegyháza	V	Békés	Mezokovácsházi	1,600	5811
Vejti	V	Baranya	Sellyei	202	7838
Vékény	V	Baranya	Komlói	150	7333
Vekerd	V	Hajdú-Bihar	Berettyóújfalui	154	4143
Velem	V	Tolna	Koszegi	342	9726
Velemér	V	Tolna	Oriszentpéteri	102	9946
Velence	V	Fejér	Gárdonyi	4,636	2481
Velény	V	Baranya	Szentlorinci	176	7951
Véménd	V	Baranya	Mohácsi	1,674	7726
Vének	V	Gyor-Moson-Sopron	Gyori	169	9062
Vép	T	Vas	Szombathelyi	3,546	9751
Vereb	V	Fejér	Székesfehérvári	796	2477
Veresegyház	T	Pest	Veresegyházi	11,348	2112
Veroce	V	Pest	Váci	3,068	2621
Verpelét	V	Heves	Füzesabonyi	5,318	3351
Verseg	V	Pest	Aszódi	1,430	2174
Versend	V	Baranya	Mohácsi	991	7752
Vértesacsa	V	Fejér	Bicskei	1,771	8089
Vértesboglár	V	Fejér	Bicskei	955	8085
Vérteskethely	V	Komárom-Esztergom	Kisbéri	610	2859
Vértessomló	V	Komárom-Esztergom	Tatabányai	1,336	2823
Vértestolna	V	Komárom-Esztergom	Tatai	524	2833
Vértesszolos	V	Komárom-Esztergom	Tatabányai	2,740	2837
Vése	V	Somogy	Marcali	818	8721
Veszkény	V	Gyor-Moson-Sopron	Kapuvári	905	9352
Veszprém	county seat	Veszprém	Veszprémi	61,719	8200
Veszprémfajsz	V	Veszprém	Veszprémi	269	8248
Veszprémgalsa	V	Veszprém	Sümegi	299	8475
Veszprémvarsány	V	Gyor-Moson-Sopron	Pannonhalmi	1,022	8438
Vészto	T	Békés	Szeghalmi	7,623	5530
Vezseny	V	Jász-Nagykun-Szolnok	Szolnoki	679	5093
Vid	V	Veszprém	Ajkai	119	8484
Vigántpetend	V	Veszprém	Tapolcai	229	8294
Villány	T	Baranya	Siklósi	2,787	7773
Villánykövesd	V	Baranya	Siklósi	322	7772
Vilmány	V	Borsod-Abaúj-Zemplén	Abaúj–Hegyközi	1,420	3891
Vilonya	V	Veszprém	Veszprémi	656	8194
Vilyvitány	V	Borsod-Abaúj-Zemplén	Sátoraljaújhelyi	321	3991
Vinár	V	Veszprém	Pápai	264	9534
Vindornyafok	V	Zala	Keszthely–Hévízi	129	8354
Vindornyalak	V	Zala	Keszthely–Hévízi	97	8353
Vindornyaszolos	V	Zala	Zalaszentgróti	410	8355
Visegrád	T	Pest	Szentendrei	1,669	2025
Visnye	V	Somogy	Kaposvári	218	7534
Visonta	V	Heves	Gyöngyösi	2,530	3271
Viss	V	Borsod-Abaúj-Zemplén	Sárospataki	773	3956
Visz	V	Somogy	Fonyódi	213	8681
Viszák	V	Tolna	Oriszentpéteri	287	9932
Viszló	V	Borsod-Abaúj-Zemplén	Edelényi	101	3825
Visznek	V	Heves	Gyöngyösi	2,275	3293
Vitnyéd	V	Gyor-Moson-Sopron	Kapuvári	1,421	9371
Vízvár	V	Somogy	Barcsi	672	7588
Vizslás	V	Nógrád	Salgótarjáni	1,405	3128
Vizsoly	V	Borsod-Abaúj-Zemplén	Abaúj–Hegyközi	921	3888
Vokány	V	Baranya	Siklósi	951	7768
Vonyarcvashegy	V	Zala	Keszthely–Hévízi	1,960	8314
Vöckönd	V	Zala	Zalaegerszegi	97	8931
Völcsej	V	Gyor-Moson-Sopron	Sopron–Fertodi	413	9462
Vönöck	V	Tolna	Celldömölki	831	9516
Vöröstó	V	Veszprém	Veszprémi	108	8291
Vörs	V	Somogy	Marcali	478	8711

== Notes ==
- Cities marked with * have several different post codes, the one here is only the most general one.
