= Vas County 1st constituency =

Parliamentary constituency in Hungary

- Constituency for the National Assembly
- Location of Vas county 01 within Vas county

- Location of Vas county within Hungary
- County: Vas County
- Population: 86,915 (2022)
- Major settlements: Szombathely

Current constituency
- Created: 2011
- Party: Tisza
- Member: Róbert Rápli
- Elected: 2026

The Vas County 1st parliamentary constituency is one of the 106 constituencies into which the territory of Hungary is divided by Act CCIII of 2011, and in which voters can elect one member of parliament. The standard abbreviation of the name of the constituency is: Vas 01. OEVK. Seat: Szombathely.

== Area ==
The constituency includes the following settlements:

1. Balogunyom
2. Bucsu
3. Dozmat
4. Felsőcsatár
5. Horvátlövő
6. Nárai
7. Narda
8. Pornóapáti
9. Sé
10. Szombathely
11. Torony
12. Vaskeresztes

== Members of parliament ==
Name	Party	Term	Election
Csaba Hende	Fidesz-KDNP	2014 – 2025	Results of the 2014 parliamentary election:
Csaba Hende	Fidesz-KDNP	2014 – 2025	Results of the 2018 parliamentary election:
Csaba Hende	Fidesz-KDNP	2014 – 2025	Results of the 2022 parliamentary election:
Róbert Rápli	Tisza	2026 –	Results of the 2026 parliamentary election:

== Demographics ==
Historical population
Year	Pop.	±%
2011	87,261	—
2022	86,915	−0.4%

The demographics of the constituency are as follows. The population of Vas County No. 1 constituency was 86,915 on October 1, 2022. The population of the constituency decreased by 346 people between the 2011 and 2022 censuses. Based on the age composition, the majority of the population in the constituency is middle-aged with 32,209 people, while the least is children with 13,815 people. 85.3% of the population of the constituency has internet access.

According to the highest level of completed education, those with a high school diploma are the most numerous, with 27,240 people, followed by graduates with 18,826 people.

According to economic activity, almost half of the population is employed, 44,769 people, the second most significant group is inactive earners, who are mainly pensioners, with 19,921 people.

The most significant ethnic group in the constituency is German with 1,557 people and Croatian with 819 people. The proportion of foreign citizens without Hungarian citizenship is 1.9%.

According to religious composition, the largest religion of the residents of the constituency is Roman Catholic (32,496 people), and there is also a significant community of Lutherans (1,689 people). The number of people not belonging to a religious community is also significant (6,123 people), the second largest group in the constituency after the Roman Catholic religion.

== Sources ==
- ↑ Vjt.: "2011. évi CCIII. törvény az országgyűlési képviselők választásáról". Nemzeti Jogszabálytár. Magyar Közlöny Lap- és Könyvkiadó Kft.
- ↑ KSH: "Az országgyűlési egyéni választókerületek adatai". Népszámlálás 2011. Központi Statisztikai Hivatal.
