= Sárvár District =

Sárvár District Sárvári járás
- Districts of Hungary
- Coat of arms

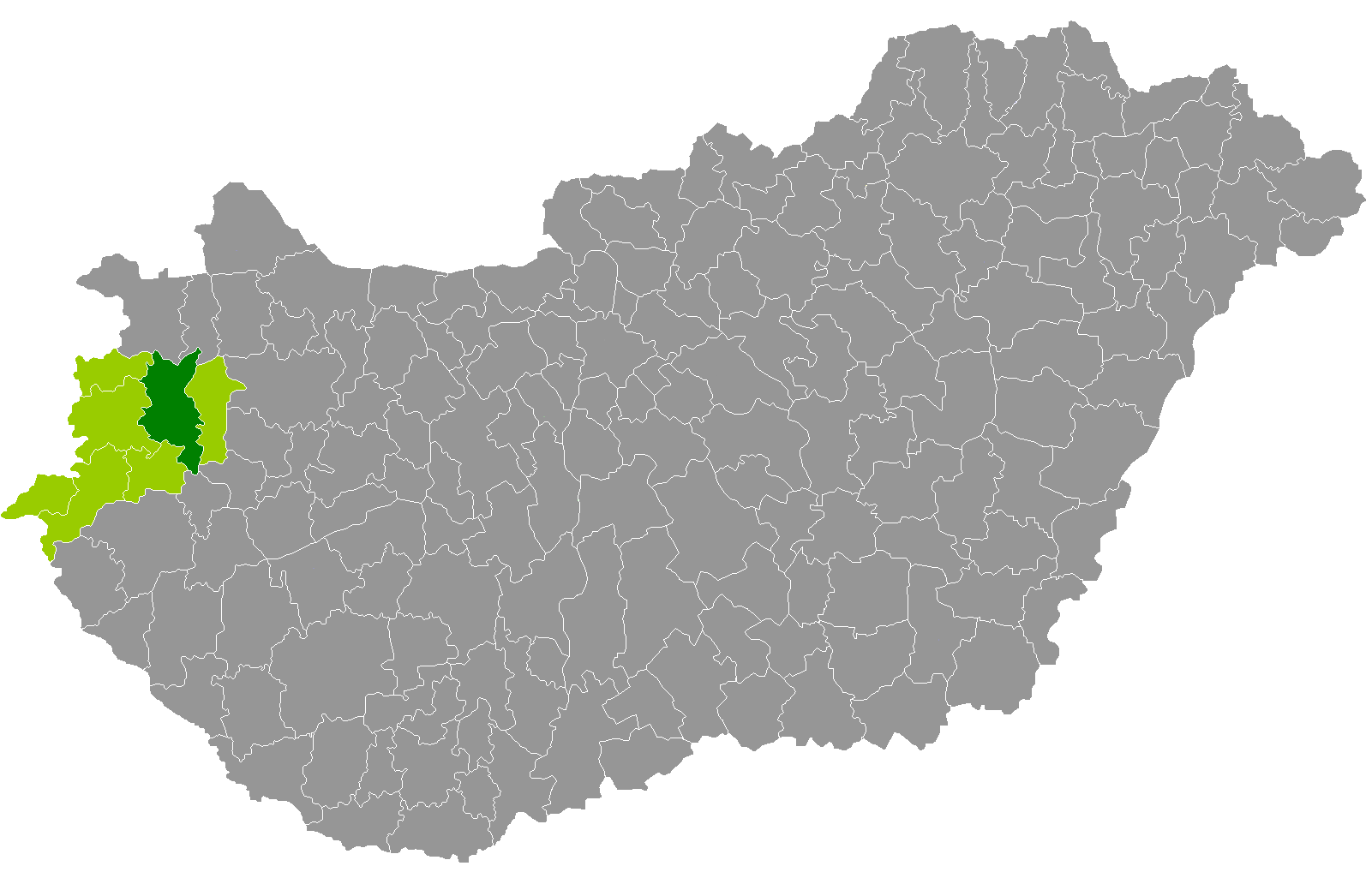
- Sárvár District within Hungary and Vas County.
- Coordinates: 47.25°N 16.93°E
- Country: Hungary
- County: Vas
- District seat: Sárvár

Area
  - Total: 685.46 km^{2} (264.66 sq mi)
  - Rank: 1st in Vas

Population (2011 census)
  - Total: 38,684
  - Rank: 2nd in Vas
  - Density: 56/km^{2} (150/sq mi)

Sárvár (Hungarian: Sárvári járás) is a district in central-eastern part of Vas County. Sárvár is also the name of the town where the district seat is found. The district is located in the Western Transdanubia Statistical Region.

== Geography ==
Sárvár District borders with Sopron District and Kapuvár District (Győr-Moson-Sopron County) to the north, Celldömölk District and Sümeg District (Veszprém County) to the east, Zalaszentgrót District (Zala County) to the south, Vasvár District to the southwest, Szombathely District and Kőszeg District to the west. The number of the inhabited places in Sárvár District is 42.

== Municipalities ==
The district has 2 towns and 40 villages. (ordered by population, as of 1 January 2013)

- Bejcgyertyános (449)
- Bögöt (398)
- Bögöte (271)
- Bő (707)
- Chernelházadamonya (208)
- Csánig (350)
- Csénye (699)
- Gérce (1,110)
- Gór (304)
- Hegyfalu (794)
- Hosszúpereszteg (666)
- Ikervár (1,795)
- Jákfa (504)
- Káld (1,105)
- Kenéz (276)
- Meggyeskovácsi (659)
- Megyehíd (320)
- Mesterháza (155)
- Nagygeresd (281)
- Nemesládony (138)
- Nick (484)
- Nyőgér (328)
- Ölbő (733)
- Pecöl (817)
- Porpác (135)
- Pósfa (266)
- Rábapaty (1,648)
- **Répcelak** (2,659)
- Répceszentgyörgy (108)
- Sajtoskál (382)
- **Sárvár** (14,812) – district seat
- Simaság (553)
- Sitke (673)
- Sótony (650)
- Szeleste (671)
- Tompaládony (305)
- Uraiújfalu (876)
- Vasegerszeg (397)
- Vashosszúfalu (353)
- Vámoscsalád (289)
- Vásárosmiske (349)
- Zsédeny (185)

The bolded municipalities are cities.

== Demographics ==
Religion in Sárvár District (2011 census)
1. Catholic Church (63.6%)
2. Greek Catholicism (0.10%)
3. Lutheranism (8.30%)
4. Calvinism (1.40%)
5. Other religions (0.50%)
6. Non-religious (3.10%)
7. Atheists (0.50%)
8. Undeclared (22.5%)

In 2011, it had a population of 38,684 and the population density was 56/km^{2}.

Year	County population	Change
2011	38,684	n/a

=== Ethnicity ===
Besides the Hungarian majority, the main minorities are the German (approx. 500) and Roma (400).

Total population (2011 census): 38,684
Ethnic groups (2011 census): Identified themselves: 34,410 persons:

- Hungarians: 33,185 (96.44%)
- Germans: 512 (1.49%)
- Gypsies: 390 (1.13%)
- Others and indefinable: 323 (0.94%)

Approx. 4,000 persons in Sárvár District did not declare their ethnic group at the 2011 census.

=== Religion ===
Religious adherence in the county according to 2011 census:

- Catholic – 24,648 (Roman Catholic – 24,606; Greek Catholic – 32);
- Evangelical – 3,200;
- Reformed – 543;
- other religions – 209;
- Non-religious – 1,197;
- Atheism – 177;
- Undeclared – 8,710.

== See also ==
- List of cities and towns in Hungary
