= Bucsu =

- Location of Vas county in Hungary

- Location of Bucsu
- Coordinates: 47.26506°N 16.49491°E
- Country: Hungary
- County: Vas

Government
  - Type: Mayor–council
  - Mayor: Timea Horváth

Area
  - Total: 16.54 km^{2} (6.39 sq mi)

Population (2010)
  - Total: 594
  - Density: 35.91/km^{2} (93.0/sq mi)
- Time zone: UTC+1 (CET)
  - Summer (DST): UTC+2 (CEST)
- Postal code: 9792
- Area code: 94

Bucsu (German: Butsching, Croatian: Bučura, Buča (Note: There is variation in the Serbo-Croatian name for the village with ethnic Serbo-Croats from Felsőcsatár using the term Bučura and those in Horvátzsidány using the term Buča.)) is a village in Vas County, Hungary, in the vicinity of Szombathely. It is on the border with Austria, and there is a road crossing the border from Bucsu to Rechnitz and Schachendorf.

The historical center of the village consists of two rows of houses, somewhat enlarged around the middle. Between the rows flows the Arany-patak creek, running from Rohonc (Austria) toward Szombathely. The most notable landmark of the village is its 13th-century church located at 8 Rohonc Street and named after the archangel Michael. Until as late as 1756 it was surrounded by a cemetery, however this has today been moved to a nearby hill. The church was used in the 17th century by Lutheran inhabitants, and later by Catholic believers. The high altar is decorated by the baroque statues of Saint John Nepomuk, Saint Joseph, Saint Anthony, and Saint Ignatius. The internal painting of the church as well as the tabernacle, were done by George Dominek.

== Geography ==
Bucsu is located 10 km west of Szombathely at the Austrian border. Neighboring communities include Perenye, Bozsok, Gencsapáti, Szombathely, Narda, Dozmat, Torony, Csajta (Schachendorf, Austria), and Rohonc (Rechnitz, Austria).

== Origin of its name ==
The name "Bucsu" comes from the Hungarian name "Bulcsú". It is believed that the village was the winter residence of a 10th-century horka named Bulcsú who occupied this region.

== History ==
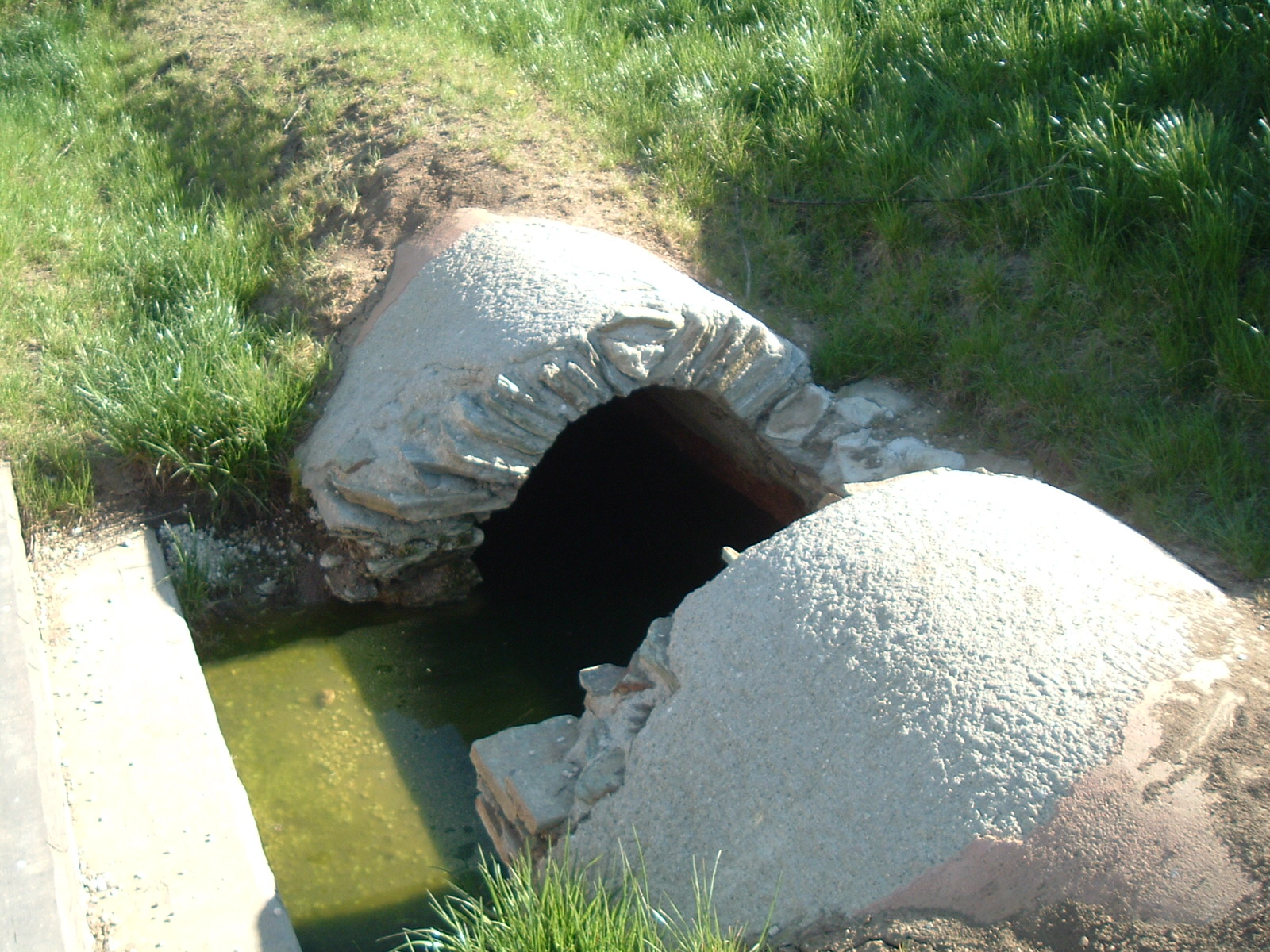
Part of the Roman aqueduct supplying water to ancient Savaria, unearthed at Bucsu.

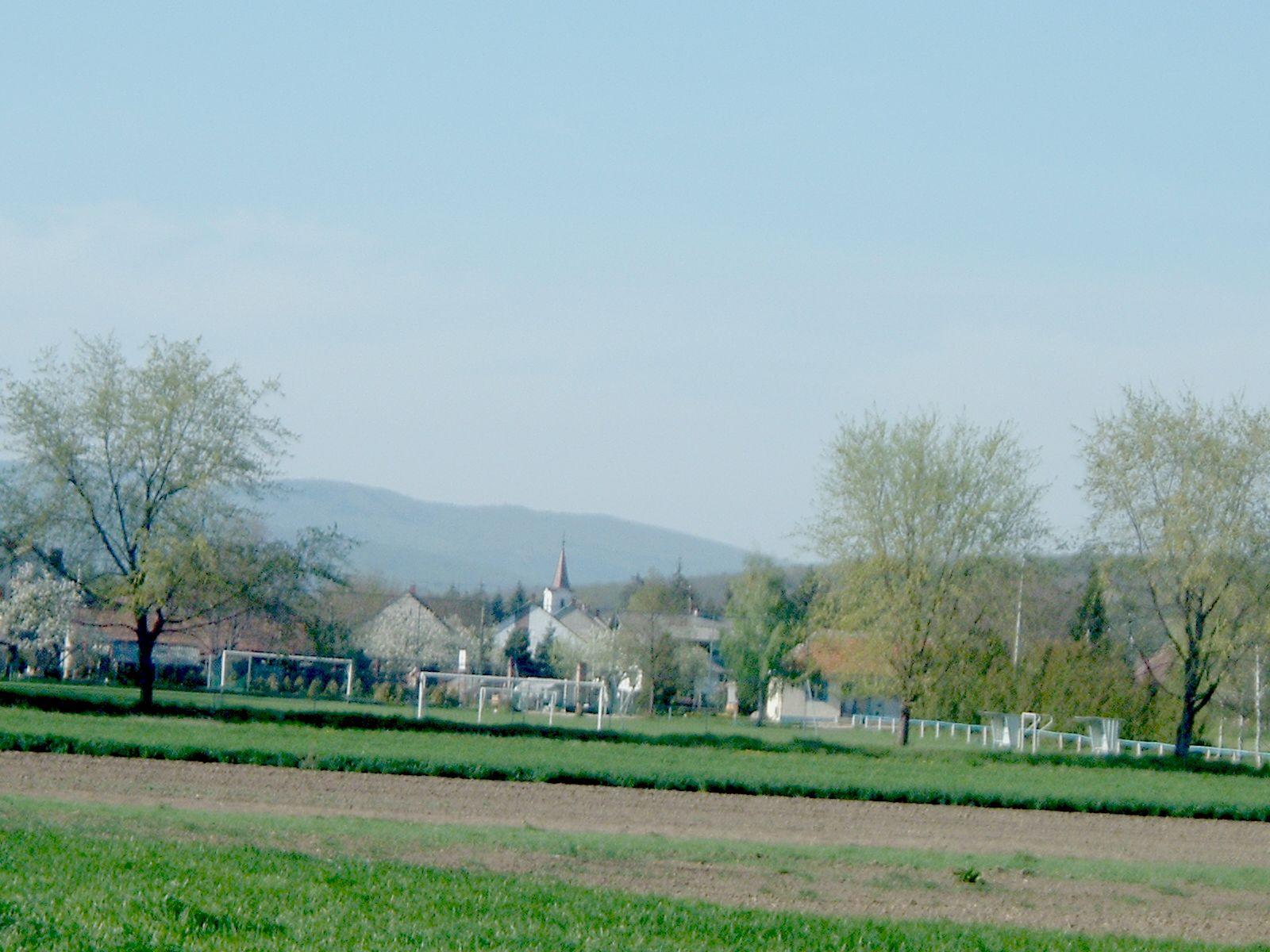
A shot of the Saint Michael Church and the historical center of the village.

The history of human settlement in the area goes back at least to Roman times. Within the vicinity of Bucsu were discovered the remains of a Roman aqueduct that supplied Savaria (the Latin name of Szombathely) with drinking water from the mountainous village Bozsok and the town of Rohonc (today Rechnitz, Austria). The earliest written record of the village of Bucsu is found in documents from the medieval Hungarian archives of 1236 where it is called Bulchu. The foundation of its church dates to the 14th century. Documents from the 15th century also mentioned it variously by the names "BwlchW" (1433) and "Bwcsw" (1485)

In a 1796 work, scholar András Vályi claimed a village 1.75 mérföld from Szombathely had in the past been variously named Bucsu, Bucsa, and Bucsina with the inhabitants belonging to more than one ethnic group and religion - the majority of whom were Hungarian and Roman Catholic. Vályi mentions that the landowner family, Vajda, owned a manor house during this period, (Note: Today the same building is used by the Hungarian border guard.) and the lands surrounding the village produced several varieties of first class agricultural goods for sale by the residents, although it lacked vineyards.

Scholar Elek Fényes wrote in 1851 that "Bucs" or "Butsing" was a Hungarian village 1 mérföld distant from Szombathely, with lands totaling 429 kath. and situated within the territorial boundaries of the town of Kőszeg. The non-Catholic population demographics were listed as 28 Jews and 6 Lutherans. Fényes mentions multiple mansions in the village and describes its plains areas as capable of producing good quality wheat. Non-agricultural areas of the village consisted mainly of forest, with grape imports grown on the hills of Rohonc (Rechnitz, Austria). Prominent landowners in the 19th century are listed by Fényes as Szabó, Széll, and Vajda.

In an 1898 monograph Bucsu is described as "a nicely situated Hungarian village with 82 houses, 575 Roman Catholic and evangelical inhabitants. The village has a number of mansions including those of landowner Ödön Széll, Szombathely mayor Ernő Szabó, and Mrs. János Németh de Dömötör." The 1910 population of Bucsu had grown to 640 inhabitants. The mail and telegram service was provided by the town of Rohonc/Rechnitz, but after 1921 the community gained its own post office.

Bucsu was the site of a camp for forced labourers during World War II until 28 March 1945. After the war the village was connected to the Hungarian electricity circuit.

Because Bucsu was no longer considered an official frontier crossing place after 1953, the train between Szombathely and Pinkafő (Pinkafeld, Austria) that had been introduced in 1888 was stopped and the tracks were eliminated. In 1976 the road was opened for crossing the Hungarian-Austrian border toward Rohonc (Rechnitz, Austria) and a connecting road was built toward main road 89

The community gained access to a water conduit system in 1986 and natural gas in 1993. The water system was updated to include slot water removal in 2003.

== Notable landmarks ==
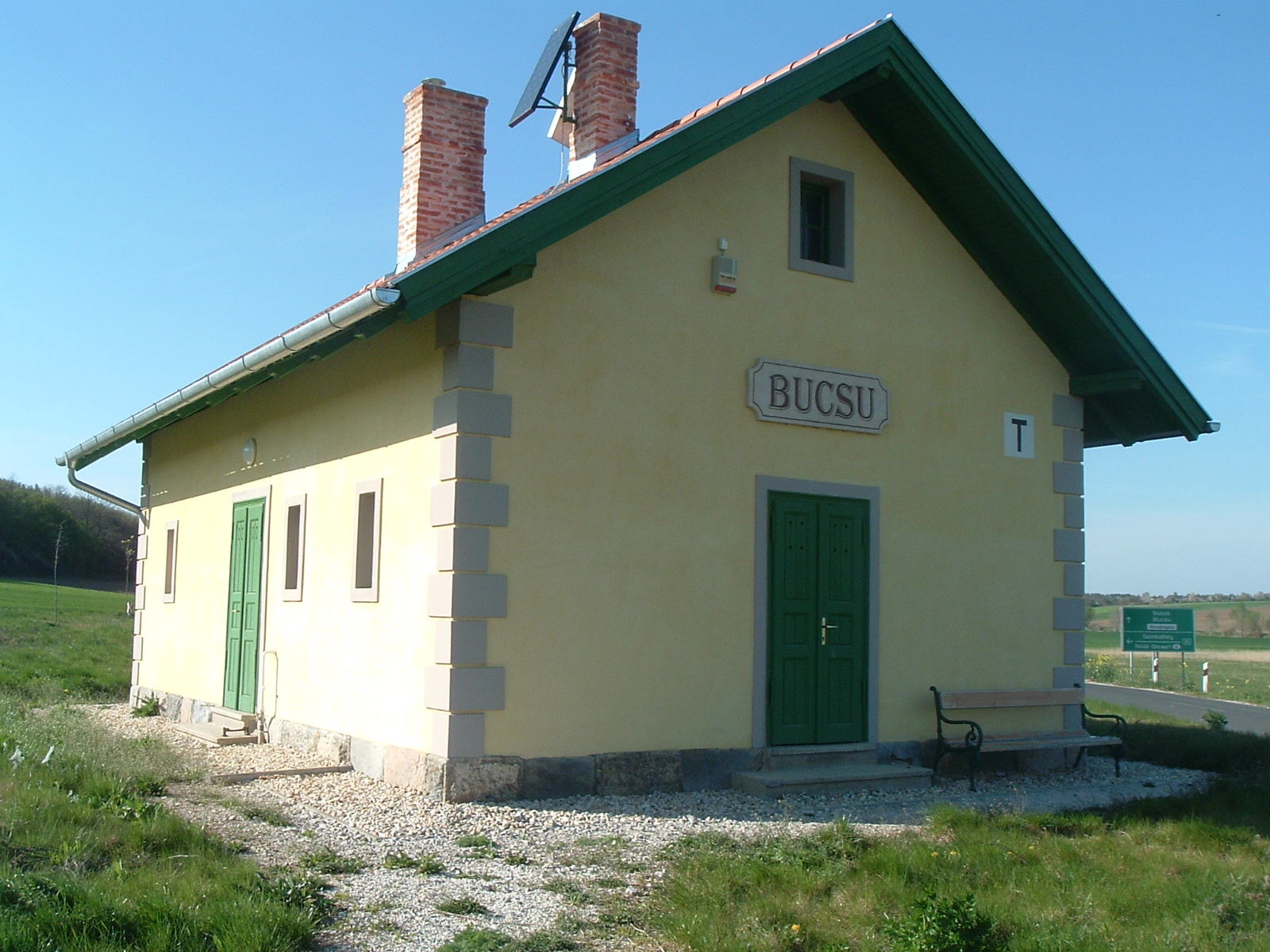
The former Bucsu railroad station.

Prominent landmarks within Bucsu include the 13th/14th century Saint Michael Church, (Note: The church was renovated in a Baroque style in the 18th century.) The opened remains of the Roman Aqueduct system, the former railroad station, the Ödön Széll mansion (Note: Later owned by Felix Techet and later by Gyula Sonnevend.) (currently used by the Hungarian Border Guard), the Szabó mansion (currently converted into a block of flats), and the bicycle path going to Eisenberg (Austria)

== Notable residents ==
The Bucsu branch of the Széll family became known for a number of notable Hungarian professionals and cabinet ministers. Among these are included prime minister Kálmán Széll (1843–1915) and Secretary of internal affairs József Széll (1880–1956). Anna Hertelendy, the grandmother of statesman Ferenc Deák (known as "the wise man of Hungary") was also born in Bucsu. Famous residents of Bucsu are discussed in a publication in Vasi Szemle by T. and K. Széll.
