= Nemesbőd =

- Village
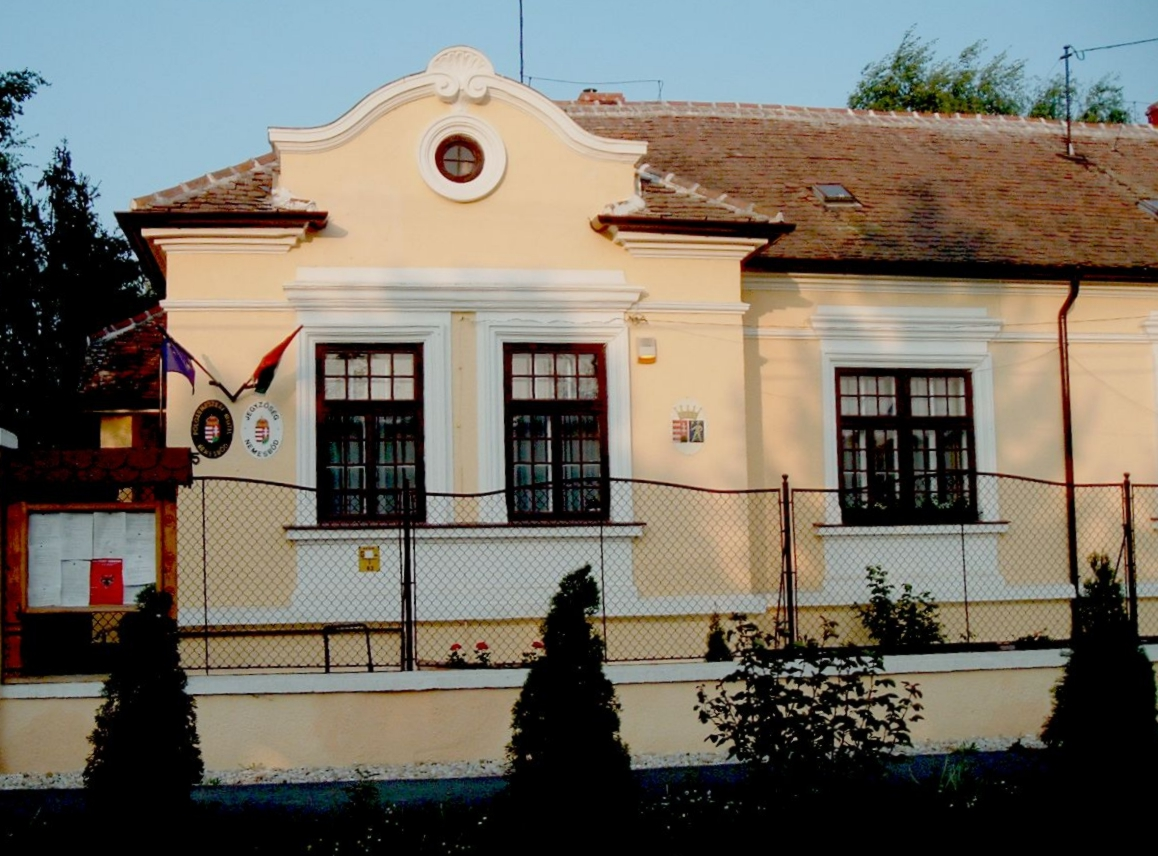
- The town hall

- Flag Coat of arms

- Location of Nemesbőd in Hungary
- Coordinates: 47°16′10.74″N 16°44′4.13″E
- Country: Hungary
- Region: Western Transdanubia
- County: Vas
- District: Szombathely
- Rank: Village

Area
  - Total: 9.14 km^{2} (3.53 sq mi)

Population (2010)
  - Total: 638
  - Density: 69.8/km^{2} (181/sq mi)
- Time zone: UTC+1 (CET)
  - Summer (DST): UTC+2 (CEST)
- Postal code: 9749
- Area code: +36 94
- Website: www.nemesbod.hu

Nemesbőd is a village in Vas county, Hungary.

== Geography, geology, and demographics ==
The village of Nemesbőd is located in the middle section of the Gyöngyös plain, about 10 km northeast from Szombathely and adjacent to Szombathely's Zanat section. Neighboring communities include Vát, Vasszilvágy, Vép, and Vassurány. Nemesbőd is accessible via the main route 86.

Historically, Nemesbőd has offered residents an agricultural lifestyle. According to the 18th century scholar, András Vályi, "Bőd is a region of miscellaneous character, mostly planar and fertile. Its meadows are rich and well-suited to growing a wide variety of agricultural produce, crops, fruits, and poultry. The pastures are not the best, but other produce can easily counterbalance this draw-back as it is easily salable."

The scholar Elek Fényes writes that "Bőd is a Hungarian village with 654 Catholic and 8 Lutheran inhabitants. The foundation of their trade is regular trips to Vienna in order to sell homegrown poultry." In 1910 Bőd had 749 Hungarian inhabitants and the village belonged to the Szombathely district.

== History ==
=== Origin of the village's name ===
The name "Nemesbőd" comes from the archaic Turkish noun "bő" (meaning "head of the clan"). The prefix "Nemes-" (meaning "noble") was later added to the name of the village to reflect the fact that many of its inhabitants belonged to the lower- or middle-nobility. In the 19th century there were three villages in Hungary called "Bőd". The first known record of Nemesbőd in the National Archives of Hungary comes from a 1226 document where it is referred to as "Beud". Contemporaneously, another village in Szolnok-Doboka County of Hungary's Transylvanian region (today known as Bőd or Beudiu) was known as Beud by as early as 1214. The third Bőd is described in Anonymous' Gesta Hungarorum where it is written that in the year 895 Árpád's troops crossed the river Tisza close to the present town of Csongrád at the ferry of Bőd (16 km from Kassa, and today known as Magyarbőd or Bidovce). (Note: Anonymous wrote his Gesta in the 13th century so it is likely that he would have been personally acquainted with Bőd/Beud.)

Within the historic materials of Hungarian National Archives, the spelling of Nemesbőd's name changes greatly from century to century. The village was originally called "Beud" in 1226, then "Bud" in 1344, later "Bod" (in 1356), "Antalbeud" (1387), "Beud" again (1418), "Bwd" (1441), "Bewd" (1444), "Beed" (1449), "Bed" (1460), "Bőd" ("Building") (1872), and finally "Nemesbőd" in the modern era when the prefix "nemes-" was added to the word "Bőd".

Another possibility for the origin of the name is that the town is named after Hungary's first bishop, Saint Bőd. According to traditional accounts, Saint Gellért, together with his fellow bishops Bőd and Beneta/Beszteréd and with Lord Lieutenant Szolnok, hurried outward from Fehérvár to greet Prince András who was returning home from Kijev. (Note: Bőd was one of the earliest if not the very first Hungarian bishop. The Slavic Beneta/Beszteréd the Bishop of Nyitra. The hermit, Gellért, was called forth from his solitude in Bakonybél by Saint Steven after the king had subdued Ajtony, and Gellért had become the bishop of Marosvár. It is likely that this is where Gellért met Saint Bőd for the first time, and this connection explains both of their presences as members of the Prince's reception committee.) The bishops and Lord Szolnok spent the night in the residents' building of the Sabina Church (Kamaraerdő, foothill of Kőérbek) on 24 September 1046. The following day, they went to the ferry of Pest where the three pontiffs and Lord Szolnok were ensnared and martyred by pagans under the command of Vata.

=== Village history ===
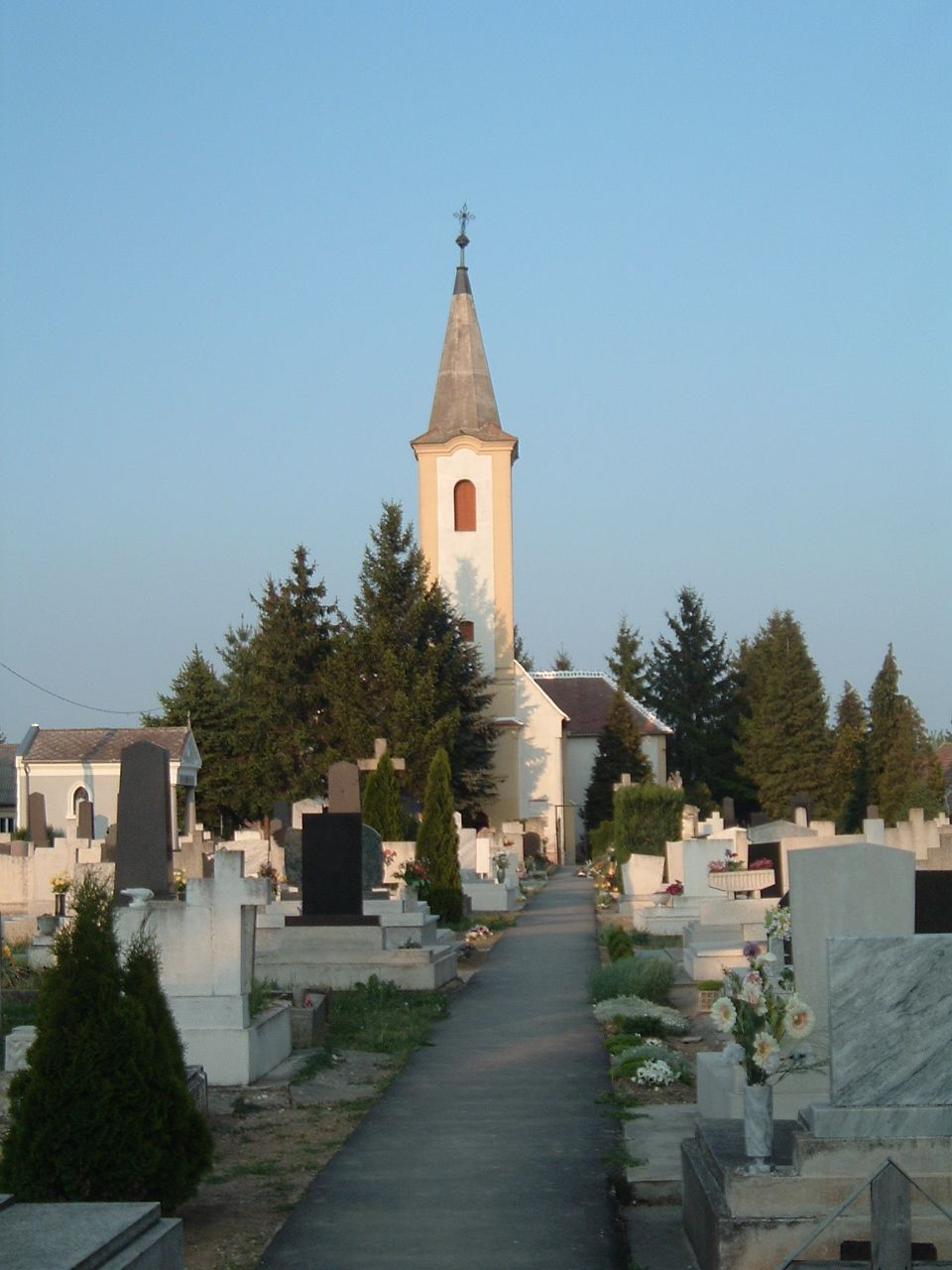
The first record of Saint Michael's Church comes from the 14th century in 1344 (church cemetery pictured).

The territory of Nemesbőd has been inhabited since ancient times, and Roman relics have been found throughout the region.

According to the records of the Cistercian Order:

"....another Szentgotthárd is in the valley of the river Rába. It is worth mentioning that this Abbey, located at the German border, received its staff from the areas inhabited by ethnic Hungarians. Among them, in a document issued by King Imre in 1194, the following names had been quoted as living in Bőd: Arud, Bek, Szolgad, Szombat, Varsa, Varo".

Major landowner families in subsequent years would include the Ballia, Békássy, Bödei, Czycz, ‘Sidó, Széll, and Váti families. Further noble families associated with the village include the Balogh, Dömölky, Dukay, Fábián, Gálos, Hegedüs, Kun, Mesterházy, Porpáczy, Szerdahelyi, Tompa, and Vajda families.

The Roman Catholic Church in Bőd was mentioned for the first time in a Hungarian National Archive document dated 1344. It is named after the Archangel Michael, and it was used in the 16th century by the Lutheran denomination until 1647 when it became Catholic again. The church was rebuilt and enlarged in 1788 and further in 1938.

In 1627 Vas, Veszprém, and Zala counties held their county meeting in the village Nemesbőd, which earlier was closer to Szombathely (at the creek going to Vép). The meeting point was later moved to somewhat higher ground to the east, due to frequent flooding.

== Coat of arms ==
Vas County created a registry in 1907 to list coats of arms approved by the state offices for official use in rubber stamps and seals. Many of the older stamps were lost, however registered stamps extend back to at least 1862 as evidenced by one found on a tax certificate from that date. It is from these registries that the coat of arms of Nemesbőd is known.

The Nemesbőd coat of arms depicts images suggesting its past history of frequently fighting against invading Turks. Within the coat of arms, two shields occupy the escutcheon. The shield on the left side is the Small Coat of Arms of the State of Hungary, the shield on the right represents a champion with a Turkish head on his sabre. The legend reads: "The Seal of the Noble Community of Beöd". The shields are connected by a golden crown with five knobs. This crown as well as the legend suggest that this style of coat of arms was used during the Reform Era of the Austro-Hungarian dualism. The shields are blue and red, thus, the flag of Nemesbőd is blue and red. Gold may also be included and substituted by yellow.
