= Nárai =

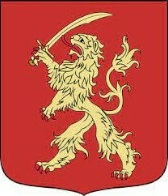
- Coat of arms

- Location of Nárai in Hungary
- Coordinates: 47°11′36″N 16°33′14″E
- Country: Hungary
- Region: Western Transdanubia
- County: Vas
- Subregion: Szombathelyi
- Rank: Village

Area
  - Total: 15.99 km^{2} (6.17 sq mi)

Population (1 January 2008)
  - Total: 1,144
  - Density: 71.54/km^{2} (185.3/sq mi)
- Time zone: UTC+1 (CET)
  - Summer (DST): UTC+2 (CEST)
- Postal code: 9797
- Area code: +36 94
- KSH code: 17367
- Website: www.narai.hu

Nárai is a village in Vas county, Hungary.

== Location ==
The village is 7 km southwest of Szombathely. Other neighbouring settlements are Ják, Horvátlövő, Vaskeresztes, Felsőcsatár, Torony and Sé.

== Origin of name ==
Its name probably comes from the slavic personal name Narayov.

== History ==
In the area of the village evidence of Iron Age settlements, namely celtic tumuli has been found. In the Roman age this area was on the outskirts of Sabaria, with villas and plantations of the citizens of the colonia. Ruins of these along with crocks and Roman coins were found in the 19th century on one of the hills of the village.

The village was first mentioned in 1238 under the name terra Narey, and in 1257 as villa Naree. Later it was noted as Nara (1434), Nare (1447) and Naray (1468). In 1447 there was already a church consecrated to Saint Thomas standing in the village. The ancient landlord of the village was the Náray family, whose members held high offices since the Middle Ages. In 1549 there were two more noble families in the village: the Sárfys and the Bassos. In 1583 the village was destroyed by fire along with the whole archives of the Náray family. After the Turkish havoc, the population was resettled mainly with Croat people. In 1598 the village had 13 cottars living in it, its landowners were the Anyos, Kerekes, Bolday, Náray and Sárffy families. In 1627 the village had 22 one-lotted nobles, of which 17 belonged to the Náray family. A tax conscription in 1707 found 17 nobles and three widows of nobles in Nárai. A 1744 conscription mentions 25 villeins and 33 cottars, while in 1774 there were 56 villeins and 29 cottars living in the village. In 1746 the nobles of the village received a charter of affirmation of their rights from palatine János Pálffy. In 1780 the village had 545 inhabitants.

According to András Vályi: "NÁRAJ. Nasrein. Mixed village in Vas county. Landlords are Skerlecz and other nobles, inhabitants are catholic, lays 1 mile from Szombathely, border is good, has several goods; its ploughlands are also good, producing surplus for trade."

The chapel of the cemetery, built in 1826, is the only scheduled monument of the village. In 1832 there were 26 house-owning cottars and six without their own house. Several craftsmen (smith, taylor, weaver, butcher) were working in the village.

Elek Fényes wrote: "Náraj, hungarian village, in Vas county, one hour from Szombathely: 634 cath., 8 jew inhab. Cath. paroch. church. Field fertile march. L[and].l[ords] Lipics, Eörsy, Szabó, Pálffy etc."

The first cadastral map of the village was made in 1857.

In the monography of Vas county (1898): "Nárai old patritian village, with 152 houses an 867 r. cath. and luth., hungarian inhabitants. Post and telegraph in Szombathely. In its borders signs of Roman buildings, pots and coins have been found. The Nárays took their noble name from here. Ancient nest of the Szabó family of Nárai."

At the end of the 19th century, many náraians emigrated to America because of poor living conditions. 45 of the inhabintants were killed in World War I, a monument for them was set up on June 19, 1939. In the second world war, 31 villagers were killed. Hostilities spared the village, it was rather the violence of the "liberating" soviet soldiers and an aircraft crash in the outskirts of the village that left marks in the memories. A collective farm was funded in 1960 and a community centre was opened on November 7, 1962.

Nárai is part of the suburbia of Szombathely. Because of suburbanisation, the population of the village is growing.

== Places of interest ==
- St. Thomas Church
- Baroque chapel
- Charnel-house of the Nárai-Szabó family
