= Felsőcsatár =

Felsőcsatár Gornji Četar
- Village
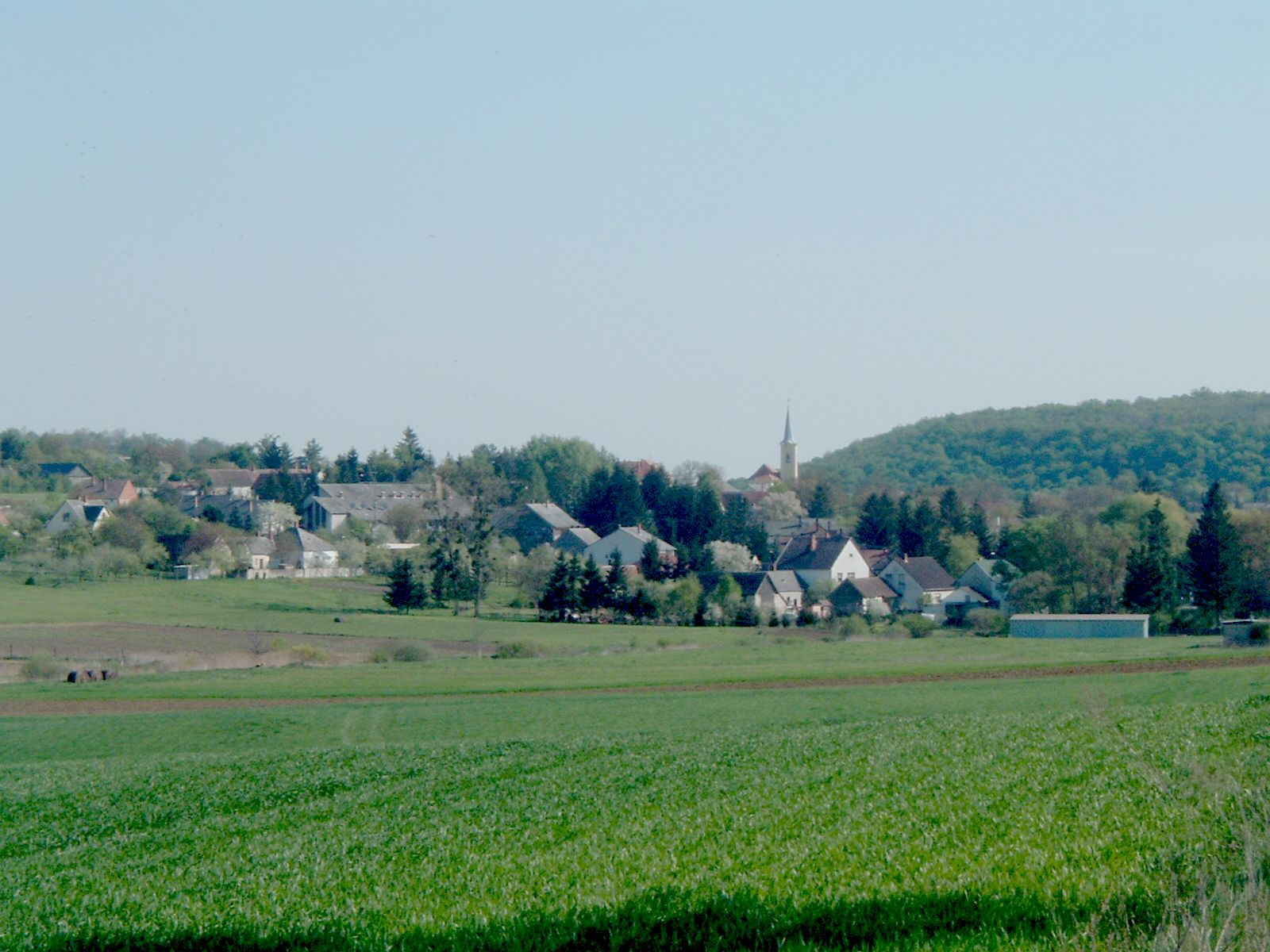

- Flag Coat of arms

- Location of Felsőcsatár
- Coordinates: 47.21499°N 16.44512°E
- Country: Hungary
- Region: Western Transdanubia
- County: Vas
- District: Szombathely

Area
  - Total: 17.9 km^{2} (6.9 sq mi)

Population (1 January 2025)
  - Total: 498
  - Density: 27.8/km^{2} (72.1/sq mi)
- Time zone: UTC+1 (CET)
  - Summer (DST): UTC+2 (CEST)
- Postal code: 9794
- Area code: (+36) 94
- Website: www.felsocsatar.hu

Felsőcsatár (Croatian: Gornji Četar; German: Ober-Schilding) is a village in Vas County, Hungary.

== Location ==
The nearest villages are Narda, Vaskeresztes, Torony, Dozmat and Nárai in Hungary, and Burg in Burgenland, Austria.

== History ==
Earliest written mention of the town is originally uniform from 1244 survived Chatard form. Based on its name, which means shield producers from the Árpád-era villages calculated to include where you live arms manufacturers, who were close to the Old Castle.

The royal Várföldi eladományozása IV in 1244. Bela associated with the estate bailiff gave ÓVÁRI Mod. In the 14th and 15th century the old family was in possession of the village. In 1449 John Hunyadi and the Csémi- Káldy-family donated some of it. In 1455 the former Óvár várbirtokot Baumkirchner the family received it, who subsequently bought the ovarian parts too. So then attached Employer manor. In the 16th century, acquired by the Batthyány, who was called to the Croatian settlers instead of the one destroyed in 1532 during the siege of Köszeg population.

The end of the 1500s survived the first sign that the town was divided into two parts. He was then Lower Forward village gentry (Chatard Noble, 1586), mainly belonging to the families living locally (e.g. Csiszar, Kery, Weres, Molnar). In 1601 may have been a noble family tree together, but most of this century has been the same-Kery family. Later, the Batthyány family this episode has also extended its authority.

Felsőcsatár, named Big striker also left the feudal serf village period. During the Batthyánys has belonged to the run, then the Rohonc lordship, they followed the story, but the owners sold to pawn several times. First half of the 20th century, the family was Sághy large part of the border.

The village has several times been a significant destruction. In 1471 it was burned and plundered the assets of the serfs Baumkirchner opponents. In addition to the Turkish attack in 1532, 1553, plague Miaa ten buildings left vacant. In 1574 the entire town burnt down due to the passing mercenary army invasion. After the uprising Bocskai 22 houses had to rebuild.

Both took place at the border of viticulture since the Middle Ages. Aaron lower Buckle 1744 64 Upper Buckle Aaron wrote together nearly four hundred kapásnyi area. Past master of the place near the beginning of the 17th century has been preserved on record.

1921 frontier commission executive of the Trianon peace treaty was first sentenced to Austria, but the protests of local residents as a result of changes in the decision and returned to Hungary in early March 1923.

The border of the village in 1952, opened zsírkő- (talc) mine, which was the only one in the country. The 1960s golden age of the plant will employ more than one hundred people, in later years reduced their production and operating by the end of 1996.
