= Pecol =

Pecol may refer to:

- Pecöl, Hungary
- Pecol, Italy, a frazione in Cortina d'Ampezzo, Veneto, Italy
