= M86 expressway (Hungary) =

Road in Hungary

M86 expressway
- M86-os autóút
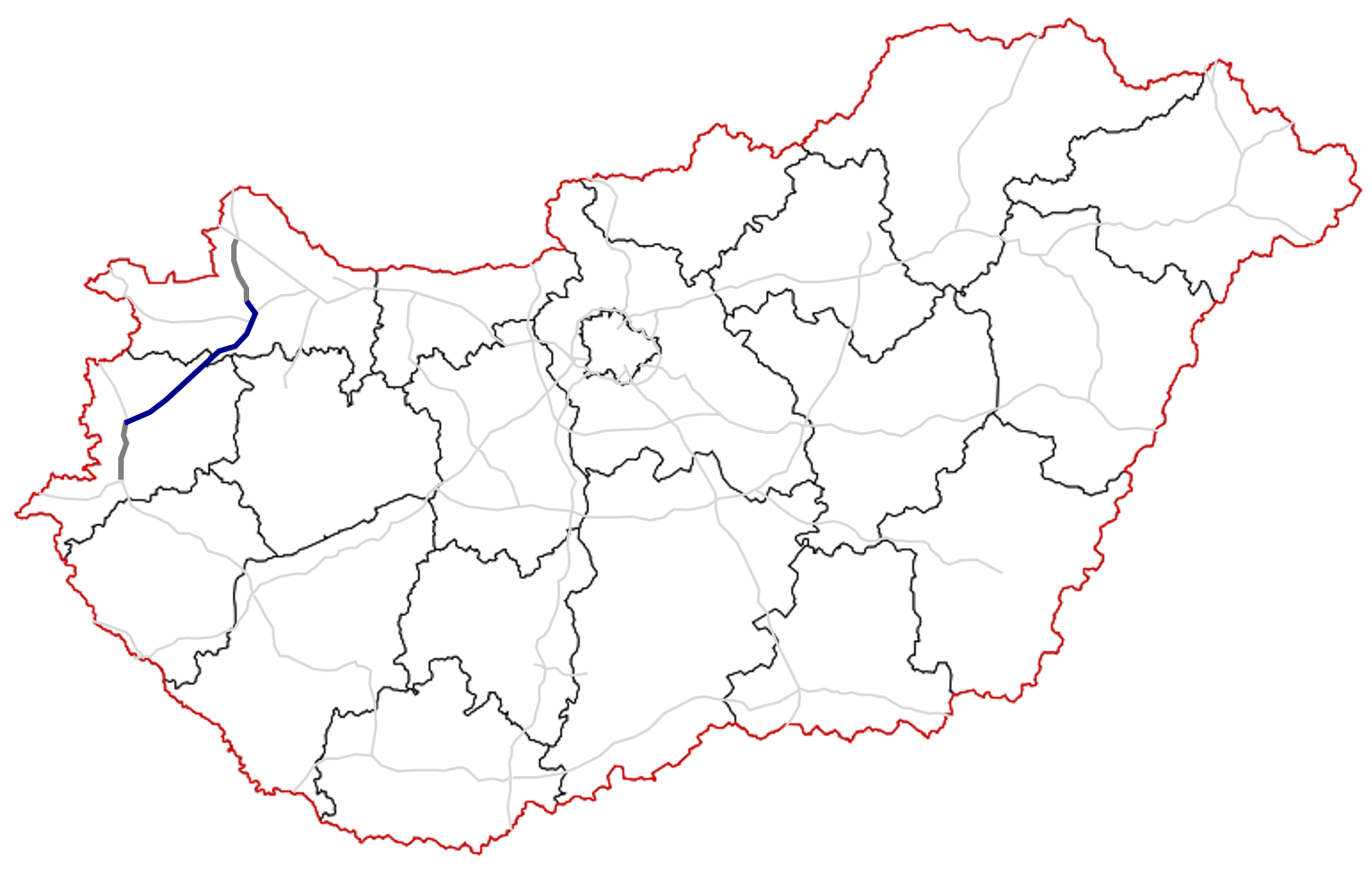
- in use planned other highways

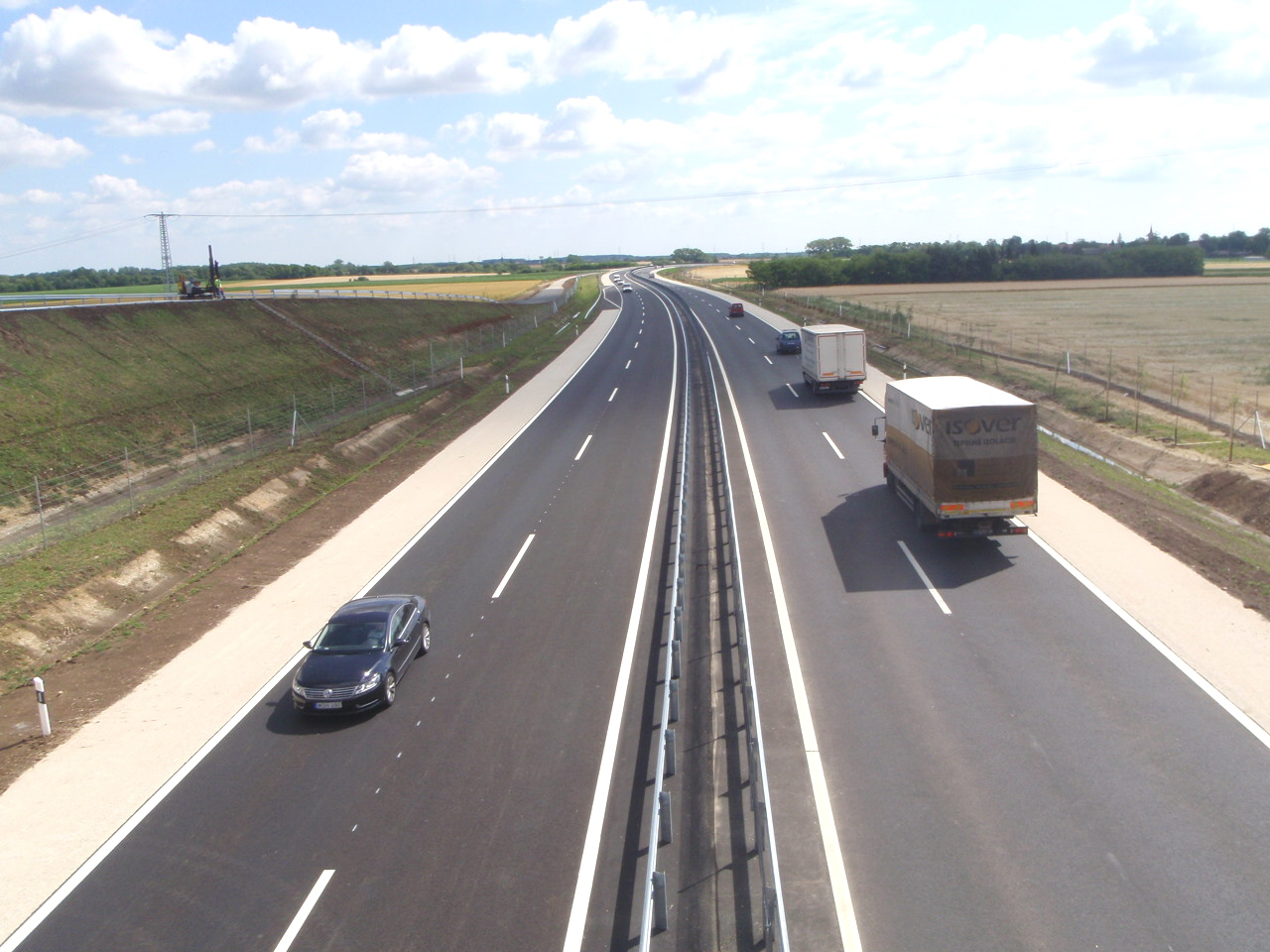
- M86 near Vép

Route information
- Part of E65
- Length: 71 km (44 mi) 115 km (71 mi) planned
- Existed: 2008–present

Major junctions
- From: 89 in Szombathely
- 88 near Vát; 84 near Hegyfalu; M85 near Csorna
- To: M1 near Mosonmagyaróvár (planned)

Location
- Country: Hungary
- Counties: Vas, Győr-Moson-Sopron
- Major cities: Szombathely, Csorna, Mosonmagyaróvár

Highway system
- Roads in Hungary; Highways; Main roads; Local roads

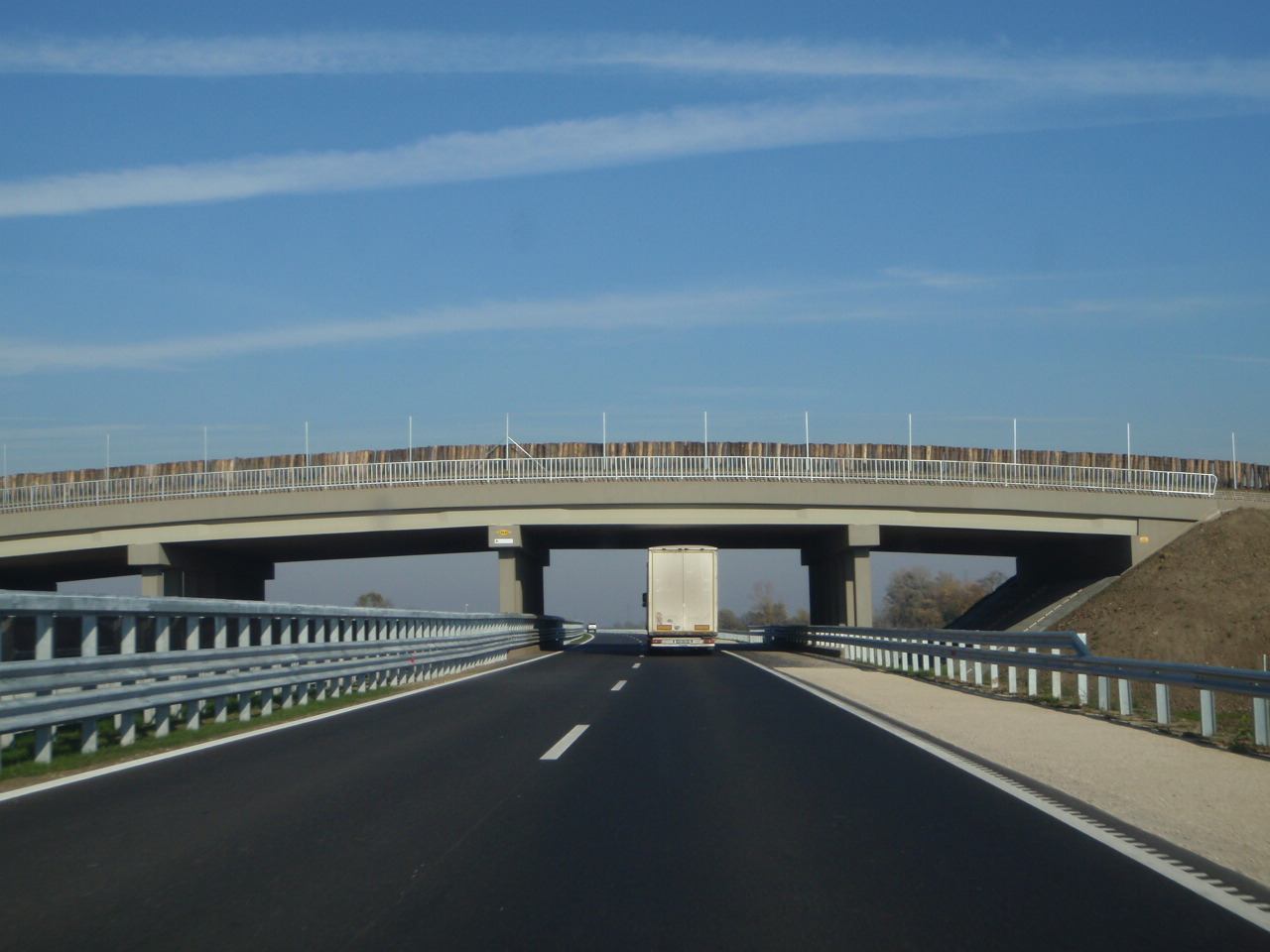
Wild gateway near Pósfa

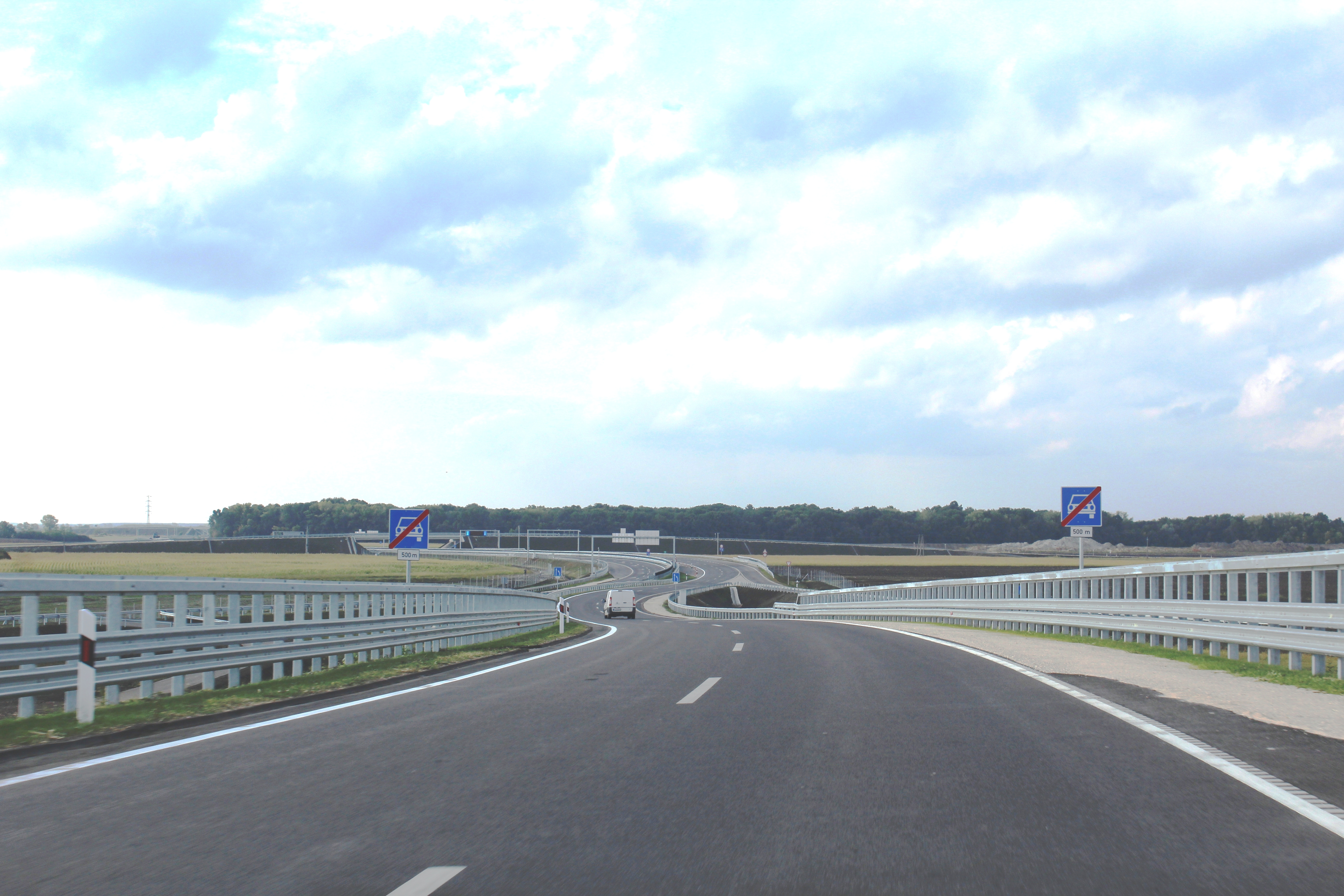
Junction (M85-M86) near Csorna

The M86 expressway (Hungarian: M86-os autóút) is a Hungarian expressway connecting Szombathely to Csorna or Győr, towards to Budapest.

== Openings timeline ==
- Szombathely – Vát (9.2 km): 2014.07.24.
- Vát bypass (3.8 km): 2009.06.10.
- Szeleste bypass (4.6 km): 2010.12.15.
- Szeleste – Main road 84 (7.5 km): 2015.09.18.
- Main road 84 – Szilsárkány (33.4 km): 2016.10.25.
- Csorna bypass; I.section (east) (5 km): 2015.09.09.; (this section was extended 2x3 lane)

== Junctions, exits and rest area ==
- The route is full length expressway. The maximum speed limit is 110 km/h, with (2x2 lane road).

km		Destinations	Route	Notes
81	Exit	Szombathely	87	The western terminus of European routes E65 and the expressway.
86	Exit	Nemesbőd, Vép	8445	
94	Exit	Vát, Sárvár	88	
97	Exit	Ölbő, Szeleste	8446	
99.2	Bridge	Bridge over Railway Line 16 (Hegyeshalom-Szombathely)		
101.4	Bridge	Wild gateway		
105	Exit	Hegyfalu, Zsédeny	84	
111	Rest area	Vámosacsaládi pihenőhely		Rest area:
116	Exit	Répcelak, Nick	8447	
124	Exit	Beled, Rábakecöl	8611	
Border of Vas and Győr-Moson-Sopron Counties
130.2	Bridge	Wild gateway		
133	Exit	Magyarkeresztúr	8605	
135	Rest area	Rábaközi pihenőhely		Rest area:
140	Exit	Bogyoszló, Szilsárkány	86; 8601	
143	Interchange	M86-M85 interchange (Csorna bypass)	M85	Southern part of Csorna bypass Connection to Sopron and Austria
144	Bridge	Bridge over Railway Line 14 (Pápa-Csorna)		
148	Bridge	Bridge over Railway Line 8 (Győr-Sopron)		
148	Interchange	M86-M85 interchange (Csorna bypass)	M85	Eastern part of Csorna bypass Connection to Győr toward to M1 motorway
150	Roundabout	Mosonmagyaróvár	86	
	Exit	Jánossomorja	86	
	Interchange	M86-M1-M15 interchange	M1; E60; M15; E75	M1 connection to Győr, towards to Budapest or Austria; M15 connection to Slovakia

- Planned section

== Maintenance ==
The operation and maintenance of the road is provided by Hungarian Concession Infrastructure Development Plc..

- in Szombathely, mixed
- in Csorna, mixed

== Payment ==
Hungarian system has 2 main types of tolls:

1. Time-based fee vignettes (E-matrica); with a validity of either 6,400 Hungarian forint (Ft) for 10 days, 10,360 Ft for 1 month and 57,260 Ft for a year, from 1 January 2024.
2. County vignettes (Megyei matrica); instead of the national sticker, the highway can be used with the following county stickers:

Type of county vignette	Available section
Vas	between Szombathely and Beled (81 km – 124 km)
Győr-Moson-Sopron	between Répcelak and Csorna-north (116 km – 153 km)

== See also ==
- Roads in Hungary
- Transport in Hungary
- International E-road network
