= Zsédeny =

- Village
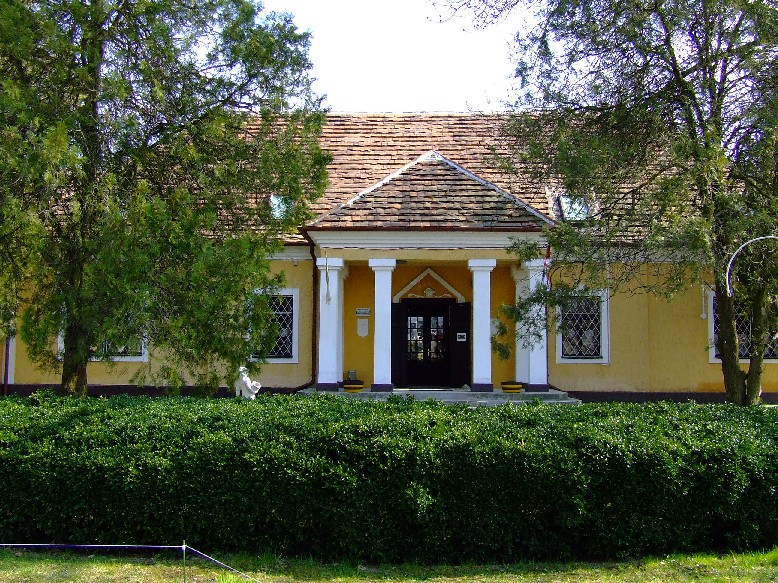

- Flag Coat of arms

- Location of Zsédeny
- Coordinates: 47.34183°N 16.90502°E
- Country: Hungary
- Region: Western Transdanubia
- County: Vas
- District: Sárvár

Area
  - Total: 6.43 km^{2} (2.48 sq mi)

Population (1 January 2026)
  - Total: 219
  - Density: 34.1/km^{2} (88.2/sq mi)
- Time zone: UTC+1 (CET)
  - Summer (DST): UTC+2 (CEST)
- Postal code: 9635
- Area code: (+36) 95
- Website: zsedeny.hu

Zsédeny is a village in Vas county, Hungary. It is located along the 84th main transportation route, approximately 10 km from Sárvár, on flat, lean, sandy terrain, towards Sopron.

== History ==
Its ancient roots are evident in the archaeological discovery of a prehistoric burial mound within the village's boundaries. The name Zsédeny dates back to the Árpád era, with its first mention found in documents from 1238. Over time, the village was referred to as Kiszsédeny and Vadkert.

As early as the 13th century, a significant road passed through Zsédeny, connecting Egerszeg and Paty. Not far from this road stood the church dedicated to Saint Martin, the patron saint of the village. The Catholic Church, dedicated to Saint Martin and of medieval origin, features a late Baroque altar. It is part of the European Saint Martin route, and a memorial plaque on its wall commemorates the names of Zsédeny soldiers who fell in the First and Second World Wars. Additionally, the village has a separate Lutheran church, with a memorial plaque honoring Zsédeny István, a galley slave preacher, unveiled in 2001.

Zsédeny's original landowners were likely the local residents, later becoming royal property after the suppression of pagan uprisings. It passed into the hands of the Várnép family and subsequently to the Köcskis, Jakos, Mezőlakiaks, and Ostffys. Later feudal lords included the Cherneleks and Taaroks (Taar Berzsenyi Jenő), followed by the Maróthy families (Maróthy István). The Maróthys built the existing Maróthy mansion in the mid-19th century, possibly under Maróthy László, in a romantic-eclectic style. Until 1945, the family owned the estate, and after a period of neglect, it was renovated by the Fiedler family as part of the castle program. The mansion now operates as a hotel with a 20,000 m2 park, offering accommodation in apartments and double rooms, with meeting facilities for approximately 20 people. The mansion also houses an independent archaeological collection, featuring ancient objects, documents, and a noteworthy collection of old stoves, sewing machines, and travel trunks. A monogrammed brick collection is integrated into one of the walls in the lower lounge, adding a unique touch.

Before 1945, Zsédeny had a local government. After 1945, it was part of the Hegyfalu district, and from October 22, 1950, an independent council and administrative body were established. Following a resolution of the Presidential Council of the People's Republic, from January 1, 1969, Zsédeny became part of Hegyfalu's joint council. After the political changes, Zsédeny established its own municipal office, which continues to operate to this day. However, it does not independently maintain other institutions. The municipality provides preschool and elementary education in Rábapaty. Until January 1984, it was part of the Sárvár district, and after the dissolution of districts, it became a municipality in the Sárvár city region. Currently, Zsédeny is a member of the Sárvár and its Surroundings Multifunctional Microregion Association (Sárvár és Kistérsége Többcélú Kistérségi Társulás).
