= Róbert Rápli =

Hungarian politician

Member of the National Assembly
- Incumbent
- Assumed office 9 May 2026
- Preceded by: Csaba Hende
- Constituency: Vas 1st

Personal details
- Party: Tisza

Róbert Rápli is a Hungarian politician who was elected member of the National Assembly in 2026 representing the Vas County 1st constituency. He previously worked as a school principal.
