= Szilsárkány =

- Flag Coat of arms

- Location of Győr-Moson-Sopron county in Hungary

- Location of Szilsárkány
- Coordinates: 47.53957°N 17.25533°E
- Country: Hungary
- County: Győr-Moson-Sopron

Government
  - Mayor: Kéri Károly (Ind.)

Population (2022)
  - Total: 686
- Time zone: UTC+1 (CET)
  - Summer (DST): UTC+2 (CEST)
- Postal code: 9312
- Area code: 96
- Motorways: M86
- Distance from Budapest: 162 km (101 mi) East

Szilsárkány is a village in Győr-Moson-Sopron county, Hungary.
