= Vaszar =

- Location of Veszprém county in Hungary

- Location of Vaszar
- Coordinates: 47.40325°N 17.51608°E
- Country: Hungary
- Region: Central Transdanubia
- County: Veszprém

Government
  - Mayor: Varga Péter

Area
  - Total: 33.69 km^{2} (13.01 sq mi)

Population (2004)
  - Total: 1,608
  - Density: 47.72/km^{2} (123.6/sq mi)
- Time zone: UTC+1 (CET)
  - Summer (DST): UTC+2 (CEST)
- Postal code: 8542
- Area code: 89

Vaszar is a municipality in Veszprém county, Hungary.

== Location ==
Vaszar is situated approximately 8 km from Pápa, near the Gerence stream, on the back of one of the stretching hills on the edge of Sokoróalja. Two hills can be found in its outskirts (Mézeshegy, Gyulahegy). It is approachable by train via the Győr–Celldömölk railway.

=== Neighbouring settlements ===
- Gecse, Takácsi, Pápa, Vanyola.

== History ==
Archaeological findings show that Vaszar was already populated in the Bronze Age. Its earliest documented mention is from 1332. Everyday objects, ranging from prehistoric to the Late Middle Ages, have been found on its territory. During the Middle Ages it was the centre of the Győr bishopric's Veszprém estates. From 1403 it belonged to the Bakonybél Abbey for a while. From 1567 to 1592 it was under Turkish rule, during which time it was abandoned. Later, in the 18th century, it was repopulated.

Situated 8 kilometres North-northeast of Pápa, Vaszar is an ancient settlement. Archaeological studies between their borders in the 1930s and 1960s show that the area has been inhabited since ancient times. Artefacts from the Bronze Age, the early Iron Age, the Avar period and the Hungarian conquest show that the area was liked and well suitable for establishing living conditions. Forest and swampy lakes surrounded the ridgeline, on which the village was built.

In 1910, 2125 of the 2126 inhabitants were ethnic Hungarians, of which 2055 were Roman Catholic and 56 were Evangelical.

At the start of the 20th-century Vaszar belonged to Veszprém county's Pápa Processus.

== Attractions ==
- Roman Catholic church built in 1790 in the late baroque style, surrounded by scenes from Calvary.
- The Vaszar-Gecse Hunting Association

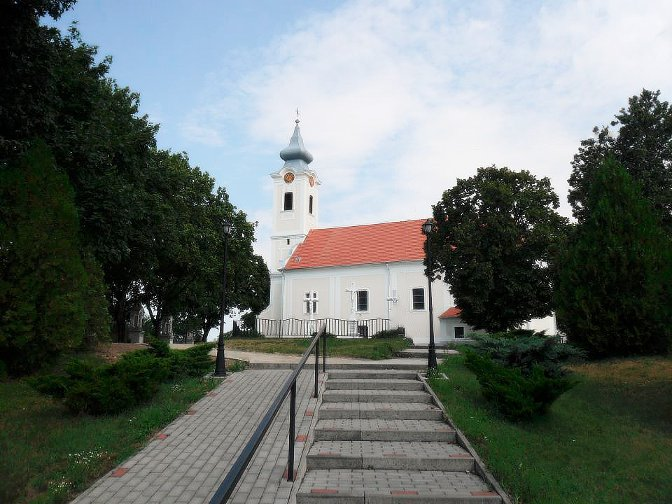
The Szent György Roman Catholic church in Vaszar, Hungary

== Ihász Gábor primary school ==
On 6 January 1994, the primary school at 9 Fő street took the name of the linguist and priest, Ihász Gábor, born in the village 200 years before. On 26 November 2005, the institution celebrated its centenary, receiving a certificate of appreciation from the Ministry of Education.

The school houses a local historical exhibition.

== Notable people ==
- Linguist and priest, Ihász Gábor, was born here in 1804
- Surgeon professor, Ihász Mihály, was born here in 1931

== Sport ==
The Vaszar Sports Association has specialised classes for football, bowling and women's handball.

The Ihász Gábor primary school ensures junior football education within the framework of the Góliát Mc Donald's football tournament and the Bozsik football academy. There are also mass sport, football and chess teams.
