= Kenez (surname) =

Kenez or Kenéz is a surname. Notable people with the surname include:

- Béla Kenéz (1922–1994), Hungarian wrestler
- György Kenéz (born 1956), Hungarian water polo player
- Levent Kenez (born 1978), Turkish journalist and writer
- Peter Kenez (born 1937), Hungarian-American historian

== See also ==
- Kenéz, locality in Hungary
