= Bő =

- Bő
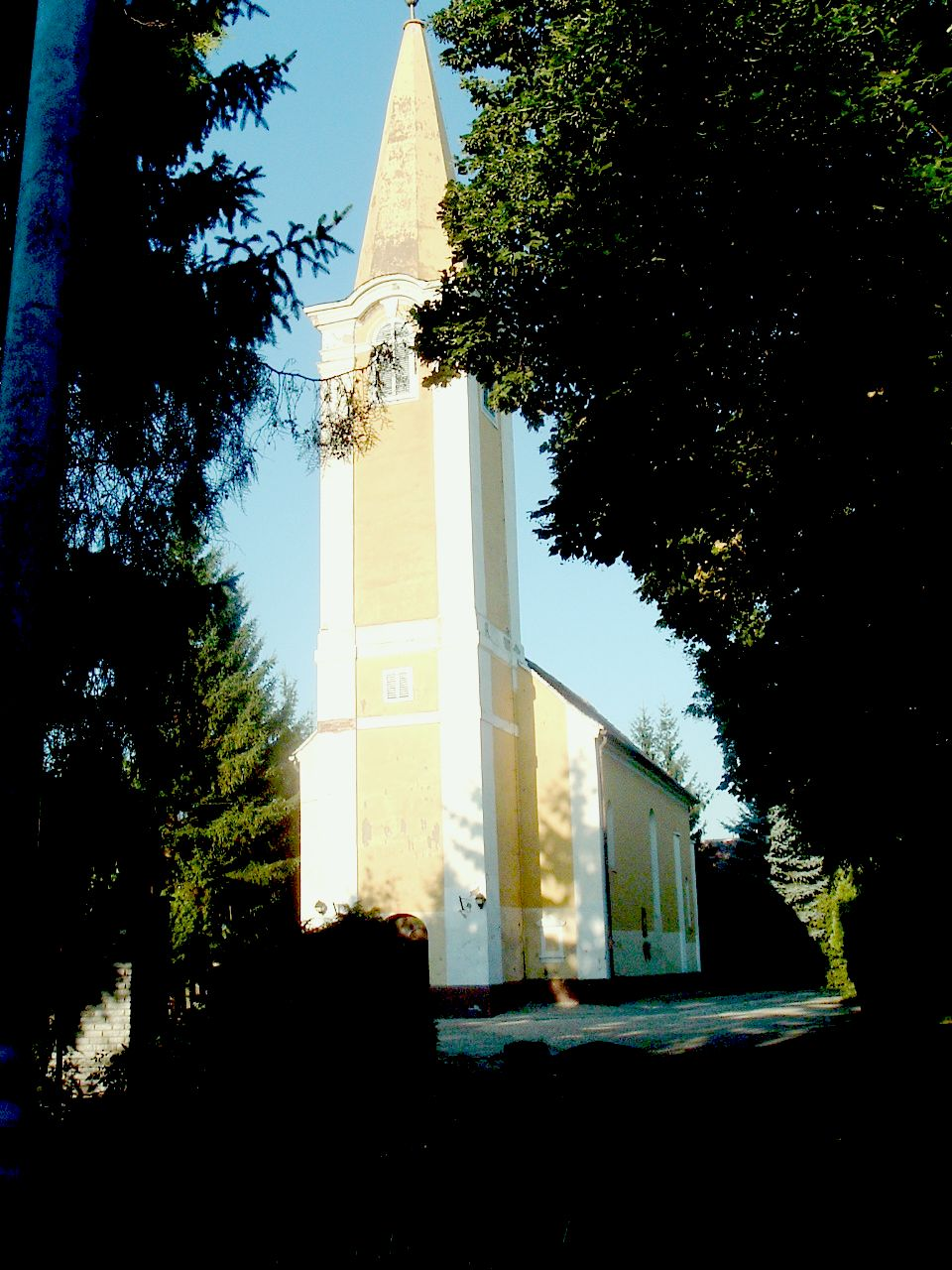

- Flag Coat of arms

- Location of Vas county in Hungary

- Location of Bő
- Coordinates: 47.36853°N 16.81646°E
- Country: Hungary
- Region: Western Transdanubia
- County: Vas
- District: Sárvár

Area
  - Total: 10.66 km^{2} (4.12 sq mi)

Population (2004)
  - Total: 679
  - Density: 63.69/km^{2} (165.0/sq mi)
- Time zone: UTC+1 (CET)
  - Summer (DST): UTC+2 (CEST)
- Postal code: 9625
- Area code: 94
- Website: http://www.bo.hu

Bő is a village in Sárvár District of Vas County, Hungary, with a population of 679 (2004), covering an area of 10.66 km^{2} (4.12 sq mi).
