= Dozmat =

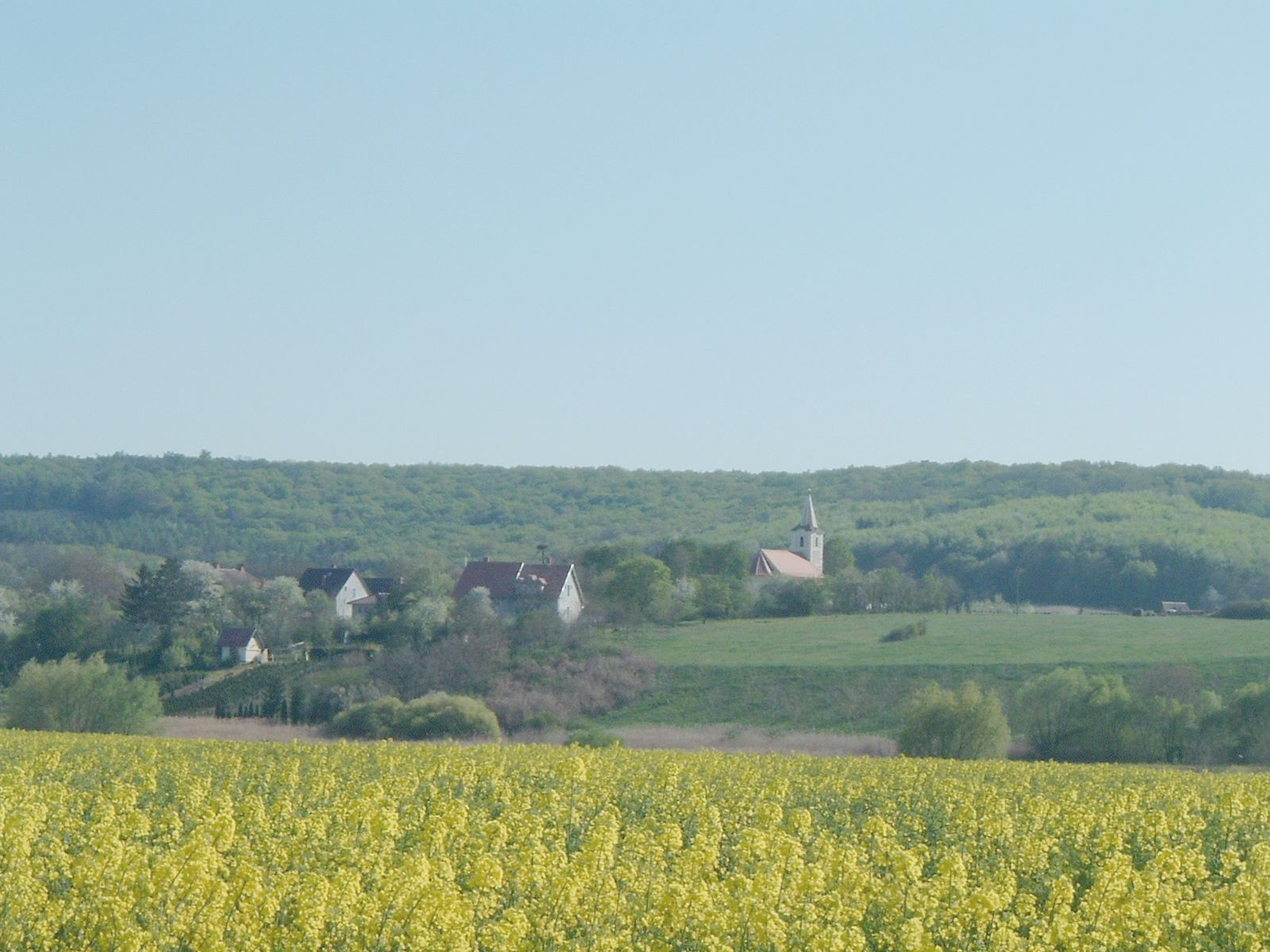
- Photograph of Dozmat from the east.

- Seal

- Location of Vas county in Hungary

- Location of Dozmat
- Coordinates: 47.23494°N 16.51446°E
- Country: Hungary
- County: Vas

Area
  - Total: 8.54 km^{2} (3.30 sq mi)

Population (2004)
  - Total: 187
  - Density: 21.89/km^{2} (56.7/sq mi)
- Time zone: UTC+1 (CET)
  - Summer (DST): UTC+2 (CEST)
- Postal code: 9791
- Area code: 94

Dozmat is a village in Vas County, Hungary.

== Geography and setting ==
The village can be found 8 km west of Szombathely, on the creek Arany. This region is called Alpokalja (Subalps) because of the vicinity of the Alp Mountains in Austria. The neighbouring villages are: Narda, Torony, Felsőcsatár, and Bucsu.

== History ==
In the vicinity of the village, a Neolithic settlement was found. During the Hungarian arrival in the 8-9th century it was the place of the court of Bulcsú and his servants. The church of the village was built in the 12th century and its patron was Saint George.

The village is frequently mentioned in medieval charters: in 1269 as villa Duruzmot, in 1281 as Duruzomat, in 1291 as Durzumot, in 1333 as Dorzmat, in 1355 as Torndurzmata, in 1358 as Dorozmath, in 1416 as Eghazasdorozmath, in 1430 as Kysdorozmath, in 1466 as Dorsmath, in 1472 as Drozmath.

== The old mythical song of „Dozmati Regőlés” ==
Very old traditions of the folk art and songs were collected in this village. The most well known is the song of „Dozmati Regőlés”.

== Sightseeing: the old church of Dozmat ==
This church was a center for the neighbouring villages in the 14th century. In 1690 the church was burned and it was renewed in the next decade, mostly in baroque style. However, recent architectural archaeology has revealed the old carvings of the western tower doorway. This frieze edge is very similar to a belt ornament of an avar-hun belt buckle.
