= Schachendorf =

Schachendorf Cajta
- Municipality
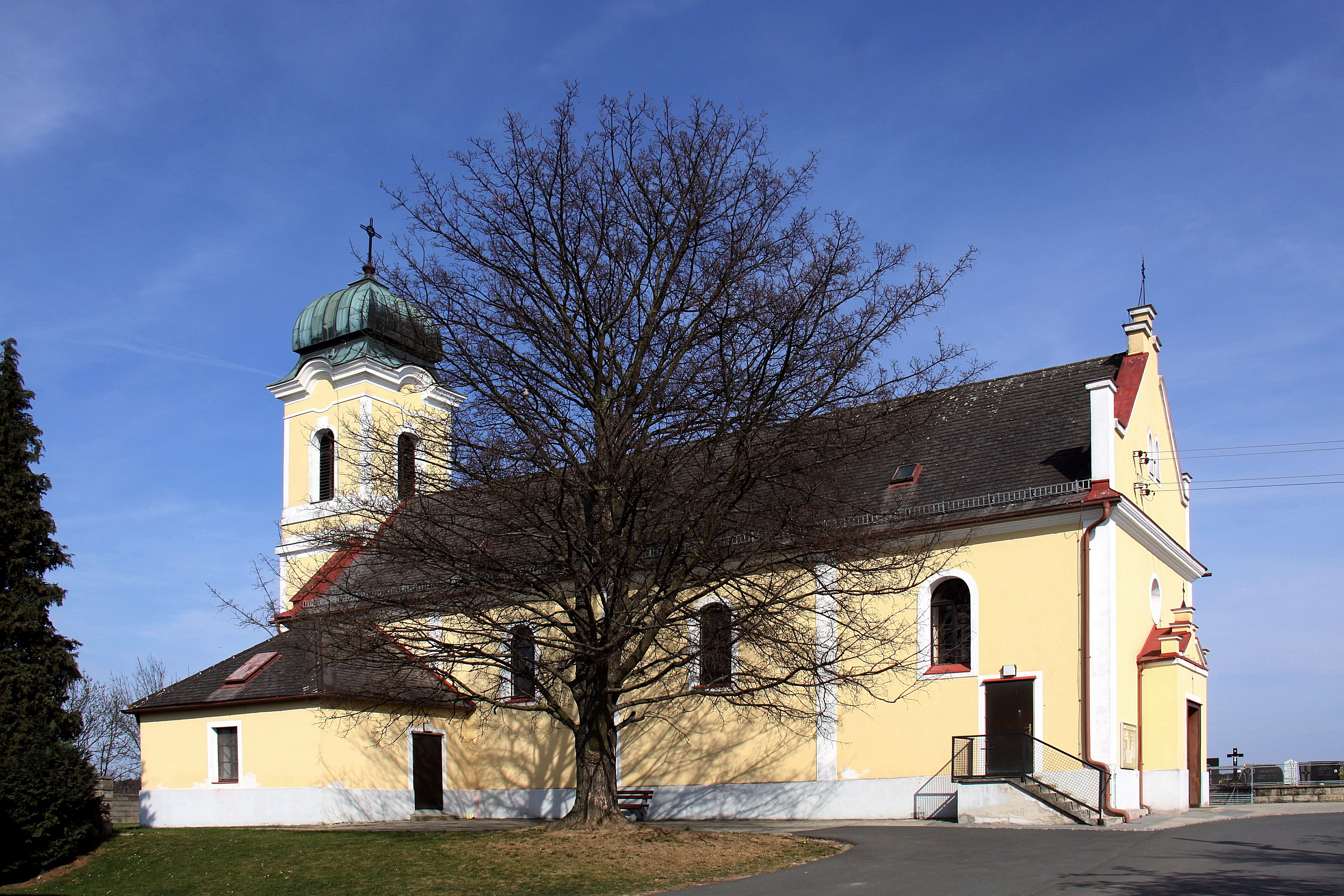
- Schachendorf parish church

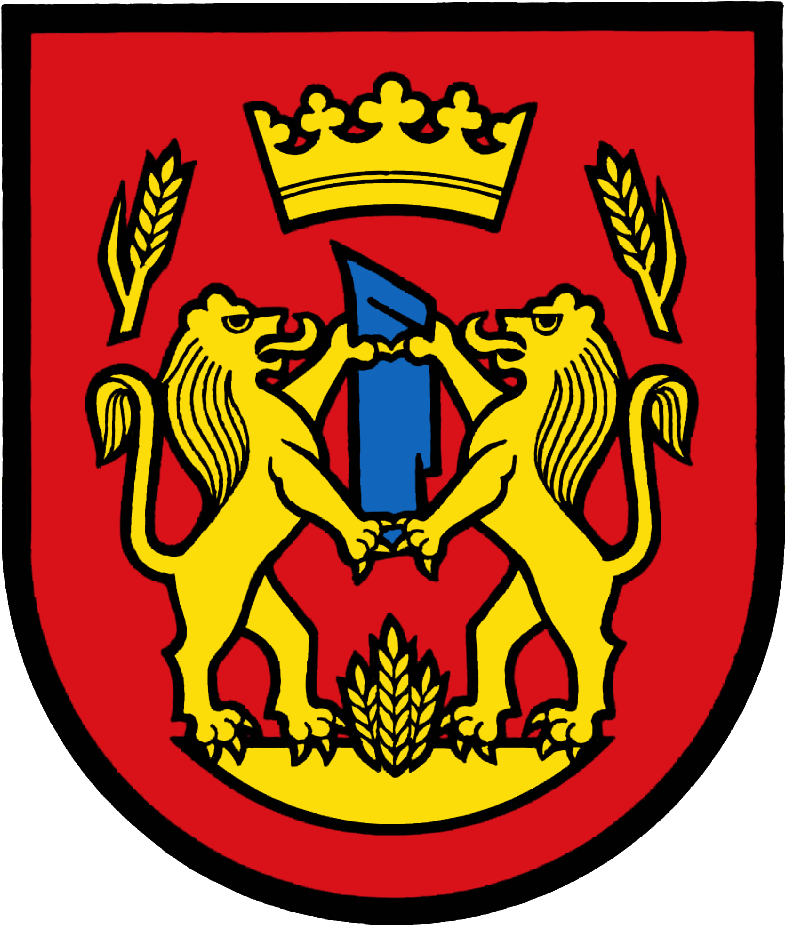
- Coat of arms

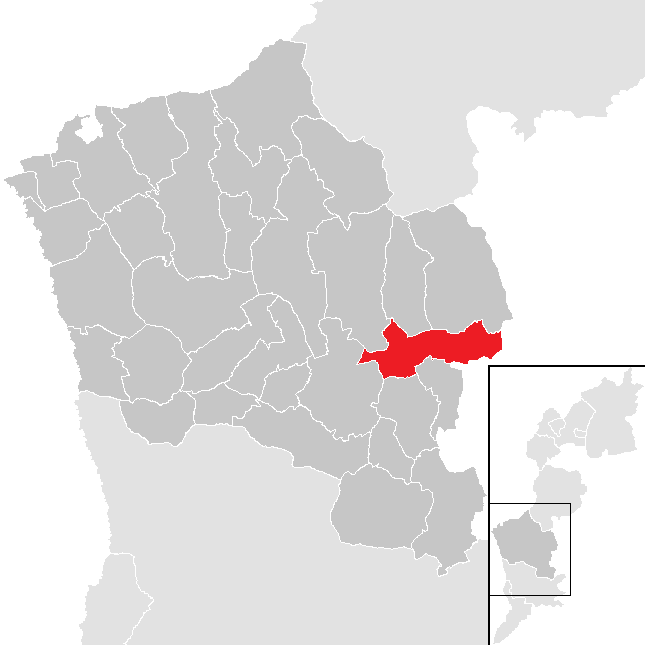
- Location within Oberwart district

- Location within Austria
- Coordinates: 47°16′N 16°26′E
- Country: Austria
- State: Burgenland
- District: Oberwart

Government
  - Mayor: Robert Marlovits (2018)

Area
  - Total: 22.32 km^{2} (8.62 sq mi)
- Elevation: 286 m (938 ft)

Population (2018-01-01)
  - Total: 765
  - Density: 34.3/km^{2} (88.8/sq mi)
- Time zone: UTC+1 (CET)
  - Summer (DST): UTC+2 (CEST)
- Postal code: 7472

Schachendorf (Croatian: Čajta, Hungarian: Csajta) is a town in the district of Oberwart in Burgenland in southeast Austria. According to the last census, 73% of the population are members of the Burgenland Croat minority, and 5% belong to the Hungarian minority.

== Geography ==
The town lies on the border to Hungary, and there is a road crossing the border from Bucsu to Schachendorf.

== Population ==
Historical population

Year	Pop.	±%
1869	1,438	—
1880	1,513	+5.2%
1890	1,649	+9.0%
1900	1,802	+9.3%
1910	1,810	+0.4%
1923	1,816	+0.3%
1934	1,731	−4.7%
1939	1,642	−5.1%
1951	1,508	−8.2%

Year	Pop.	±%
1961	1,285	−14.8%
1971	1,063	−17.3%
1981	916	−13.8%
1991	826	−9.8%
2001	812	−1.7%
2011	757	−6.8%
2021	747	−1.3%
2022	758	+1.5%

== Religion ==
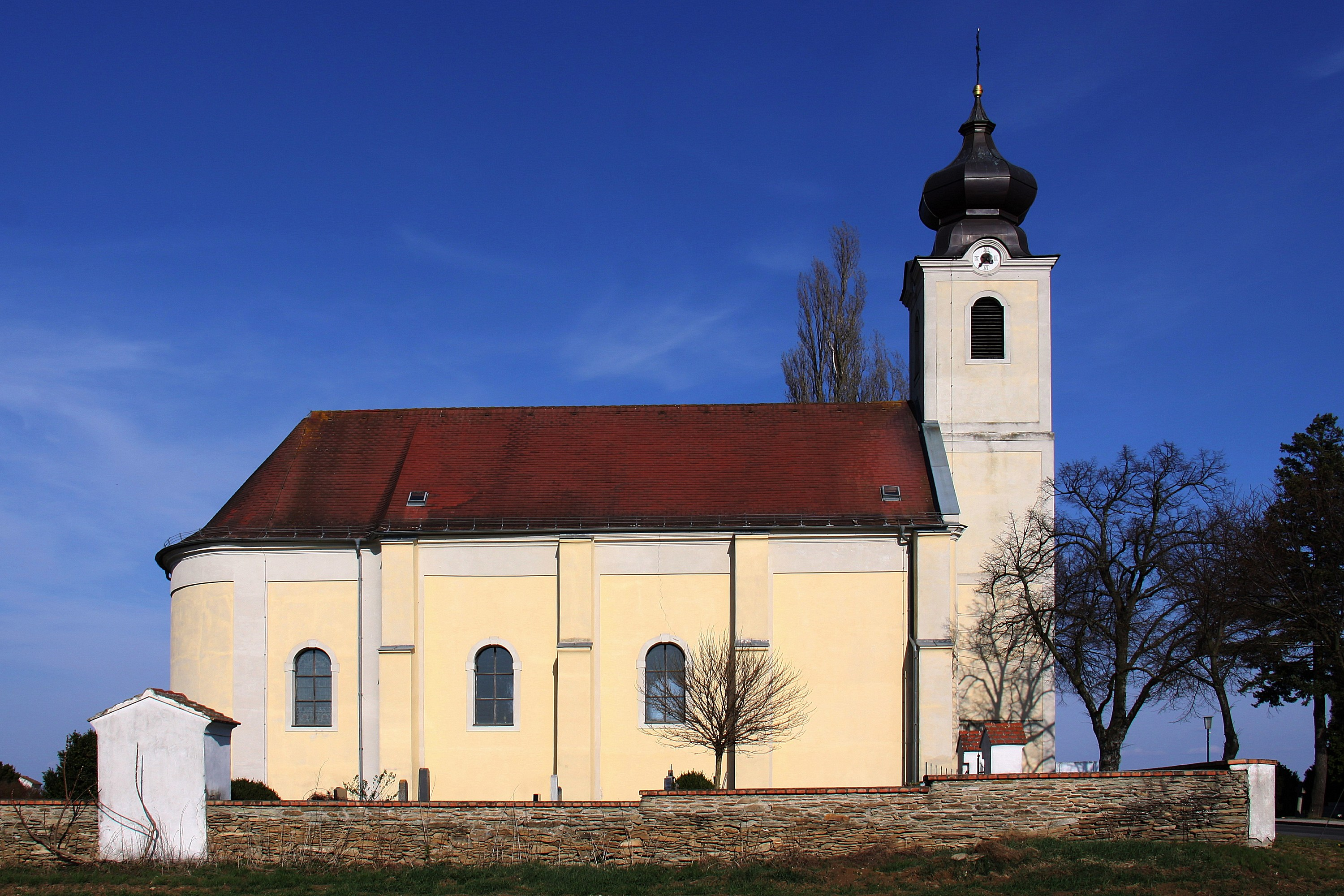
Assumption of Mary parish church

There are two Catholic parishes and parish churches: St. Martin's (de) and Assumption of Mary's (de).

== Culture ==
In 1974, local Burgenland Croats established folklore ensemble "Stalnost".
