= Kenéz =

- Village
- Flag Coat of arms

- Location of Kenéz
- Coordinates: 47.20376°N 16.79026°E
- Country: Hungary
- Region: Western Transdanubia
- County: Vas
- District: Sárvár

Area
  - Total: 7.17 km^{2} (2.77 sq mi)

Population (1 January 2026)
  - Total: 258
  - Density: 36.0/km^{2} (93.2/sq mi)
- Time zone: UTC+1 (CET)
  - Summer (DST): UTC+2 (CEST)
- Postal code: 9752
- Area code: (+36) 94
- Website: www.kenez.hu

For people with the surname, see Kenez (surname).

Kenéz is a village in Vas County, Hungary.
