= Vilonya =

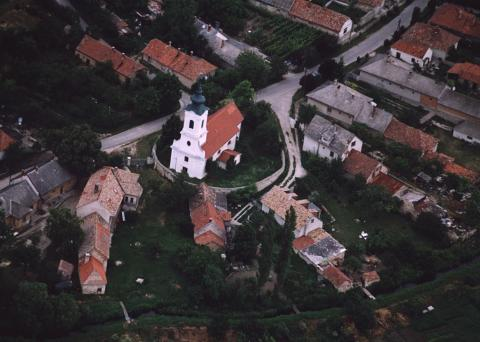
- Aerial photography of Vilonya

- Flag Coat of arms

- Location of Veszprém county in Hungary

- Location of Vilonya
- Coordinates: 47.10898°N 18.06383°E
- Country: Hungary
- County: Veszprém

Area
  - Total: 13.57 km^{2} (5.24 sq mi)

Population (2004)
  - Total: 669
  - Density: 49.29/km^{2} (127.7/sq mi)
- Time zone: UTC+1 (CET)
  - Summer (DST): UTC+2 (CEST)
- Postal code: 8194
- Area code: 88

Vilonya is a village in Veszprém county, Hungary.
