= Széll =

Széll, Szell is a Hungarian surname. The name comes as an archaic Turkic loanword with the Chuvash word "ҫил" (śil) which later became the Hungarian word "szél" meaning "wind". The name is topographic in nature, meaning "someone who lived in a spot exposed to the wind". The German equivalent is "Selle" and the English equivalent is "Sell". Széll may refer to:

- Christian Szell, a fictional character of Marathon Man
- Domonkos Széll (born 1989), Hungarian Olympic rower
- George Szell (Hungarian: Széll György; 1897, Budapest – 1970), a Jewish Hungarian-American conductor
- György Széll (politician) (1827, Makó – 1910, Makó), Hungarian politician
- György Széll (sociologist) (born 1941), Hungarian-German sociologist
- József Széll (1880 – 1956), a Hungarian politician
- Kálmán Széll de Duka et Szentgyörgyvölgy (1843, Gasztony – 1915, Rátót), a Hungarian politician, banker
  - SS Széll Kálmán
- Susanne Szell (born 1965, Bremen), German actress

== See also ==
- Szél at Wiktionary.org
