= Vácduka =

Coordinates: 47°44′48″N 19°12′36″E

- Flag Coat of arms

- Country: Hungary
- Region: Central Hungary
- County: Pest

Vácduka is a village in Pest County, Hungary.
