= Vámoscsalád =

- Interactive map of Vámoscsalád
- Coordinates: 47°23′21.91″N 16°57′55.58″E
- Region: Nyugat-Dunántúl
- County: Vas
- Subregion: Sárvári

Area
  - Total: 11.78 km^{2} (4.55 sq mi)

Population (1 January 2008)
  - Total: 366
  - Rank: Village
- Postal code: 9665
- Area code: 95
- Motorways: M86
- Distance from Budapest: 189 km (117 mi) East

Vámoscsalád is a village in Vas county, Hungary.
