= Pecöl =

- Village
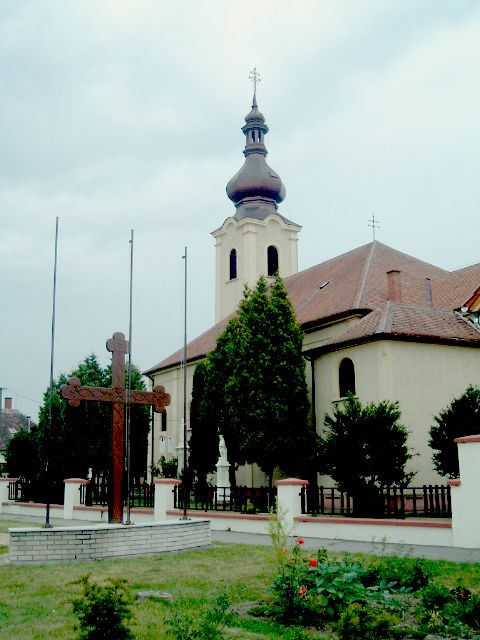

- Flag Coat of arms

- Location of Pecöl
- Coordinates: 47.20525°N 16.8202°E
- Country: Hungary
- Region: Western Transdanubia
- County: Vas
- District: Sárvár

Area
  - Total: 17.31 km^{2} (6.68 sq mi)

Population (1 January 2025)
  - Total: 743
  - Density: 42.9/km^{2} (111/sq mi)
- Time zone: UTC+1 (CET)
  - Summer (DST): UTC+2 (CEST)
- Postal code: 9754
- Area code: (+36) 95
- Website: www.pecol.hu

Pecöl is a village in Vas county, Hungary.
