= Váckisújfalu =

Coordinates: 47°42′17″N 19°20′57″E

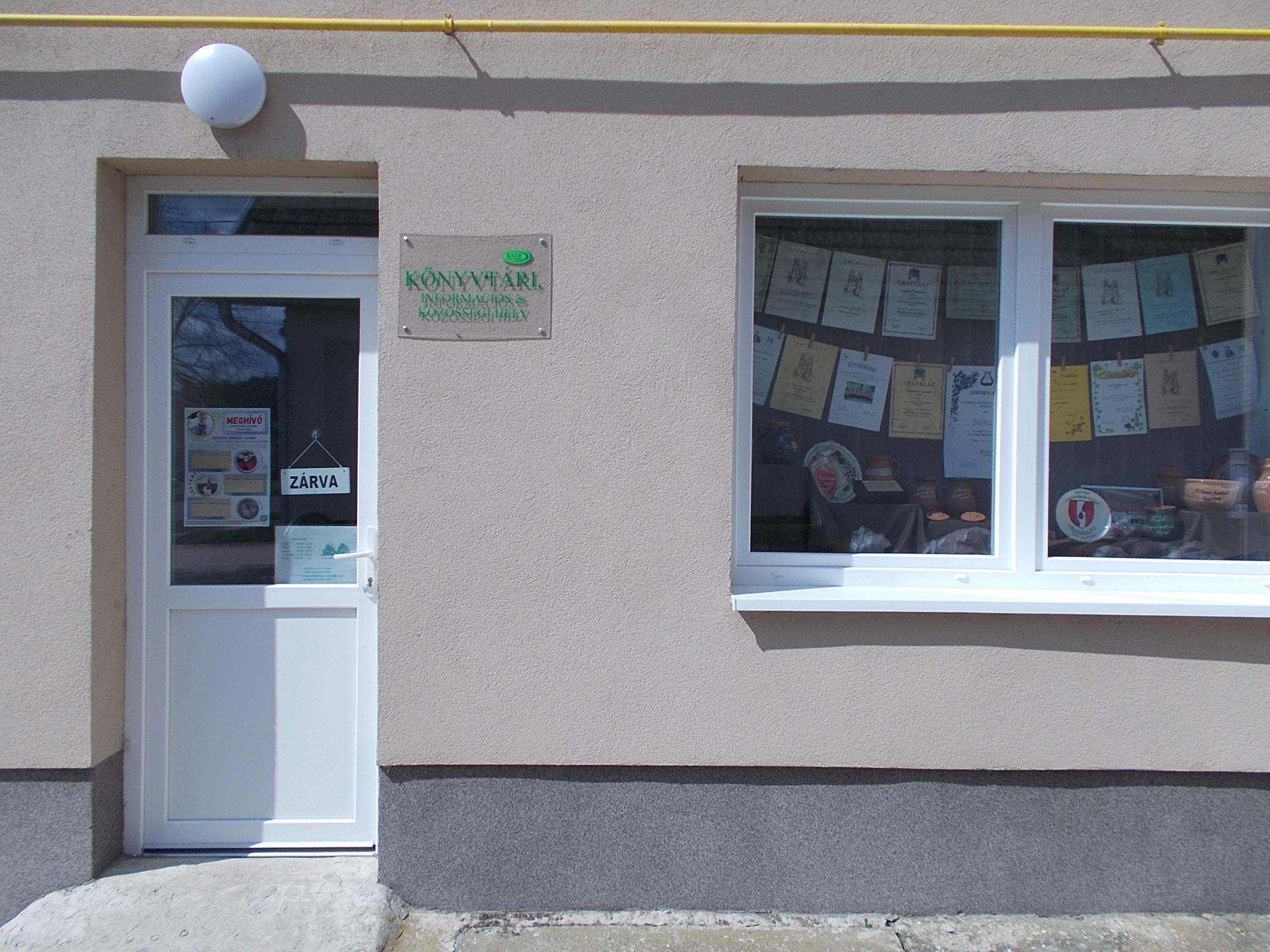
- Village hall

- Country: Hungary
- Region: Central Hungary
- County: Pest

Váckisújfalu is a village in Pest County in Hungary.
