= Szeleste =

- Location of Vas county in Hungary

- Location of Szeleste
- Coordinates: 47.31503°N 16.82814°E
- Country: Hungary
- County: Vas

Area
  - Total: 20.75 km^{2} (8.01 sq mi)

Population (2004)
  - Total: 715
  - Density: 34.45/km^{2} (89.2/sq mi)
- Time zone: UTC+1 (CET)
  - Summer (DST): UTC+2 (CEST)
- Postal code: 9622
- Area code: 95
- Motorways: M86
- Distance from Budapest: 204 km (127 mi) East

Aerial photography: Szeleste - palace

Szeleste is a village in Vas county, Hungary.
