= Gencsapáti =

- Flag Coat of arms

- Location of Gencsapáti in Hungary
- Coordinates: 47°17′05″N 16°35′44″E
- Country: Hungary
- Region: Western Transdanubia
- County: Vas
- Subregion: Szombathelyi
- Rank: Village

Area
  - Total: 22.39 km^{2} (8.64 sq mi)

Population (1 January 2008)
  - Total: 2,704
  - Density: 120.8/km^{2} (312.8/sq mi)
- Time zone: UTC+1 (CET)
  - Summer (DST): UTC+2 (CEST)
- Postal code: 9721
- Area code: +36 94
- KSH code: 24183
- Website: www.gencsapati.hu

Gencsapáti is a village in Vas county, Hungary.
