= Balogunyom =

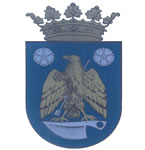
- Coat of arms

- Location of Vas county in Hungary

- Location of Balogunyom
- Coordinates: 47.15875°N 16.64559°E
- Country: Hungary
- County: Vas County

Area
  - Total: 12.12 km^{2} (4.68 sq mi)

Population (2025)
  - Total: 1,072
  - Density: 102.39/km^{2} (265.2/sq mi)
- Time zone: UTC+1 (CET)
  - Summer (DST): UTC+2 (CEST)
- Postal code: 9771
- Area code: 94

Balogunyom (Hungarian pronunciation: [ˈbɒloɡuɲom]) is a village in Vas County, Hungary.
