= Hegyfalu =

- Location of Vas county in Hungary

- Location of Hegyfalu
- Coordinates: 47.35340°N 16.88332°E
- Country: Hungary
- County: Vas

Area
  - Total: 11.89 km^{2} (4.59 sq mi)

Population (2004)
  - Total: 811
  - Density: 68.2/km^{2} (177/sq mi)
- Time zone: UTC+1 (CET)
  - Summer (DST): UTC+2 (CEST)
- Postal code: 9631
- Area code: 95
- Motorways: M86
- Distance from Budapest: 196 km (122 mi) East

Hegyfalu is a village in Vas county, Hungary.

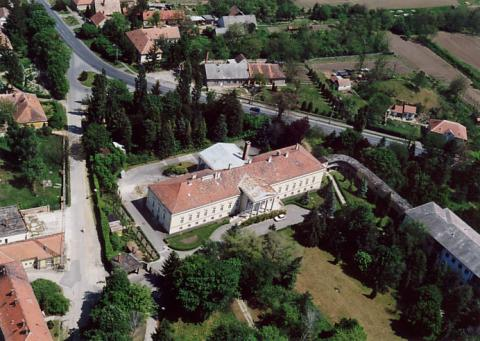
Aerial photography of Hegyfalu
