= Rábapaty =

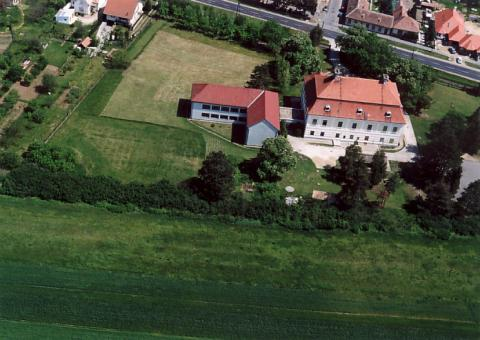

- Coat of arms

- Location of Rábapaty in Hungary
- Coordinates: 47.30202°N 16.92755°E
- Country: Hungary
- Region: Western Transdanubia
- County: Vas
- Subregion: Sárvári
- Rank: Village

Area
  - Total: 21.41 km^{2} (8.27 sq mi)

Population (1 January 2008)
  - Total: 1,755
  - Density: 81.97/km^{2} (212.3/sq mi)
- Time zone: UTC+1 (CET)
  - Summer (DST): UTC+2 (CEST)
- Postal code: 9641
- Area code: +36 95
- KSH code: 26073
- Website: www.rabapaty.hu

Rábapaty is a village in Vas county, Hungary.
