= Horvátlövő =

Horvátlövő Hrvatske Šice
- Village
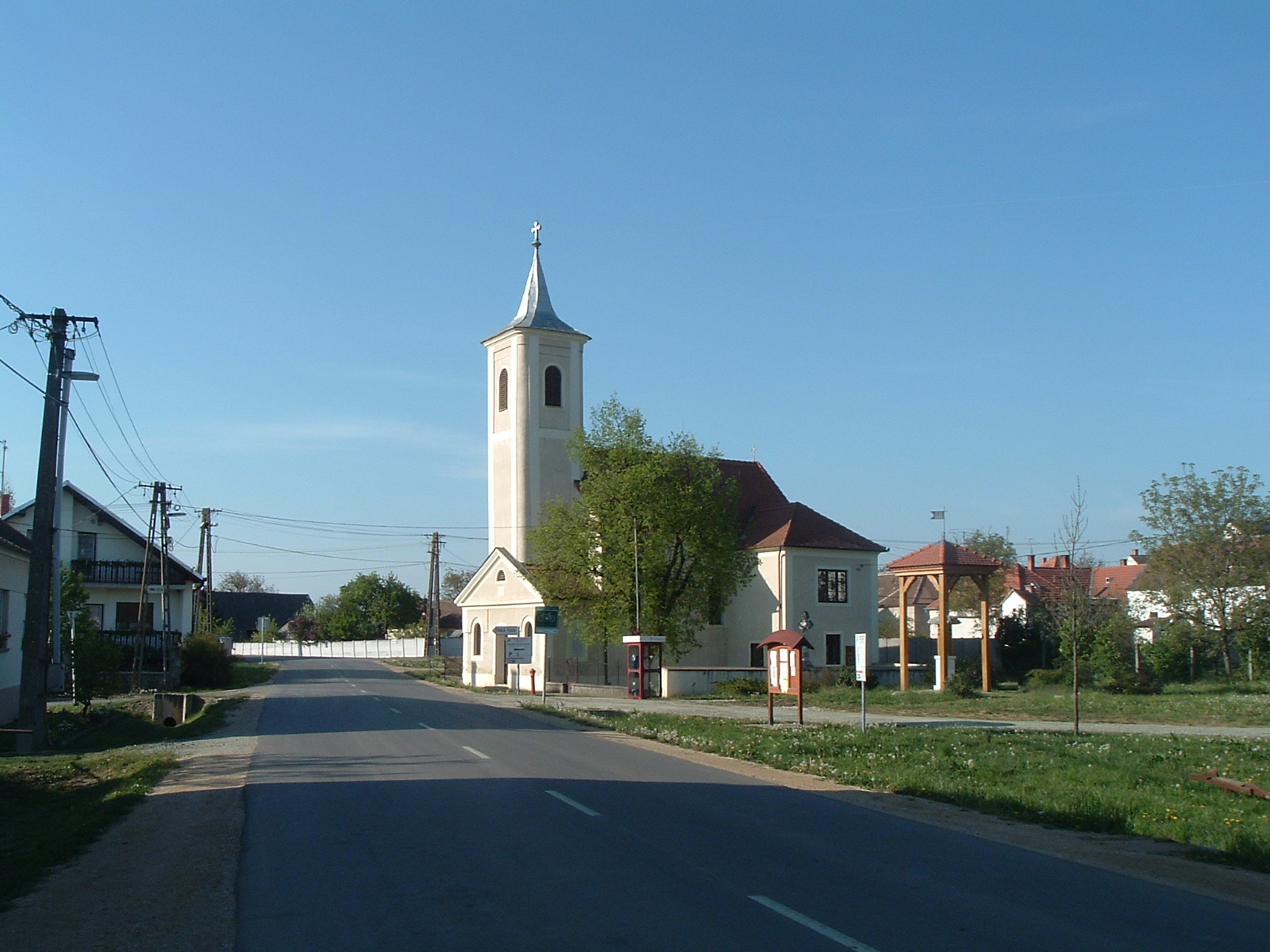

- Flag Coat of arms

- Location of Horvátlövő
- Coordinates: 47.180361°N 16.4607°E
- Country: Hungary
- Region: Western Transdanubia
- County: Vas
- District: Szombathely

Area
  - Total: 6.16 km^{2} (2.38 sq mi)

Population (1 January 2026)
  - Total: 197
  - Density: 32.0/km^{2} (82.8/sq mi)
- Time zone: UTC+1 (CET)
  - Summer (DST): UTC+2 (CEST)
- Postal code: 9796
- Area code: (+36) 94
- Website: horvatlovo.hu

Horvátlövő (Croatian: Hrvatske Šice; German: Kroatisch Schützen; lit. 'Croatian shooter(s)') is a village in Vas County, Hungary.
