= Vásárosmiske =

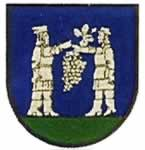
- Coat of arms

- Location of Vásárosmiske in Hungary
- Coordinates: 47°12′30.71″N 17°4′1.06″E
- Country: Hungary
- Region: Western Transdanubia
- County: Vas
- Subregion: Sárvári
- Rank: Village

Area
  - Total: 13.42 km^{2} (5.18 sq mi)

Population (1 January 2008)
  - Total: 365
  - Density: 27.2/km^{2} (70.4/sq mi)
- Time zone: UTC+1 (CET)
  - Summer (DST): UTC+2 (CEST)
- Postal code: 9552
- Area code: +36 95
- KSH code: 09195
- Website: https://vasarosmiske.hu/

Vásárosmiske is a village in Vas county, Hungary.
