= Perenye =

- Location of Vas county in Hungary

- Location of Perenye
- Coordinates: 47.29115°N 16.57470°E
- Country: Hungary
- County: Vas

Area
  - Total: 16.22 km^{2} (6.26 sq mi)

Population (2004)
  - Total: 677
  - Density: 41.73/km^{2} (108.1/sq mi)
- Time zone: UTC+1 (CET)
  - Summer (DST): UTC+2 (CEST)
- Postal code: 9722
- Area code: 94

Perenye is a village in Vas county, Hungary.
