= Vanyola =

- Flag Coat of arms

- Location of Veszprém county in Hungary

- Location of Vanyola
- Coordinates: 47.38768°N 17.59816°E
- Country: Hungary
- County: Veszprém

Area
  - Total: 19.51 km^{2} (7.53 sq mi)

Population (2004)
  - Total: 630
  - Density: 32.29/km^{2} (83.6/sq mi)
- Time zone: UTC+1 (CET)
  - Summer (DST): UTC+2 (CEST)
- Postal code: 8552
- Area code: 89

Vanyola is a village in Veszprém county, Hungary.
