= Vashosszúfalu =

- Coat of arms

- Location of Vashosszúfalu in Hungary
- Coordinates: 47°6′41.26″N 17°3′40.03″E
- Country: Hungary
- Region: Western Transdanubia
- County: Vas
- Subregion: Sárvári
- Rank: Village

Area
  - Total: 13.92 km^{2} (5.37 sq mi)

Population (1 January 2008)
  - Total: 379
  - Density: 27.2/km^{2} (70.5/sq mi)
- Time zone: UTC+1 (CET)
  - Summer (DST): UTC+2 (CEST)
- Postal code: 9674
- Area code: +36 95
- KSH code: 20349
- Website: www.vashosszufalu.hu

Vashosszúfalu is a village in Vas county, Hungary.
