= Vasszilvágy =

- Location of Vas county in Hungary

- Location of Vasszilvágy
- Coordinates: 47.29861°N 16.75416°E
- Country: Hungary
- County: Vas

Area
  - Total: 11.8 km^{2} (4.6 sq mi)

Population (2001)
  - Total: 385
  - Density: 32.63/km^{2} (84.5/sq mi)
- Time zone: UTC+1 (CET)
  - Summer (DST): UTC+2 (CEST)
- Postal code: 9747
- Area code: 94

Vasszilvágy is a village in Vas County, Hungary.

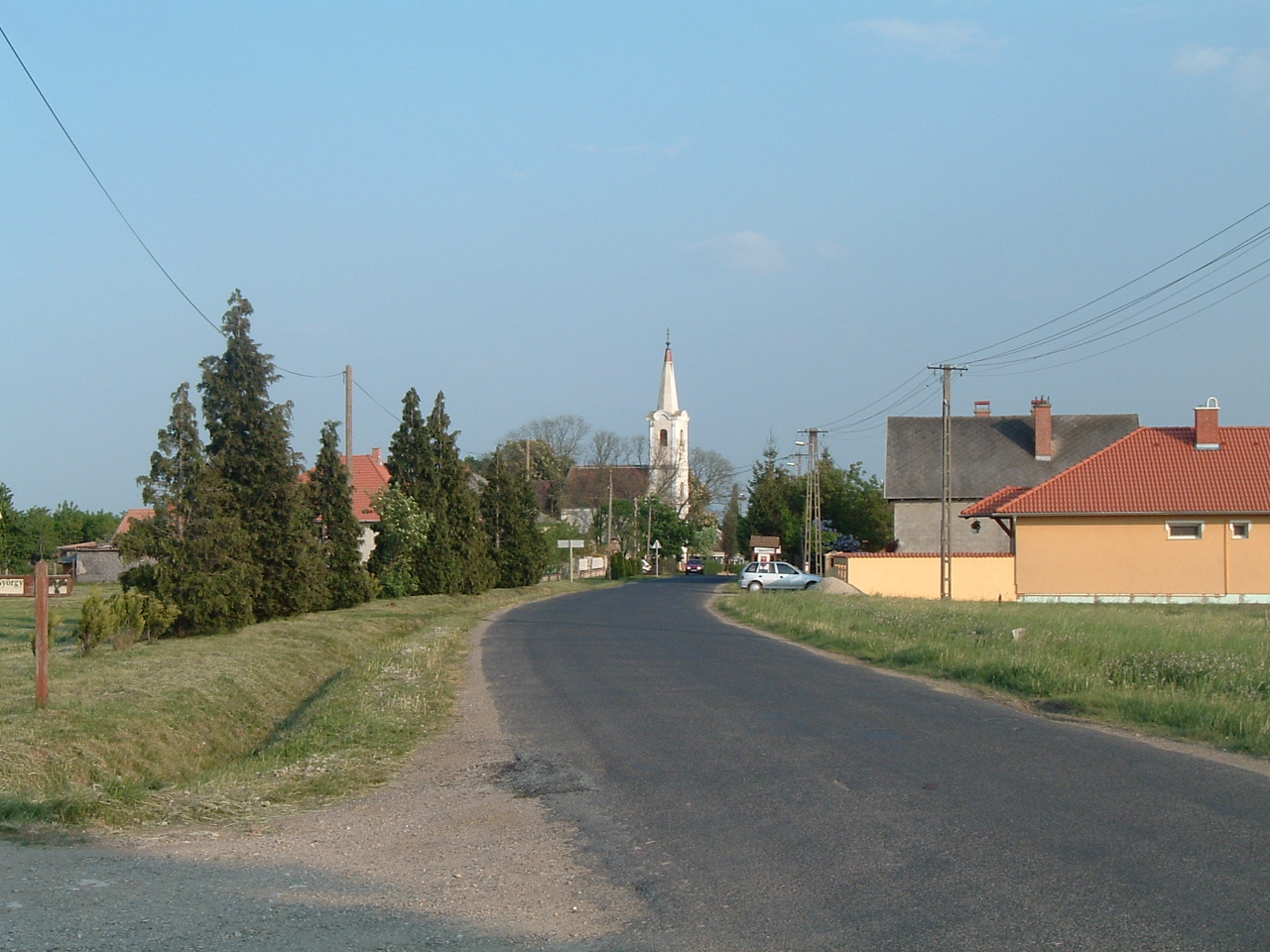
Vasszilvágy
