= Sé, Hungary =

Sé
- Location of Vas county in Hungary

- Location of Sé, Hungary
- Coordinates: 47.24290°N 16.55611°E
- Country: Hungary
- County: Vas

Area
  - Total: 6.03 km^{2} (2.33 sq mi)

Population (2018)
  - Total: 1,323
  - Density: 21,774/km^{2} (56,390/sq mi)
- Time zone: UTC+1 (CET)
  - Summer (DST): UTC+2 (CEST)
- Postal code: 9789
- Area code: 94

Sé (German: Scheibing) is a village in Vas county, in the west of Hungary, located near the border with Austria.

== Location ==
Sé is located west of Szombathely.

== Origins of name ==
The word Sé is from Hungarian séd, "brook".

== History ==
A water pipe passed here in the Roman age. Parts of water pipe have been found in the village. The population of the village was 415 in 1901.

== Landmarks ==
- The old destroyed church was built in 1660, the new church was built in 1901.
