= Vassurány =

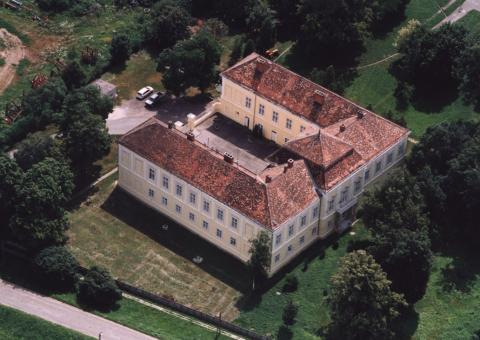

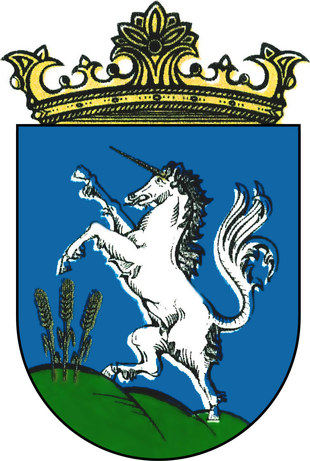
- Coat of arms

- Location of Vassurány in Hungary
- Coordinates: 47°16′56″N 16°42′07″E
- Country: Hungary
- Region: Western Transdanubia
- County: Vas
- Subregion: Szombathelyi
- Rank: Village

Area
  - Total: 10.09 km^{2} (3.90 sq mi)

Population (1 January 2008)
  - Total: 837
  - Density: 83.0/km^{2} (215/sq mi)
- Time zone: UTC+1 (CET)
  - Summer (DST): UTC+2 (CEST)
- Postal code: 9741
- Area code: +36 94
- KSH code: 25982
- Website: www.vassurany.hu

Vassurány is a village in Vas county, Hungary. with a Population of 837.
