= Vép =

- Flag Coat of arms

- Location of Vas county in Hungary

- Location of Vép
- Coordinates: 47.22749°N 16.71928°E
- Country: Hungary
- County: Vas

Area
  - Total: 32.89 km^{2} (12.70 sq mi)

Population (2015)
  - Total: 3,322
  - Density: 101.0/km^{2} (261.6/sq mi)
- Time zone: UTC+1 (CET)
  - Summer (DST): UTC+2 (CEST)
- Postal code: 9751
- Area code: 94
- Motorways: M86
- Distance from Budapest: 217 km (135 mi) East

Vép is a town in Vas county, Hungary.

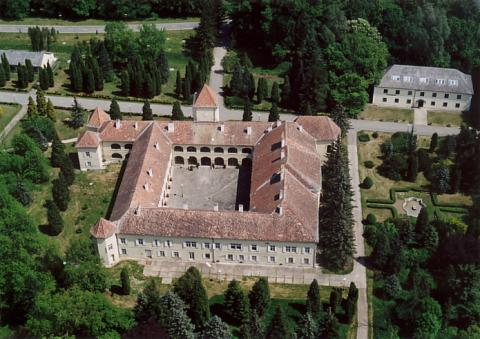
Vép, Erdődy palace from above
