= Vát =

- Location of Vas county in Hungary

- Location of Vát
- Coordinates: 47.27999°N 16.77731°E
- Country: Hungary
- County: Vas

Area
  - Total: 23.27 km^{2} (8.98 sq mi)

Population (2004)
  - Total: 697
  - Density: 29.95/km^{2} (77.6/sq mi)
- Time zone: UTC+1 (CET)
  - Summer (DST): UTC+2 (CEST)
- Postal code: 9748
- Area code: 94
- Motorways: M86
- Distance from Budapest: 209 km (130 mi) East

Vát is a village in Vas county, Hungary.
