= Narda, Hungary =

Narda Narda
- Location of Vas county in Hungary

- Location of Narda, Hungary
- Coordinates: 47.2391°N 16.45655°E
- Country: Hungary
- County: Vas

Area
  - Total: 10.35 km^{2} (4.00 sq mi)

Population (2004)
  - Total: 514
  - Density: 49.66/km^{2} (128.6/sq mi)
- Time zone: UTC+1 (CET)
  - Summer (DST): UTC+2 (CEST)
- Postal code: 9793
- Area code: 94

Narda (Croatian: Narda) is a village in Vas County, Hungary.
