= Vaskeresztes =

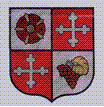
- Coat of arms

- Location of Vas county in Hungary

- Location of Vaskeresztes
- Coordinates: 47.19364°N 16.44746°E
- Country: Hungary
- County: Vas

Area
  - Total: 9.12 km^{2} (3.52 sq mi)

Population (2004)
  - Total: 351
  - Density: 38.48/km^{2} (99.7/sq mi)
- Time zone: UTC+1 (CET)
  - Summer (DST): UTC+2 (CEST)
- Postal code: 9795
- Area code: 94

Vaskeresztes (German: Großdorf) is a village in Vas County, Hungary.
