= Torony =

- Location of Vas county in Hungary

- Location of Torony
- Coordinates: 47.23626°N 16.53706°E
- Country: Hungary
- County: Vas

Area
  - Total: 12.83 km^{2} (4.95 sq mi)

Population (2004)
  - Total: 1,591
  - Density: 124/km^{2} (320/sq mi)
- Time zone: UTC+1 (CET)
  - Summer (DST): UTC+2 (CEST)
- Postal code: 9791
- Area code: 94

Torony (lit. "tower") is a village in Vas county, Hungary.
