= Albert Wass =

Hungarian writer (1908–1998)

Count Albert Wass
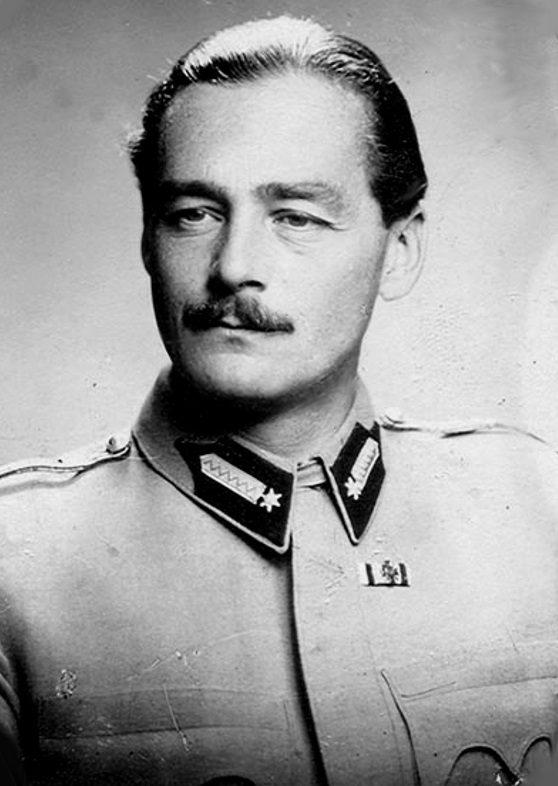
- Wass c. 1943
- Born: January 8, 1908; Válaszút, Austria-Hungary (now Răscruci, Romania)
- Died: February 17, 1998 (aged 90); Astor Park, Florida, U.S.
- Occupations: Poet; writer
- Employer: University of Florida
- Spouses: Éva Siemers; Elisabeth McClain
- Children: 6
- Awards: Baumgarten Prize (1934, 1940)

Albert Wass Coat of arms

Count Albert Wass de Szentegyed et Czege (Hungarian: gróf szentegyedi és cegei Wass Albert; January 8, 1908 – February 17, 1998) was a Hungarian nobleman, forest engineer, novelist, poet, member of the Wass de Czege family.

Wass was born in Válaszút, Austria-Hungary (now Răscruci, Cluj County, Romania) in 1908. In 1944, he fled from Hungary and then joined the fleeing forces of the Third Reich and ended up in Germany, then emigrated to the U.S. after World War II. He was condemned as a war criminal by the Romanian People's Tribunals, however, United States authorities refused to extradite Wass to Romania claiming the lack of solid evidence.

The works of Albert Wass first gained recognition within Hungarian literature from Transylvania in the 1940s. In 1944, he moved to Germany and later in 1952 to the United States and lived there until his 1998 death in Astor Park, Florida. During the communist regime, his books were banned both in Hungary and in Romania. Part of his works was published in Hungary after the change of political system in 1989, however, before this time, his works were unknown to the Hungarian public.

He was popular among the Hungarian minority in Romania and has growing popularity in Hungary. In 2005, in a public assessment (Nagy Könyv), he was found to be one of the most popular Hungarian authors: his book "A funtineli boszorkány" (The Witch of Funtinel) was named the 12th most popular book; two more books were named in the top 50 ranking, including the family saga "Kard és kasza" (Sword and Scythe).

== Family ==
The Wass family has traced its descent from the age of Árpád, and is one of the oldest noble families in Transylvania. The family received the title of count from Maria Theresia in 1744.

His grandfather, Béla Wass, was a parliamentarian and Lord Lieutenant (főispán) of Szolnok-Doboka county. His father was Count Endre Wass (1886–1975), his mother Baroness Ilona Bánffy de Losonc (1883–1960).

He has six sons: Vid Wass de Czege, Csaba Wass de Czege, Huba Wass de Czege, Miklós Wass de Czege, Geza Wass de Czege and Endre (Andreas) Wass von Czege.

His great-grandson, Jacob Roberts, teaches history at Florida State University Schools.

== Youth ==
Albert Wass was born in Válaszút (today Răscruci) at the Bánffy mansion of Válaszút, distinct from the nearby Bánffy castle of Bonchida. His parents divorced early, and he was mostly brought up by his grandfather, Béla Wass. He graduated from the Reformed Church Secondary School in Cluj on Farkas Street and subsequently earned a diploma in forestry from the Academy of Economics in Debrecen, Hungary. He continued his studies of forestry and horticulture in Hohenheim, Germany, and Sorbonne, Paris, where he received additional diplomas. He returned to Transylvania in 1932, as his father fell ill. He had to attend obligatory military service in the Romanian Army and later settled to run the family estate in the Transylvanian Plain.

His first wife was his cousin Baroness Éva Siemers (1914–1991) of Hamburg. "Due to pressure from my family, I had to marry my cousin in 1935 (...) this was the only way to avoid bankruptcy of the family lands", Wass wrote later.

He had six children (Vid, Csaba, Huba, Miklós, Géza, Endre); Csaba died at age three. Huba Wass de Czege, born in 1941 in Kolozsvár (now Cluj-Napoca, Romania) had a significant career in the U.S. Army, achieving the rank of brigadier general. He is known as a principal designer of the "AirLand Battle" military doctrine and took part in the planning of Desert Storm against Iraq in 1991.

Wass started to write poems, short stories, and articles. His first books were published in 1927 and 1929 in Cluj. In 1934, his novel Farkasverem (Wolfpit) was published by the Transylvanian Guild of Arts. In 1935, he was accepted member of the Transylvanian Guild of Arts, and at the same time he was the first young Transylvanian to be awarded the Baumgarten Prize.

After the Second Vienna Award (30 August 1940), northern Transylvania was reassigned to Hungary, so in 1941, Wass was nominated as the primary forest monitor in the Ministry of Agriculture for the area near Dés (now Dej).

== During World War II ==
From May 1942, he took part in military training with the Hungarian Cavalry as a reserve officer, achieving rank of ensign. In his memoirs, Wass claims to have become chief editor of Ellenzék in May 1943, as his boss was drafted into the army. He writes:

two soldiers of Gestapo entered the editorial, showing the order they have to monitor the newspaper. I simply left the building, and walked up the mountains. Two weeks later, my father sent me a message that the Germans are looking for me. To avoid conflict, General Veress, the commander of military troops in North Transylvania has given me a uniform, and as master sergeant he sent me to Ukraine with 9th Hungarian Cavalry, from which I returned only at Christmas.

Wass became the aide-de-camp of General Lajos Veress in 1944. As the war was drawing to an end and the Soviet (and later Romanian) troops were drawing forward into Transylvania, as an officer, he did not wait for the occupation of North Transylvania, but on Easter 1945, crossed the border and chose emigration.

== World War II sentence for war crimes ==
In May 1946, both Albert Wass and his father, Endre Wass, were sentenced to death in absentia by a Romanian tribunal for ordering the killing of Romanian peasants from Sucutard and Mureșenii de Câmpie and their possessions were confiscated, by the Romanian People's Tribunal, a tribunal set up by the post-World War II government of Romania, overseen by the Allied Control Commission to trial suspected war criminals, in line with Article 14 of the Armistice Agreement with Romania. The tribunal were to a large extent set up on the model of the Nürnberg International Tribunal. The two were accused for events that happened in September 1940, when the Hungarian forces marched into North Transylvania, when a Hungarian lieutenant, Pakucs, arrested six inhabitants (a Romanian priest and his family, his Hungarian servant, also Romanian peasants, and a local Jewish merchant and his family) of Sucutard (Szentgothárd), and then shot to death two Romanian men and two Jewish women, Eszter and Róza Mihály in Ţaga (Czege), at the order of Albert and Endre Wass, when they allegedly attempted to escape. Albert Wass was also accused for, as the alleged instigator, for the shootings at Mureşenii de Câmpie (Omboztelke), when Hungarian soldiers, led by Lieutenant Gergely Csordás, killed 11 Jews. Wass defended himself as not present at the killings.

Since 1979, National-Communist Romanian authorities tried several times to have him extradited to Romania, referring to a verdict by Romanian People's Tribunals from 1946 based on false testimony, after several revisions, the U.S. Department of Justice refused several times the petition of Ceaușescu due to lack of evidence. This was confirmed even after the Wiesenthal Center denounced him, as his name was on the list of war criminals living in the U.S. After the analysis of the case, the U.S. dropped the charges against the retired language professor of the University of Florida. Wass said Romanian Communists were trying to frame him because of his strong Hungarian nationalist position. Wass continued to insist that he had nothing to do with the killings, and claimed he was the victim of a "Zionist-Romanian" conspiracy. Wass said "I can't quite see how anybody can be a war criminal and not get caught in 30 years. Especially somebody who is always in the limelight like I am."

In 2008, his son, Andreas Wass, appealed to the Romanian courts to annul the sentence, but the Romanian courts found that no new evidence was presented and as such, the sentence was upheld.

== Emigration ==
First traveling to Sopron, he then moved onward to Bleichbach and Hamburg, Germany, and lived there till 1951, where the family of his first wife, Éva Siemers, had been living. He found a job as a nightwatchman at a construction site.

In 1951, Wass emigrated to the United States, together with four of his sons (Vid, Huba, Miklós, and Géza). Due to pulmonary disease, his wife was unable to receive approval for emigration from the US administration and was subsequently left behind in Germany with their other son Endre. The couple later divorced.

In 1952, he married Elizabeth McClain (1905–1987) Elizabeth was the daughter of WG McClain and Florence McClain of Bellaire Ohio both respectively Irish and English immigrants. Elizabeth's family consisted of four children to three girls two boys Carolyn Rose Joseph and John we're her siblings she also had children from a previous relationship two girls and a boy.

Wass founded the American Hungarian Guild of Arts, managing its academic work and publishing activities, and editing its newsletter. He launched his own publishing house, the Danubian Press, which published not only books but English language magazines of the American Hungarian Guild of Arts, too. The Transylvanian Quarterly dealing with Transylvania and related issues, then the Hungarian Quarterly undertaking the general problems of the Hungarian nation became the most important anti-Bolshevik forum of Hungarian exiles.

Albert Wass claimed several times, the Securitate, the National-Communist Romanian secret police, made several attempts to intimidate, and even trying to assassinate him. In the 1970s, there were several assassination attempts against the writer by Securitate agents, whose bullet marks from their weapons Albert Wass was able to show even during the reportage film shot with him in 1996. The two assassins were caught by the U.S. police, but since they had Romanian diplomatic passports, they were released. In the autumn of 1985, the Securitate committed an assassination attempt against Wass Albert at the Holiday Inn Hotel in Cleveland, which was foiled only because of Interpol's information and crime prevention work. Albert Wass received a notification from Interpol that Ceaușescu had sent 12 Securitate agents as diplomats to the embassy in Washington and the consulate in Cleveland. Albert Wass claimed: "One of their tasks is to put me off my feet", he said a representative of the FBI office in Florida informed him that an assassination attempt was being planned in Cleveland, and asked him not to go to the event of the Transylvanian day. Two days later, a truck hit him, two days later the vehicle was found and it had a diplomatic license plate, the truck belonged to the Romanian Embassy. At the request of the FBI, Albert Wass made a reservation at the Holiday Inn Hotel. The evening before their performance, two people from the Romanian Consulate were caught, disguised as TV technicians, entering the room reserved for Wass with a fake key and trying to plant a bomb there. As they had diplomatic immunity, they were expelled the country.

The Hungarian Congress in Cleveland established the Transylvanian World Federation in 1975, two co-presidents were elected: Albert Wass and István Zolcsák. Their work was to presenting and representing Transylvania's cause to the world. They published the historical work "Documented Facts and Figures on Transylvania" in 1977, according to Wass "to explain and defend the truth of Transylvania." These things also contributed to the fact that, due to Romania's human rights policies the United States State Department discontinued Romania's most-favored-nation trade status in 1988. Ceaușescu called Wass "The number one public enemy of Romania" in the Bucharest radio in 1988, Albert Wass wrote about this to Zita Szeleczky: "I have never received a greater honor in my life!"

On 20 August 1993, he was awarded the Commander's Cross of the Hungarian Order of Merit by president Árpád Göncz according to the proposal of prime minister József Antall, received the next year from the Hungarian consul of Florida and Sándor Csoóri at his home.

Wass's application for naturalization in Hungary was first refused by the government between 1994 and 1998, as his death sentence in Hungary had not been revoked, then impeded by a reply that the naturalization certificate of the 90-year-old author would have been valid for only a year from the date of issue.

Wass committed suicide on February 17, 1998, at age 90 in his Florida residence after a long struggle with a medical condition. His final wish was to have his remains placed in the garden of Kemény villa in Brâncoveneşti, Mureș County, next to the tomb of author János Kemény.

According to his fourth son, Miklós Wass, no suicidal tendencies were noticed in his father.

== Citizenship and rehabilitation attempts ==
It was a long debate in the Hungarian press about the fact that Albert Wass has not received Hungarian citizenship, in spite of his several applications, the explanation given being that he had again become a Romanian citizen after the 1946 Paris Peace Conference.

In 2007, Hungarian members of parliament István Simicskó (KDNP, Christian Democrats) and Mihály Babák (Fidesz, Young Democrats) have asked president László Sólyom to grant Albert Wass citizenship posthumously, but were replied that this is not possible for several reasons, for example, he had already received citizenship in 1997, so the writer has died as Hungarian,, however, the certificate of citizenship (but not the citizenship itself) was valid only for one year and he refused it as being offensive.

In recent years, some representatives of the Hungarian minority in Romania and his family attempted his rehabilitation. His son's request for a retrial of the case was rejected by the Romanian High Court of Cassation and Justice in 2007.

His life has never been examined thoroughly in court, so as a consequence it is a predominant view among Romanians that Albert Wass is a criminal, responsible for the murdering of Romanians and Jews and his condemnation by the Tribunal is just. The rehabilitation attempts are seen as immoral particularly by relatives of those he was accused of murdering.

On May 22, 2004, a statue was unveiled in Odorheiu Secuiesc bearing no name, only the Hungarian inscription "Vándor Székely" (Wandering Szekler). The sculpture was interpreted in the Romanian press as being of Albert Wass. Two statues of Wass have been moved to the interior of the Hungarian churches in Reghin and Lunca Mureșului.

Although Romanian law forbids the cult of those condemned for "offence against peace and mankind or promoting fascist, racist or xenophobe ideology", some Romanian localities predominantly inhabited by Hungarian ethnics still retain commemorative statues of Albert Wass. They argue the Supreme Prosecutor's Office of Romania on 21 June 2004 in written declared – in another trial -:

"Regarding the analysis of the relevant international laws applied for war crimes and offence against peace and mankind that also Romania ratified (Geneva Conventions 12. 08. 1949 – "...") the conclusion is the activities of Albert Wass convict are not belonging to those crimes that are summarized in these international conventions. Conclusion: "..." Albert Wass was not condemned for offence against peace and mankind"

In another trial, a person was charged because he put a statue in his own yard in Sovata. Finally, he was released from the charge, and the authorities were obligated to restore the statue to its original place.

Albert Wass also has commemorative statues in several localities in Hungary, where he is considered by some on the Right to be a hero and a victim of the regime.

The representatives of the ruling Fidesz party and the radical nationalist Jobbik party together voted in early 2011 that several public squares be named after him in Budapest.

The works of Albert Wass is part of the Hungarian national curriculum (NAT) since 2012. And since 2020 the writer appears even more prominently in the compulsory curriculum, it includes the "Adjátok vissza a hegyeimet" novel.

== Statues ==
Albert Wass has more than 60 public statues.

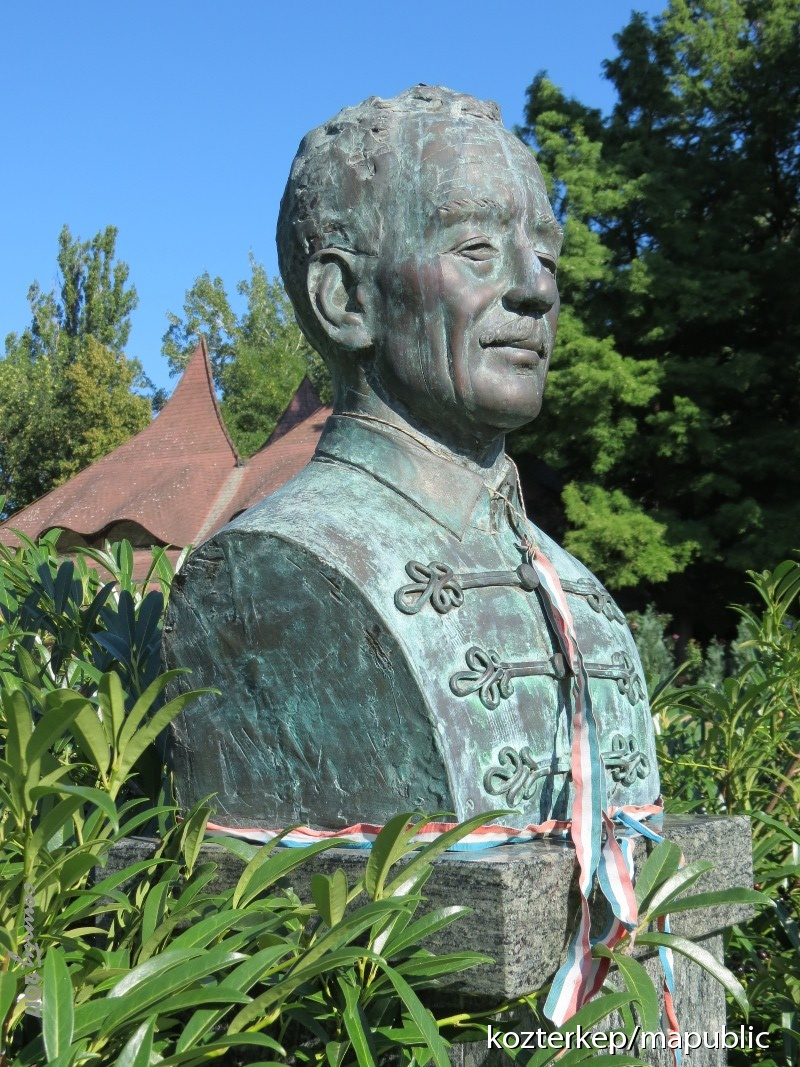
Albert Wass statue in Szarvas, Hungary (2007)

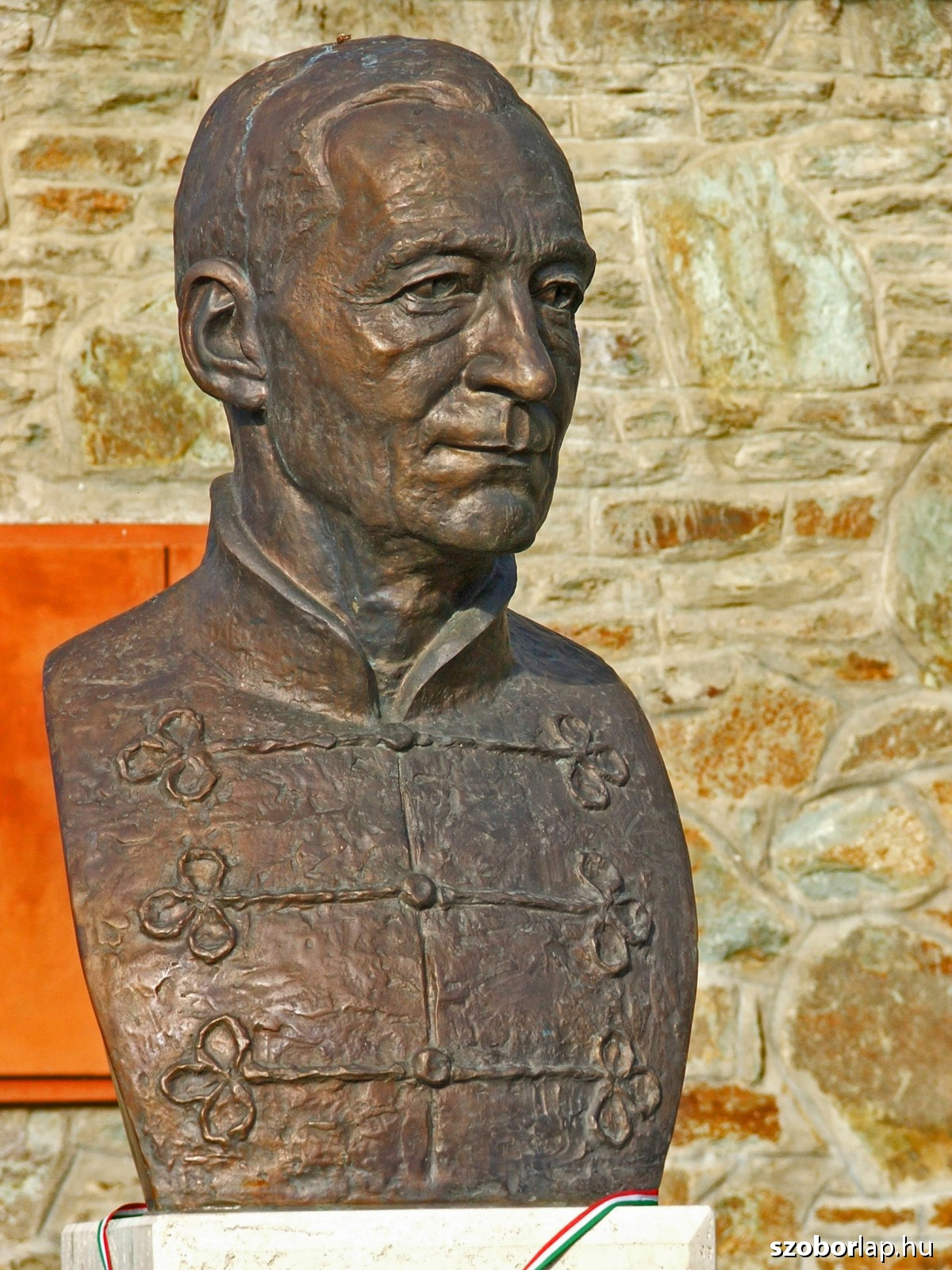
Albert Wass statue in Szarvas, Hungary (2006)

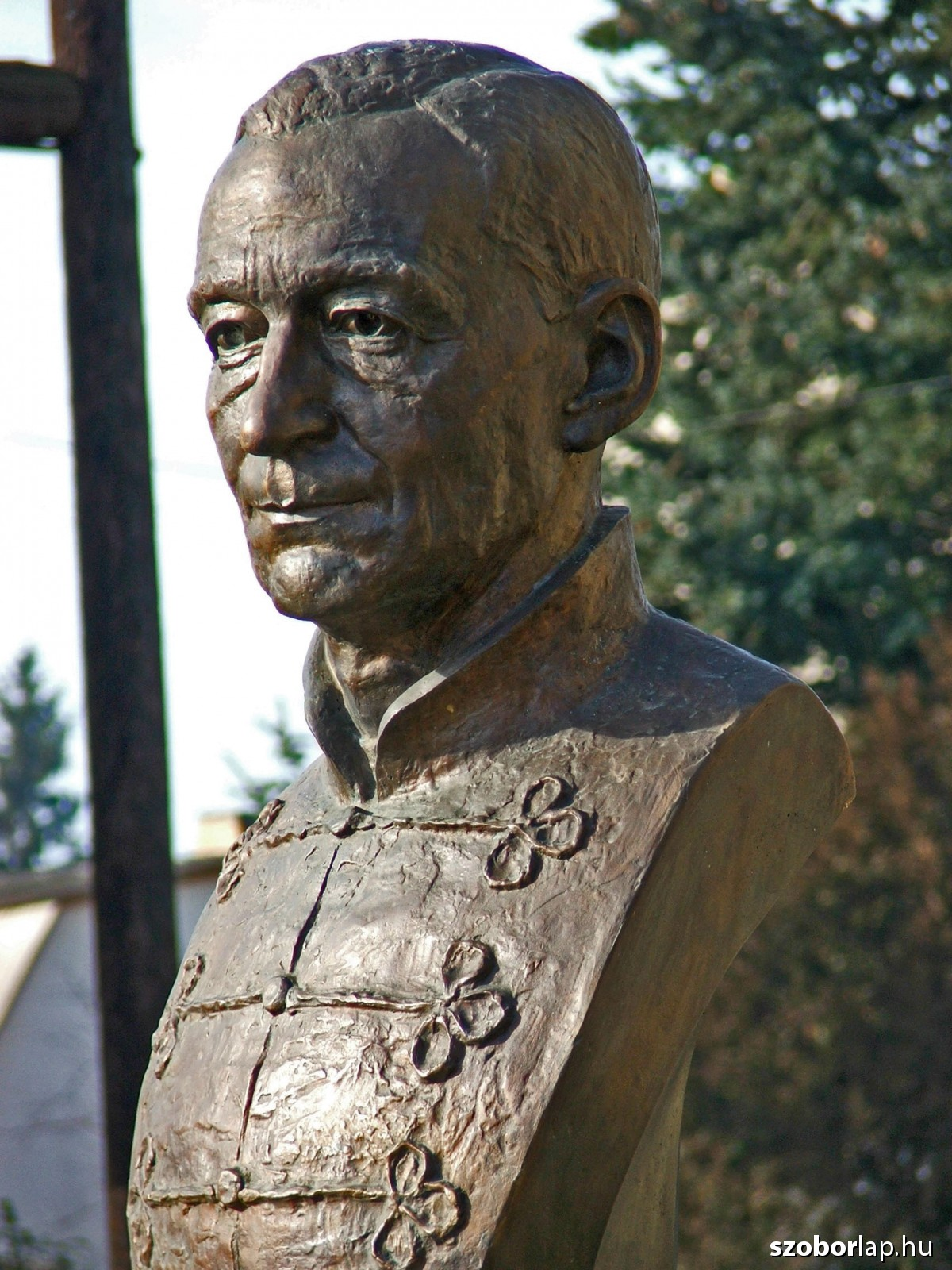
Albert Wass statue in Szarvas, Hungary (2006)

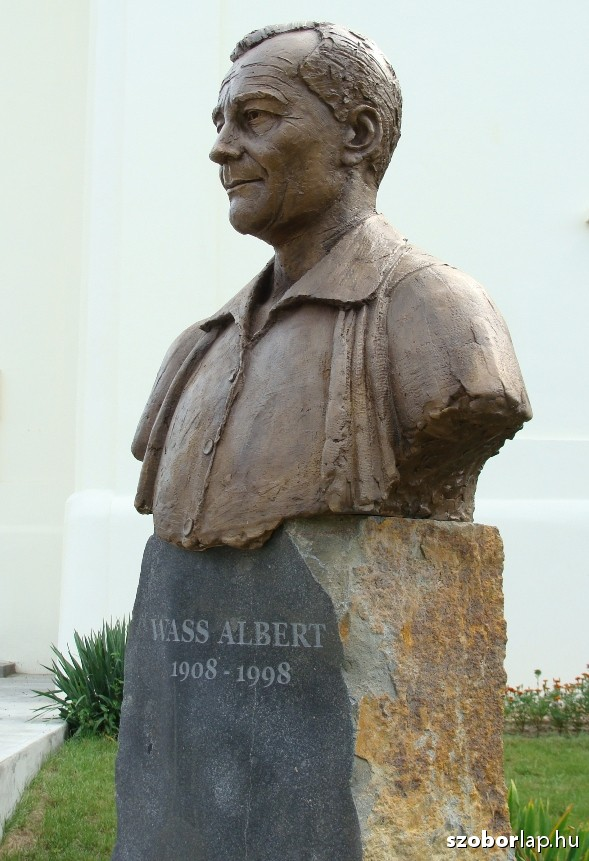
Albert Wass statue in Törökszentmiklós, Hungary (2010)

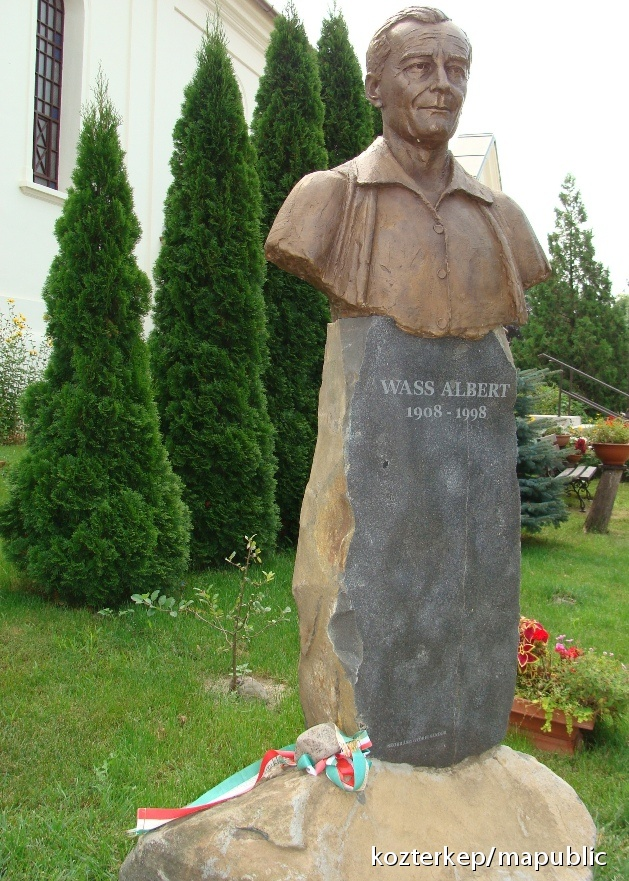
Albert Wass statue in Törökszentmiklós, Hungary (2010)

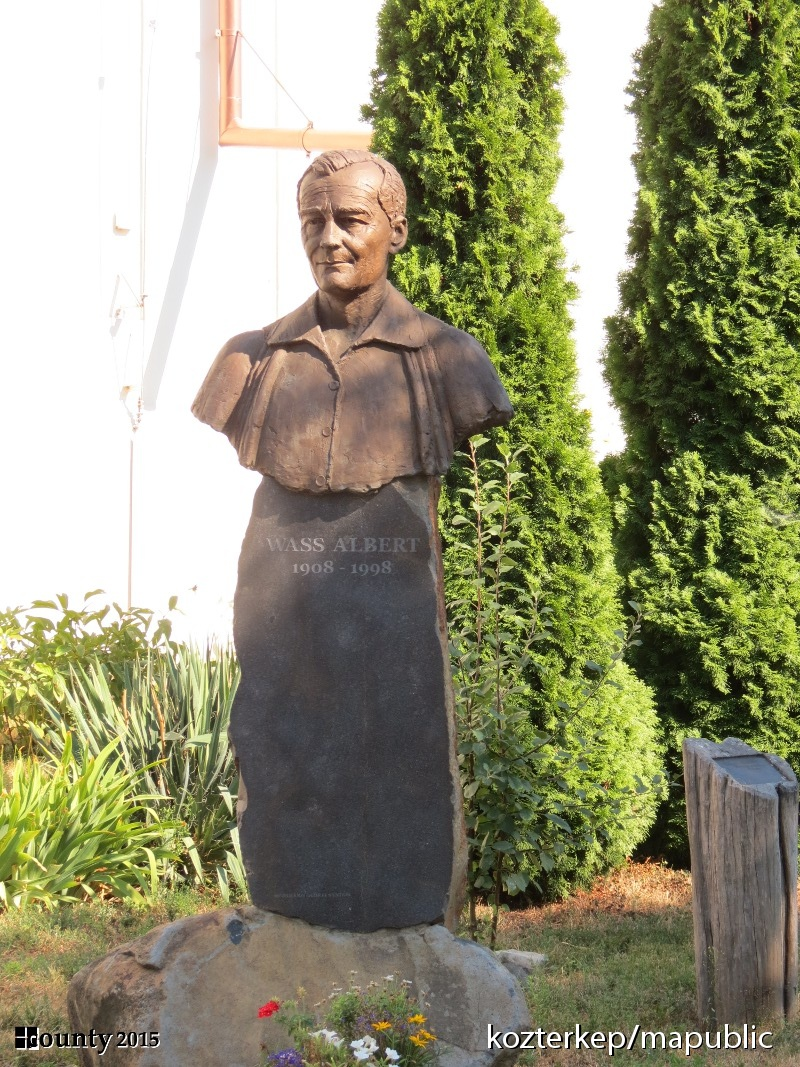
Albert Wass statue in Törökszentmiklós, Hungary (2010)

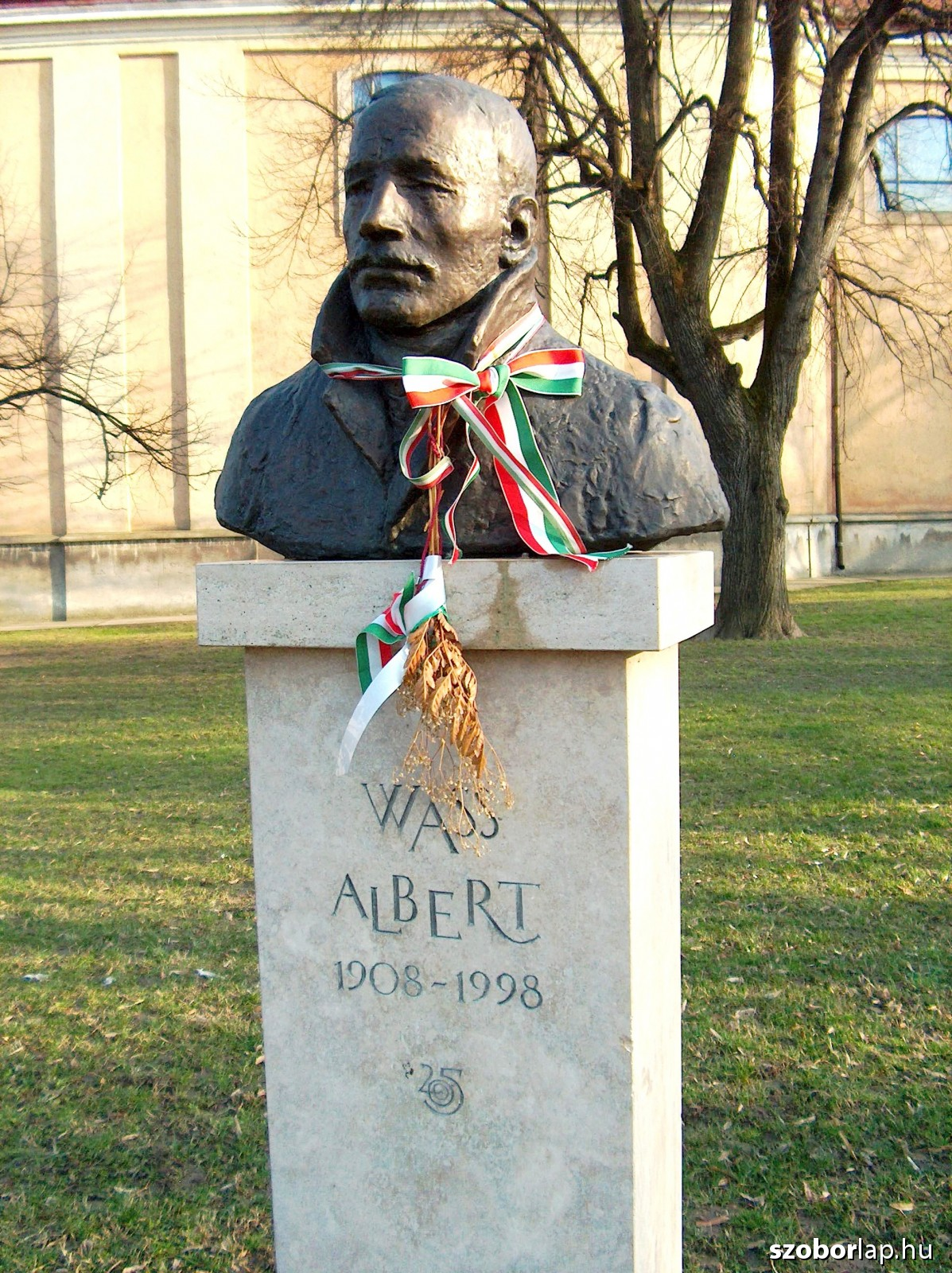
Albert Wass statue in Solymár, Hungary (2005)

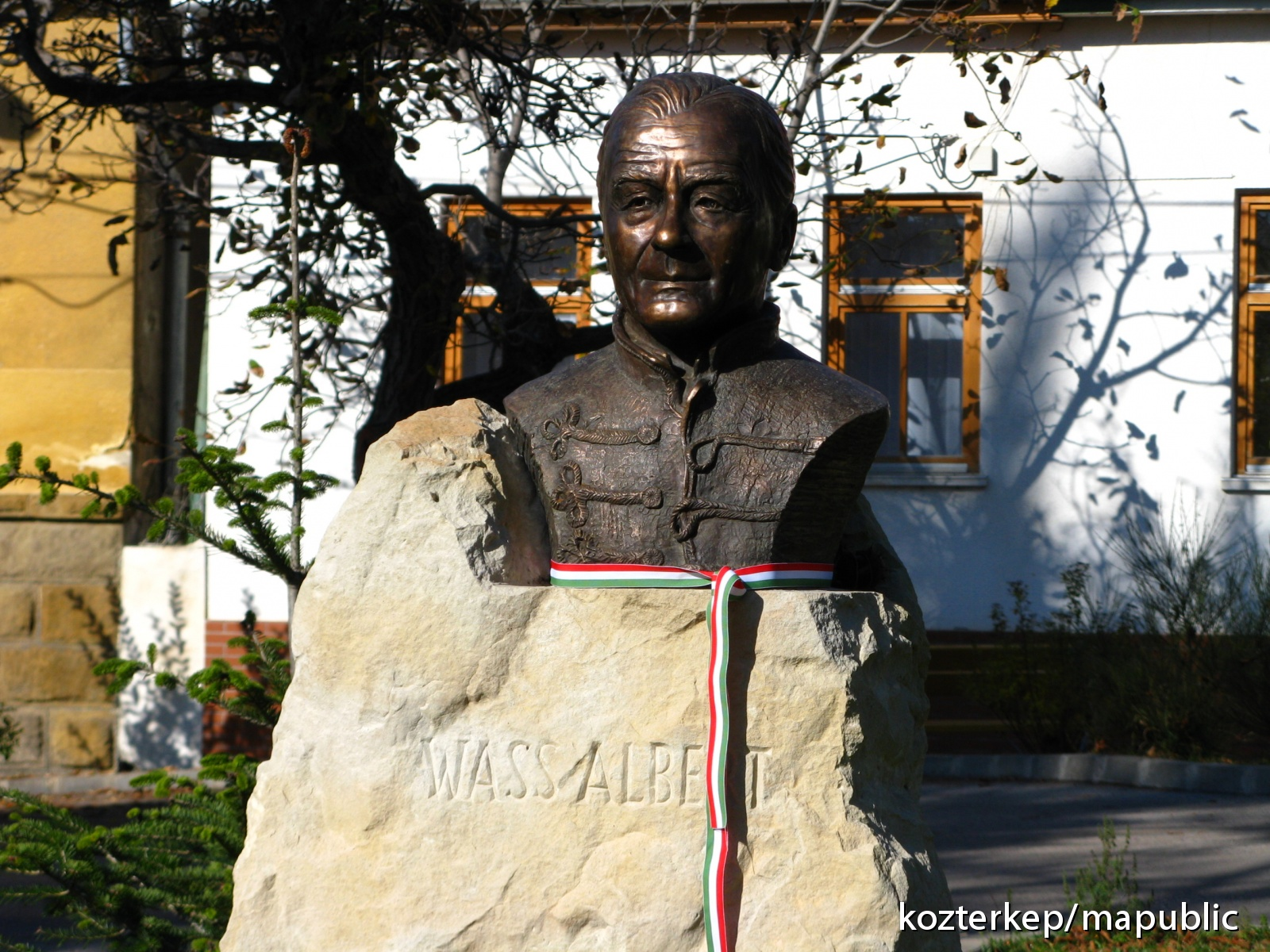
Albert Wass statue in Budakeszi, Hungary (2008)

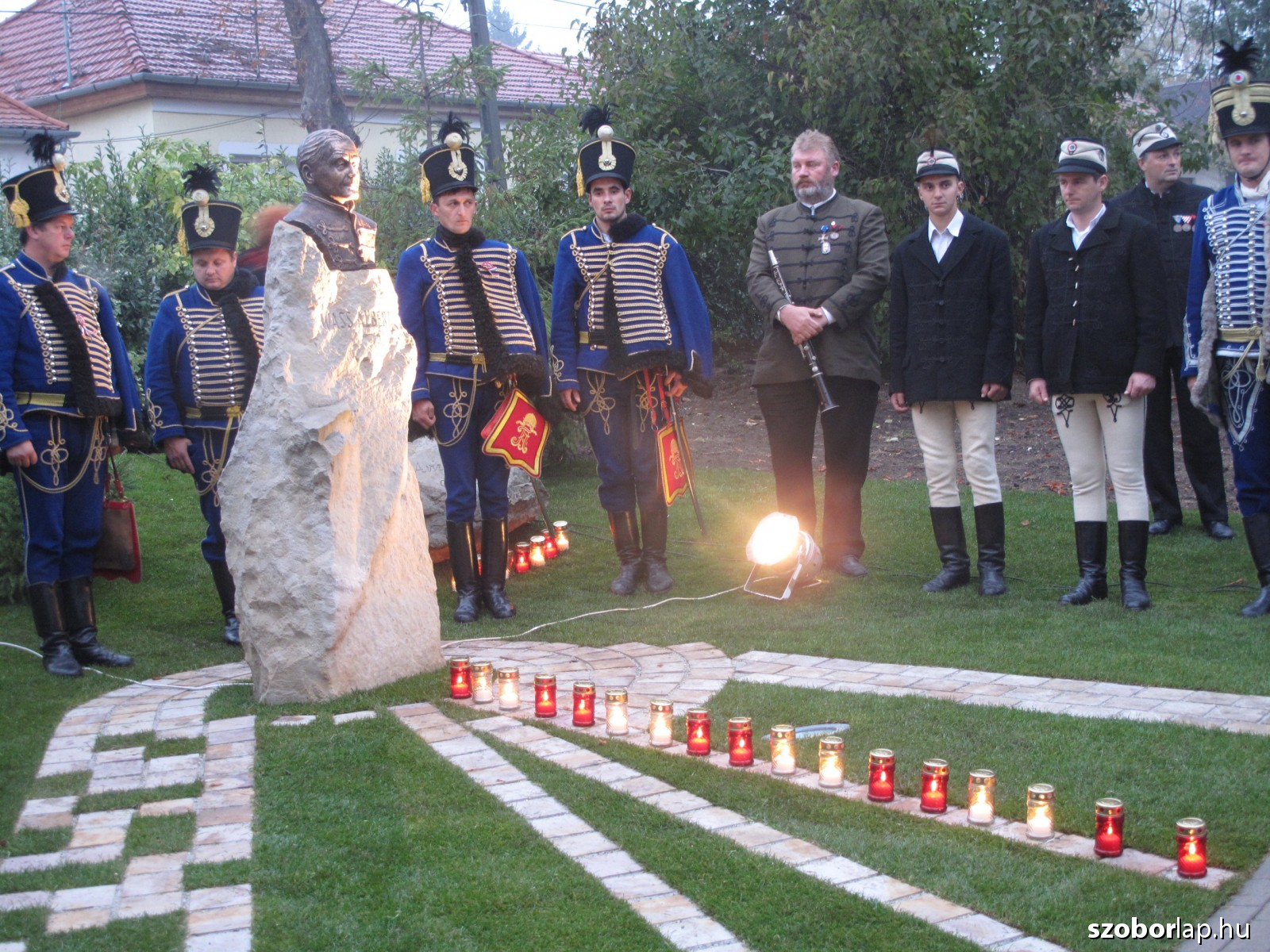
Albert Wass statue in Budakeszi, Hungary (2008)

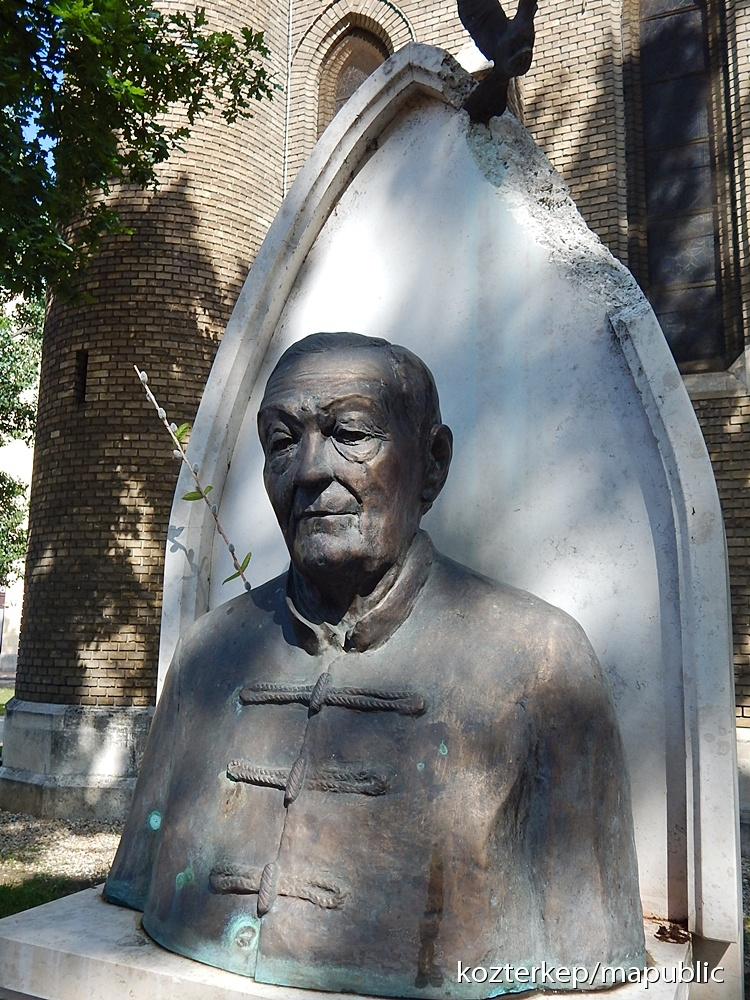
Albert Wass statue in Szeged, Hungary (2008)

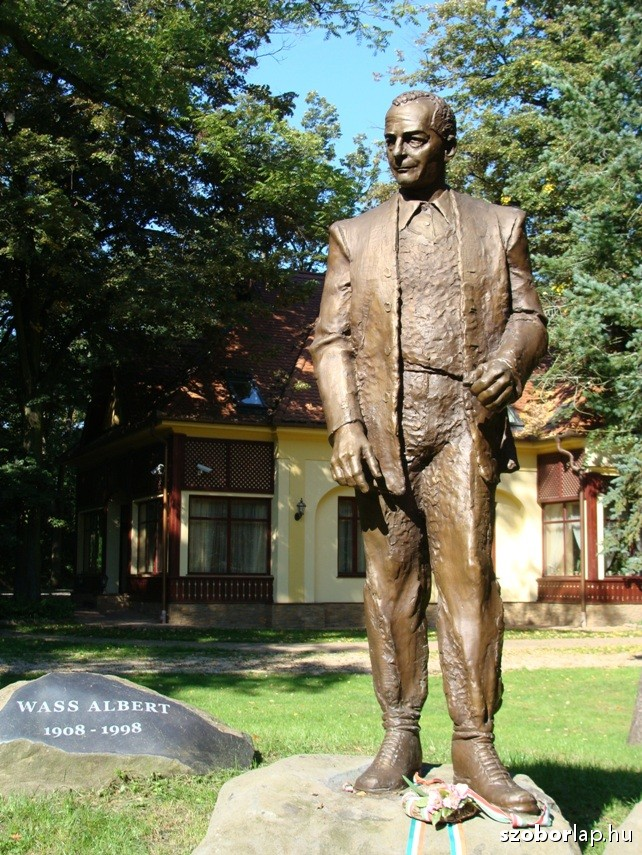
Albert Wass statue in Debrecen, Hungary (2008)

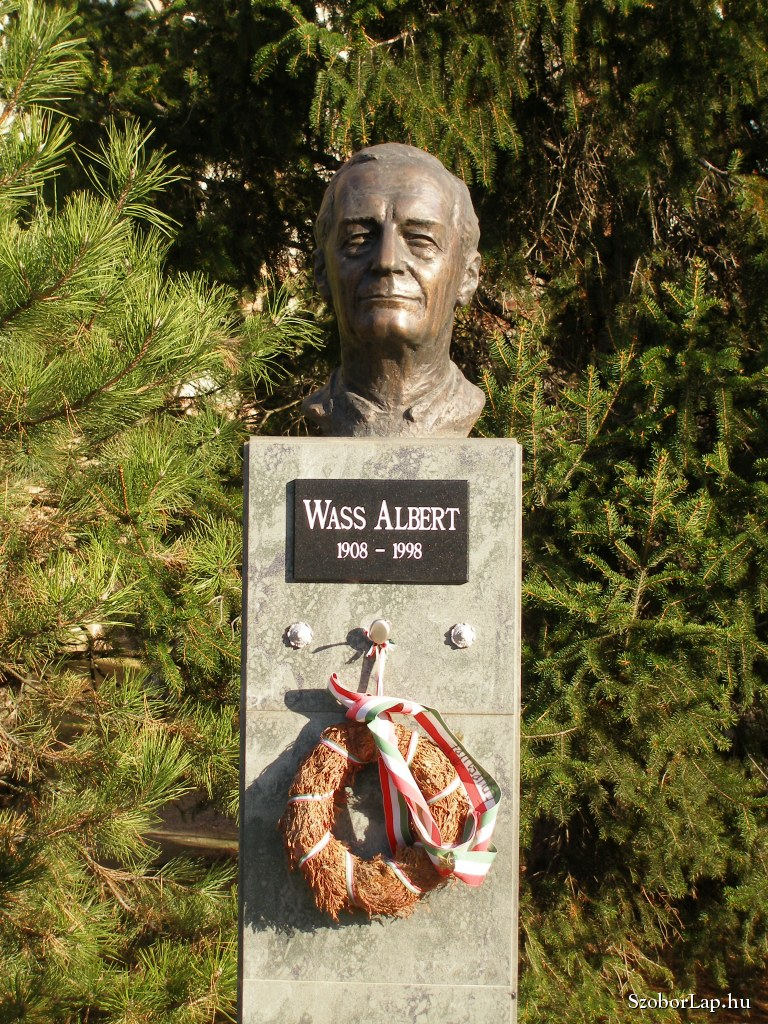
Albert Wass statue in Baja, Hungary (2007)

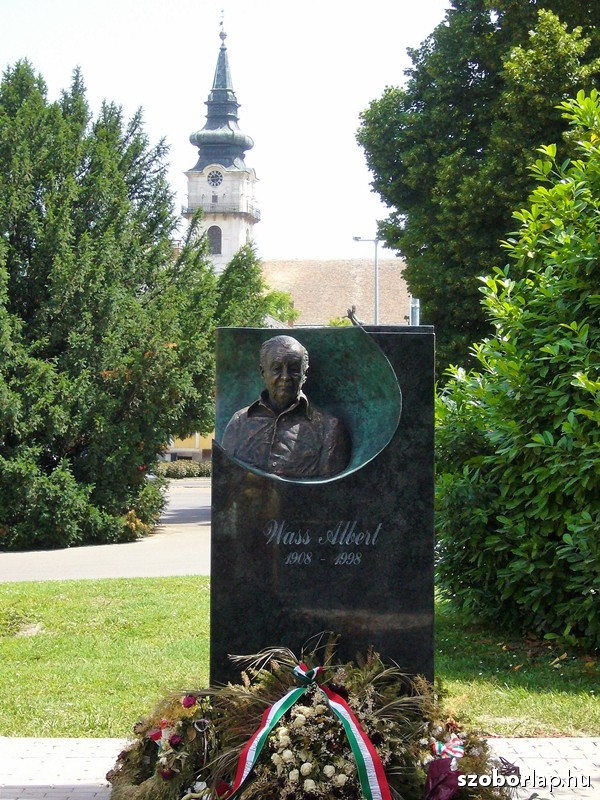
Albert Wass statue in Hódmezővásárhely, Hungary (2010)

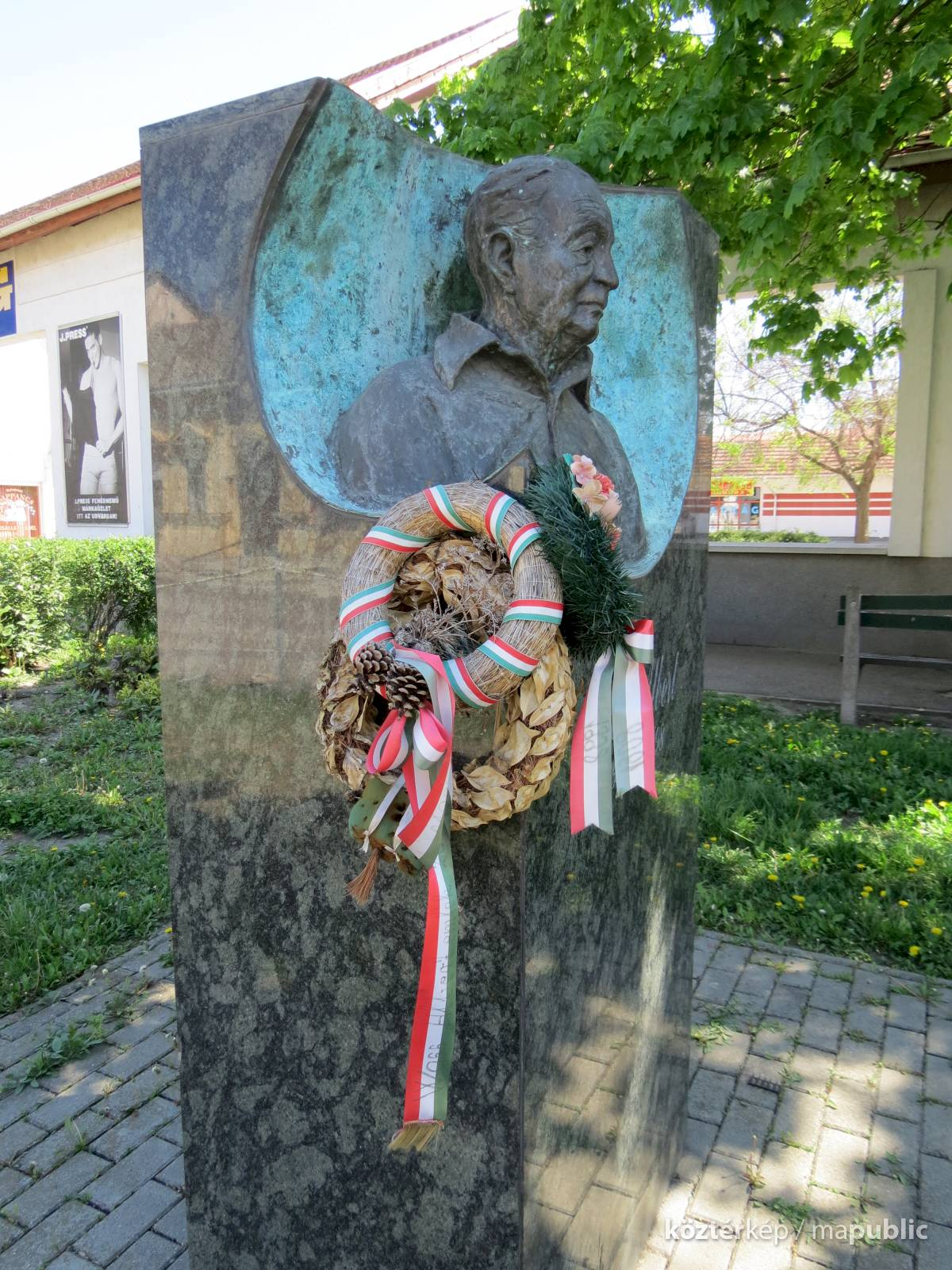
Albert Wass statue in Hódmezővásárhely, Hungary (2010)

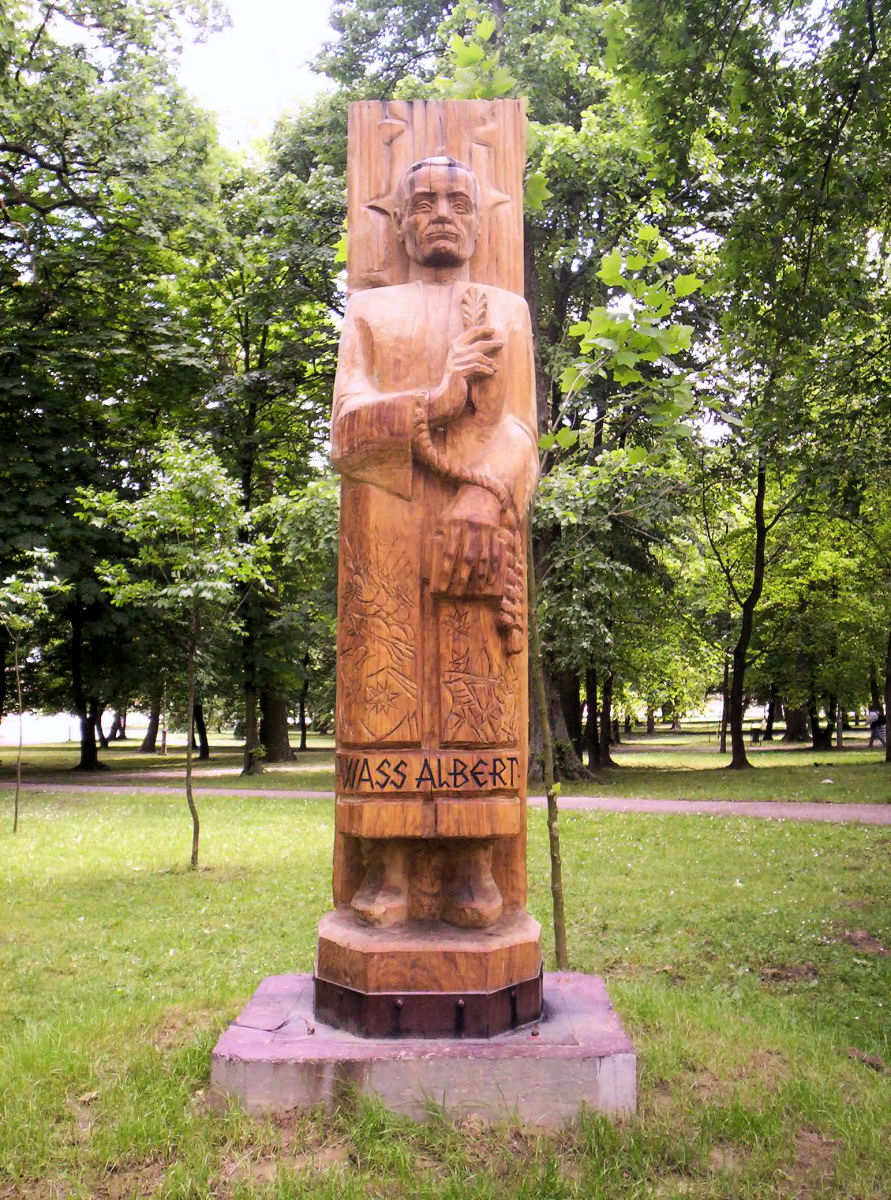
Albert Wass statue in Harkány, Hungary (2005)

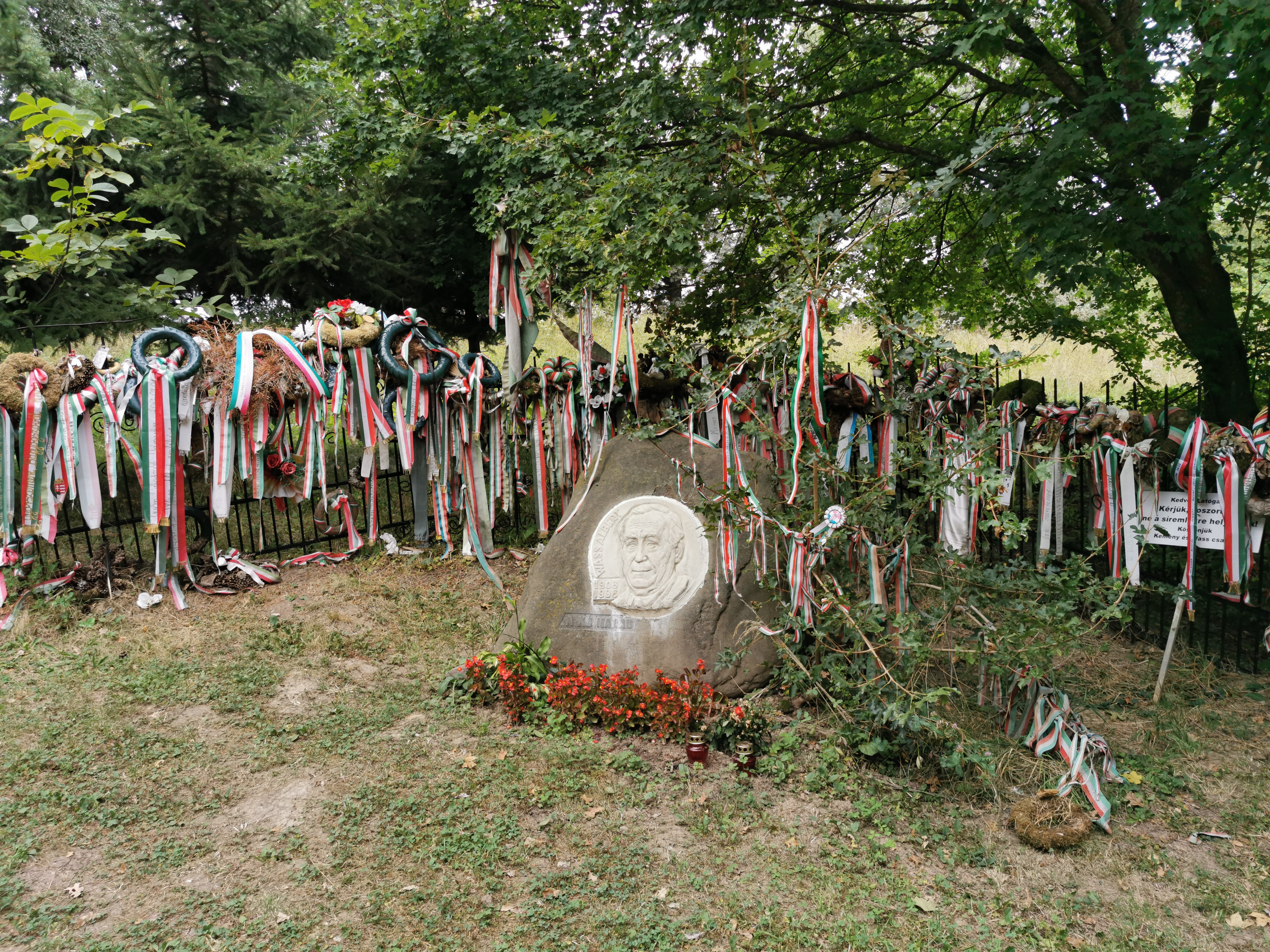
Albert Wass statue at the castle of Marosvécse (Brâncoveneşti), Transylvania, Romania (2000)

== Novels, publications ==
In his 1939 work Farkasverem (Wolfpit), he described how the Trianon generation found their feet again: the unity of the presentation of social reality, the quest for meting out justice in history, together with ancient language, music, rhythm conquered the hearts of many readers in Hungary. In 1939, he was elected member of the Transylvanian Literary Society and the Kisfaludy Society. In 1940, he was awarded the Baumgarten Prize the second time.

In 1942, he received the Klebelsberg Award and in the same year on a memorable tour in Hungary he represented Transylvanian literature together with three of his peers. He was even elected member of the Hungarian Academy of Sciences as appreciation for his knowledge in forestry.

His writings were patriotic but did not exacerbate the tensions between the Romanian and Hungarian population during the recover of Northern Transylvania as a consequence of the Second Vienna Award.

His fable A patkányok honfoglalása – Tanulságos mese fiatal magyaroknak ("The Conquest by the Rats – A Fable for Young Hungarians"), which tells how rats take over a house, because they are tolerated by the magnanimous landowner, is considered paradigmatic for antisemitic story-telling.

- 1934 Farkasverem (Wolfpit)
- 1940 Csaba
- 1940 Mire a fák megnőnek (By the Time the Trees Grow)
- 1940 Jönnek! (They Are Coming!)
- 1943 A kastély árnyékában (In the Castle's Shade)
- 1943 Egyedül a világ ellen (All Alone Against the World)
- 1943 Vérben és viharban (In Blood and Storm)
- 1944 Tavaszi szél és más színművek (Spring Breeze and Other Plays)
- 1945 Valaki tévedett (Somebody Made a Mistake) (short stories from 1945 to 1949)
- 1945 A költő és a macska (The Poet and the Cat) (short stories)
- 1947 A rézkígyó (The Copper Snake)
- 1949 Adjátok vissza a hegyeimet! (English edition: Give Back My Mountains to Me!, 1970, Eric Massey)
- 1951 Ember az országút szélén (English edition: Man by the Side of the Road, 1984)
- 1952 Elvész a nyom (The Trail Perishes)
- 1953 Tizenhárom almafa (Thirteen Apple Trees)
- 1958 Az Antikrisztus és a pásztorok (The Antichrist and the Shepherds)
- 1959 A funtineli boszorkány (The Witch of Funtinel)
- 1964 Átoksori kísértetek (English edition: The Purple Ghosts of Damnation Row, 1964)
- 1965 Elvásik a veres csillag (English edition: The Red Star Wanes, 1965)
- 1967 Magukrahagyottak (English edition: Forsaken are the Brave,1967)
- 1974 Kard és kasza (Sword and Scythe)
- 1978 Halálos köd Holtember partján (English edition: Deadly Fog at Dead Man's Landing)
- 1982 Eliza and the House that Jack Built: Historical Novel (in English)
- 1985 Hagyaték (Inheritance)
- 1989 Te és a világ (You and the World) (short stories)
- Igazságot Erdélynek! (Justice for Transylvania)
- Józan magyar szemmel I-II. (Through the Eye of a Sober Hungarian)
- Karácsonyi üzenetek – A temető megindul (Messages from Christmas – the Cemetery Starts to Move)
- Magyar pólus (Hungarian Pole)
- Népirtás Erdélyben (Genocide in Transylvania)
- Hűség bilincsében (In the Chains of Fidelity)
- Hanky tanár úr (Professor Hanky)
- Se szentek, se hősök (Neither Saints nor Heroes)
- A szikla alatti férfi (The Man Below the Cliff)
- A sólyom hangja (The Voice of the Falcon)
- Csillag az éjszakában (Star in the Night)
- Black Hammock
- Magyar Számadás (Hungarian Accounts)
- Nem nyugaton kel fel a nap (The Sun Does Not Rise in the West)
- Voltam (I was/I have/had been)

== Poems, fables, narrations ==
- 1927 Virágtemetés (Flower Burial) (poem)
- 1943 Tavak könyve (Book of the Lakes) (fable)
- 1947 Erdők könyve (Book of the Woods) (fable)
- 1947 A láthatatlan lobogó (The Invisible Flag) (poem)
- 1970 Valaki tévedett (Somebody Made a Mistake) (narrations)
- 1972 Válogatott magyar mondák és népmesék (Assorted Hungarian Legends and Folktales)
- 1978 A költő és a macska (The Poet and the Cat) (narration)

== Awards ==
- Balint Balassi Memorial Sword Award
- Hungarian Heritage Award
- Klebelsberg Award
