= Ganbold =

Ganbold is a Mongolian patronymic and given name. As of 2012, it is in Mongolia, one of the 20 most common Mongolian names. Notable people with the name include:

== People with Ganbold as a patronymic ==
- Badamsambuu Ganbold (born 1983), Mongolian born Japanese sumo wrestler, see Tokusegawa Masanao
- Batmönkhiin Ganbold (born 1991), Mongolian cross-country skier
- Bilgüün Ganbold (born 1983), Mongolian footballer
- Davaadorjiin Ganbold (born 1957), Mongolian economist and politician
- Dogsomyn Ganbold, Mongolian politician
- Gandelger Ganbold (born 1995), Mongolian international footballer
- Ganbayar Ganbold (born 2000), Mongolian international footballer
- Jambalyn Ganbold (born 1959), Mongolian judoka
- Munkhbolor Ganbold (born 1983), Mongolian contemporary artist
- Nyamdondovyn Ganbold (born 1973), Mongolian speed skater
- Tsedendambyn Ganbold, Mongolian cyclist

== People with Ganbold as given name ==
- Ganbold Davaakhuugiin (born 1962), Mongolian literary historian and literary translator
- Ganbold Lundeg, Mongolian anesthetist
- Ganbold Bazarsad (born 1984), Mongolian born Japanese sumo wrestler, see Mōkonami Sakae

Gamboldyn is a similar name.
