= Gáspár Nagy =

Hungarian poet and writer

- Born: May 4, 1949; Bérbaltavár, Hungary
- Died: January 3, 2007 (aged 57); Budapest, Hungary
- Occupations: Poet; writer
- Spouse: Marta Szabo (m. 1974)
- Children: 3
- Writing career
- Notable awards: Balint Balassi Memorial Sword Award (1999)

Gáspár Nagy (May 4, 1949, Bérbaltavár – January 3, 2007, Budapest) was a Hungarian poet and writer.

== Life ==
He graduated from the Benedictine Grammar School of Pannonhalma where he studied Library Science in Szombathely, then Aesthetics and Sociology in Budapest.

He was editor of Móra Ferenc Publishing House (1976–1980), secretary of Hungarian Writer’s Association (1981–85), co-editor, with Sándor Csoóri, of Hitel the first legally permitted oppositional periodical (1988–2007) and literary editor of the Hungarian Catholic Radio (2003–2007). In 1974, he married Marta Szabo; they had one son, and two daughters.

From the very beginning his poetry was determined by the ideas of the two important facts of the Central-European history: 1956 and 1968. The Budapest Autumn and the Prague Spring motivated him to protest against the Communist dictatorship and his poems stimulated the democratic changes in Hungary in 1989. His legendary “political system changing” poem "Öröknyár, elmúltam kilenc éves", (Eternal Summer: I’m Over Nine) was published in 1984 in the October issue of the Új Forrás periodical. The brave poem was about the unmarked grave of Imre Nagy (he was the executed prime minister in the 1956 revolution), and about the unnamed murderers.

One day he must be buried
and we must not forget
to appoINt the murderers!

The hidden initials of Imre Nagy (NI - in Hungary the given name traditionally comes after the family name) appear in the last two letters of each line. This hidden meaning escaped the notice of the censors and the poem was published. The authorities retaliated, stripping him of his post as Secretary to the Hungarian Writers Union.

== Selected bibliography ==
- 1975 Koronatűz (Crown Fire)
- 1978 Halántékdob (Temple Drum)
- 1982 Földi pörök (Earthly Trials)
- 1986 Áron mondja (Áron Says)
- 1987 Kibiztosított beszéd (Trigger Speech)
- 1989 Múlik a jövőnk (Our Future is Passing)
- 1993 Mosolyelágazás (Forking Smiles)
- 1994 Fölös ébrenlétem (Useless Wake)
- 1995 Zónaidő (Zone Time)
- 1995 Augusztusban, Ludvík Jahn nyomában (In August, in the Footsteps of Ludvík Jahn)
- 1998 Tudom, nagy nyári délután lesz (I know It will be a Big Summer Afternoon)
- 1999 Szabadrabok (Free Slaves, collected poems, 1968–1998)
- 2000 Hullámzó vizeken kereszt (A Cross on Wavy Water)
- 2001 Amíg fölragyog a jászol (Until the Manger Shines)

== Award ==
Balint Balassi Memorial Sword Award

The founder of the award Pal Molnar
