= Bálint Balassi =

16th-century Hungarian poet, writer, soldier

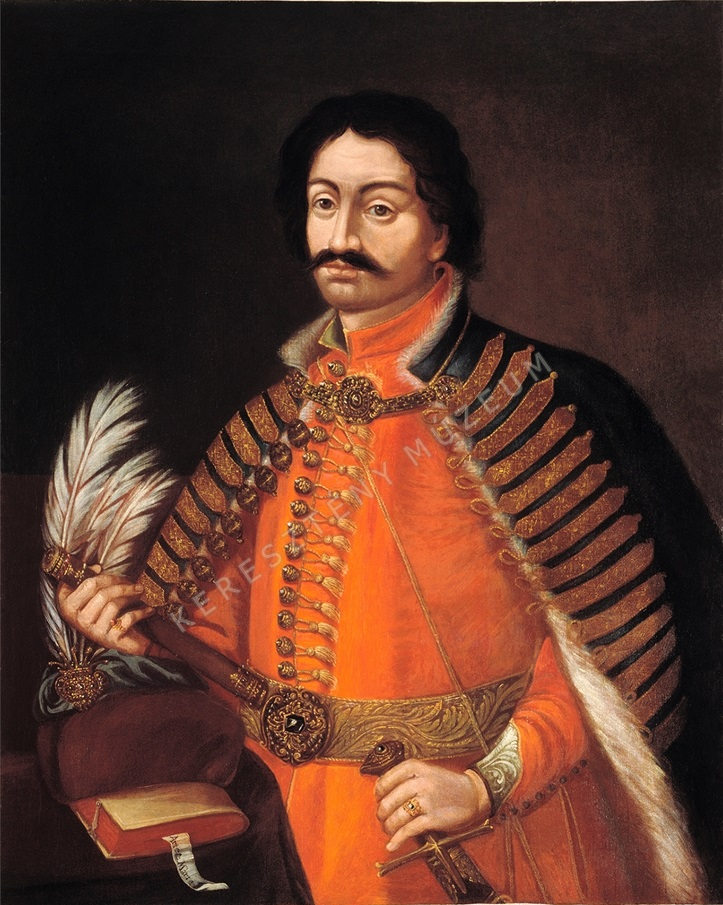
Bálint Balassi

Baron Valentinus Balassa de Kékkő et Gyarmat (Hungarian: Gyarmati és kékkői báró Balassi Bálint, Slovak: Valentín Balaša (Valaša) barón z Ďarmôt a Modrého Kameňa; 20 October 1554 – 30 May 1594) was a Renaissance Hungarian lyric poet. He wrote in nine languages: Latin, Italian, German, Polish, Turkish, Slovak, Croatian, Magyar and Romanian. He lived in the Kingdom of Hungary, a multinational state in Central Europe.

== Life ==
Balassa was born at Zvolen the Captaincy of Cisdanubia and Mining Towns in the Kingdom of Hungary (today Slovakia). He was educated by the reformer Peter Bornemisza and by his mother, the highly gifted Protestant zealot, Anna Sulyok. He went to school in Nuremberg since 1565.

His first work was a translation of Michael Bock's Wurtzgärtlein für krancke Seelen (Little Herb Garden for Sad Souls), (published in Kraków), to comfort his father while in Polish exile. On his father's rehabilitation, Valentinus accompanied him to court, and was also present at the coronation diet in Pressburg (today's Bratislava), capital of Royal Hungary in 1572. He then joined the army and fought the Turks as an officer in the fortress of Eger in North-Eastern Hungary. Here he fell violently in love with Anna Losonczi, the daughter of the captain of Temesvár, and evidently, from his verses, his love was not unrequited. But after the death of her first husband she gave her hand to Kristóf Ungnád.

Naturally Balassa only began to realize how much he loved Anna when he had lost her. He pursued her with gifts and verses, but she remained true to her pique and to her marriage vows, and he could only enshrine her memory in immortal verse.

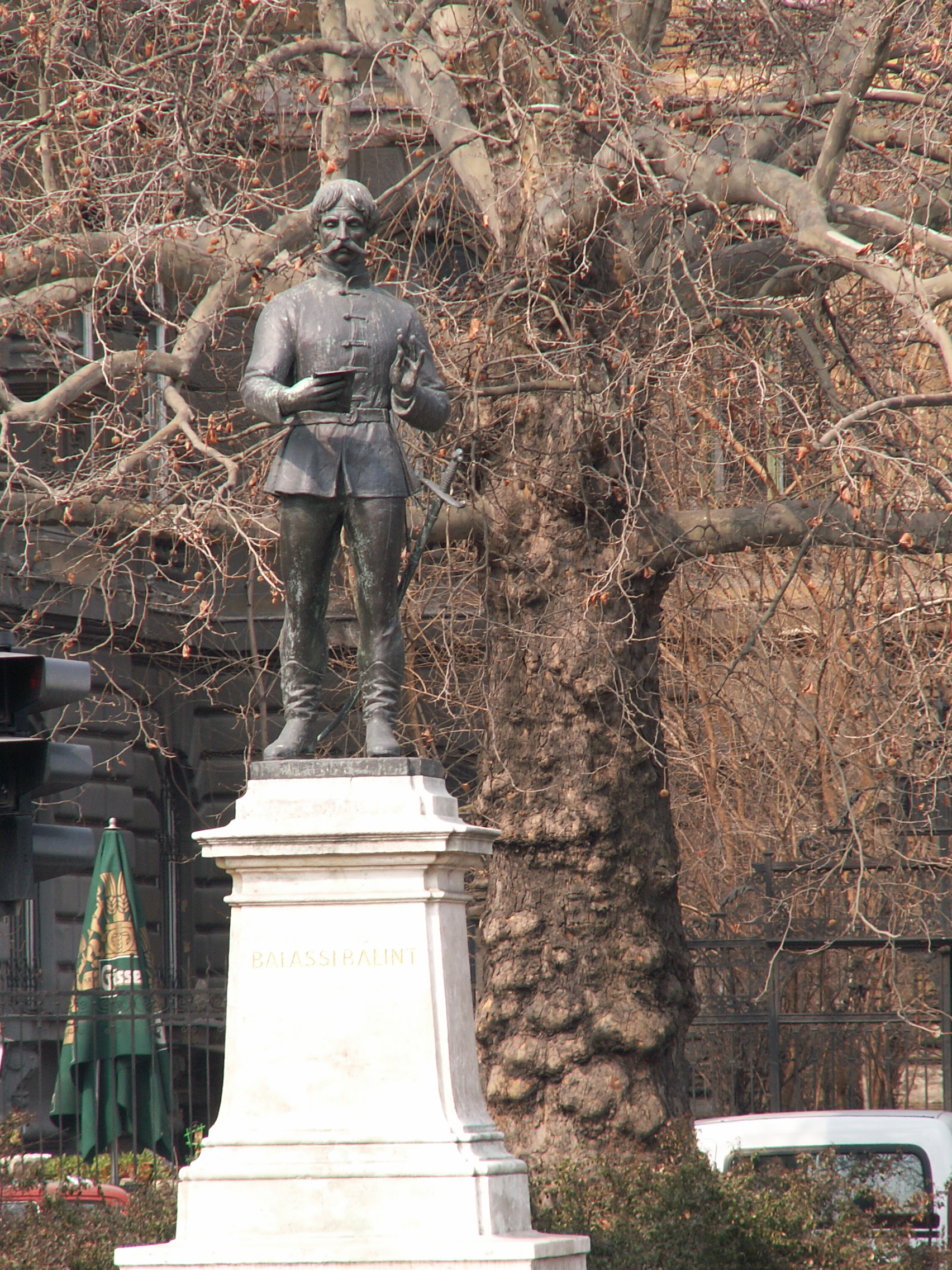
Balassi Bálint statue at the Kodály körönd in Budapest

In 1574 Valentinus was sent to the camp of Gáspár Bekes to assist him against Stephen Báthory; but his troops were encountered and scattered on the way there, and he himself was wounded and taken prisoner. His not very rigorous captivity lasted for two years, during which he accompanied Báthory where the latter was crowned as King of Poland. He returned to Hungary soon after the death of his father, Joannes Balassa.

In 1584 he married his cousin, Krisztina Dobó, the daughter of the commandant, István Dobó of Eger. This became the cause of many of his subsequent misfortunes. His wife's greedy relatives nearly ruined him by legal processes, and when in 1586 he turned Catholic to escape their persecutions they slandered him, saying that he and his son had embraced Islam. His desertion of his wife and legal troubles were followed by some years of uncertainty, but in 1589 he was invited to Poland to serve there in the impending war with Turkey. This did not take place and after a spell in the Jesuit College of Braunsberg, Balassa, somewhat disappointed, returned to Hungary in 1591. In the 15 years war he joined the Army, and died at the siege of Esztergom-Víziváros the same year as the result of a severe leg wound caused by a cannonball. He is buried in Hybe in today's Slovakia.

Balassa's poems fall into four divisions: hymns, patriotic and martial songs, original love poems, and adaptations from the Latin and German. His manuscript was circulated for generations but never printed until 1874, when Farkas Deák discovered a copy of them in the Radványi library. Balassa was also the inventor of the strophe which goes by his name. It consists of nine lines a a b c c b d d b, or three rhyming pairs alternating with the rhyming third, sixth and ninth lines.

== Family tree ==
The family tree of the Balassi family:

Ferenc Balassa	Orsolya Perényi	Balázs Sulyok
Imre Balassa	Menyhért Balassa	Anna Thurzó	Zsigmond Balassa	János Balassa	Anna Sulyok	Sára Sulyok	István Dobó	Krisztina Sulyok	György Bocskai
Boldizsár Balassa	István Balassa	Bálint Balassi	Ferenc Balassi	Damján Dobó	Ferenc Dobó	Krisztina Dobó
Katalin Hagymássy	István Bocskai	Gábor Haller	Ilona Bocskai	Miklós Bocskai	Kristóf Bánffy	Judit Bocskai	György Palocsai Horvát	Krisztina Bocskai	Erzsébet Bocskai	Kristóf Báthory

== Literary award ==
The Balint Balassi Memorial Sword Award is an annual Hungarian literary award founded by Pal Molnar in 1997, and presented to an outstanding Hungarian poet, and to a foreign poet for excellence in translation of Hungarian literature, including the works of Balassi.

== See also ==
- Balassi Institute
- Balint Balassi Memorial Sword Award
- Pal Molnar, founder of the Balint Balassi Memorial Sword Award
