= Bérbaltavár =

- Seal

- Location of Vas county in Hungary

- Location of Bérbaltavár
- Coordinates: 47.00862°N 16.96237°E
- Country: Hungary
- County: Vas

Area
  - Total: 25.67 km^{2} (9.91 sq mi)

Population (2004)
  - Total: 542
  - Density: 21.11/km^{2} (54.7/sq mi)
- Time zone: UTC+1 (CET)
  - Summer (DST): UTC+2 (CEST)
- Postal code: 9831
- Area code: 94

Bérbaltavár is a village in Vas County, Hungary.

== Notable people ==
- Ádám Balogh (1665–1711), kuruc colonel
- József Festetics (1691–1757), major general of the Hungarian cavalry
- Gáspár Nagy (1949–2007), writer and poet
