= Huba Wass de Czege =

United States Army general (1941–2025)

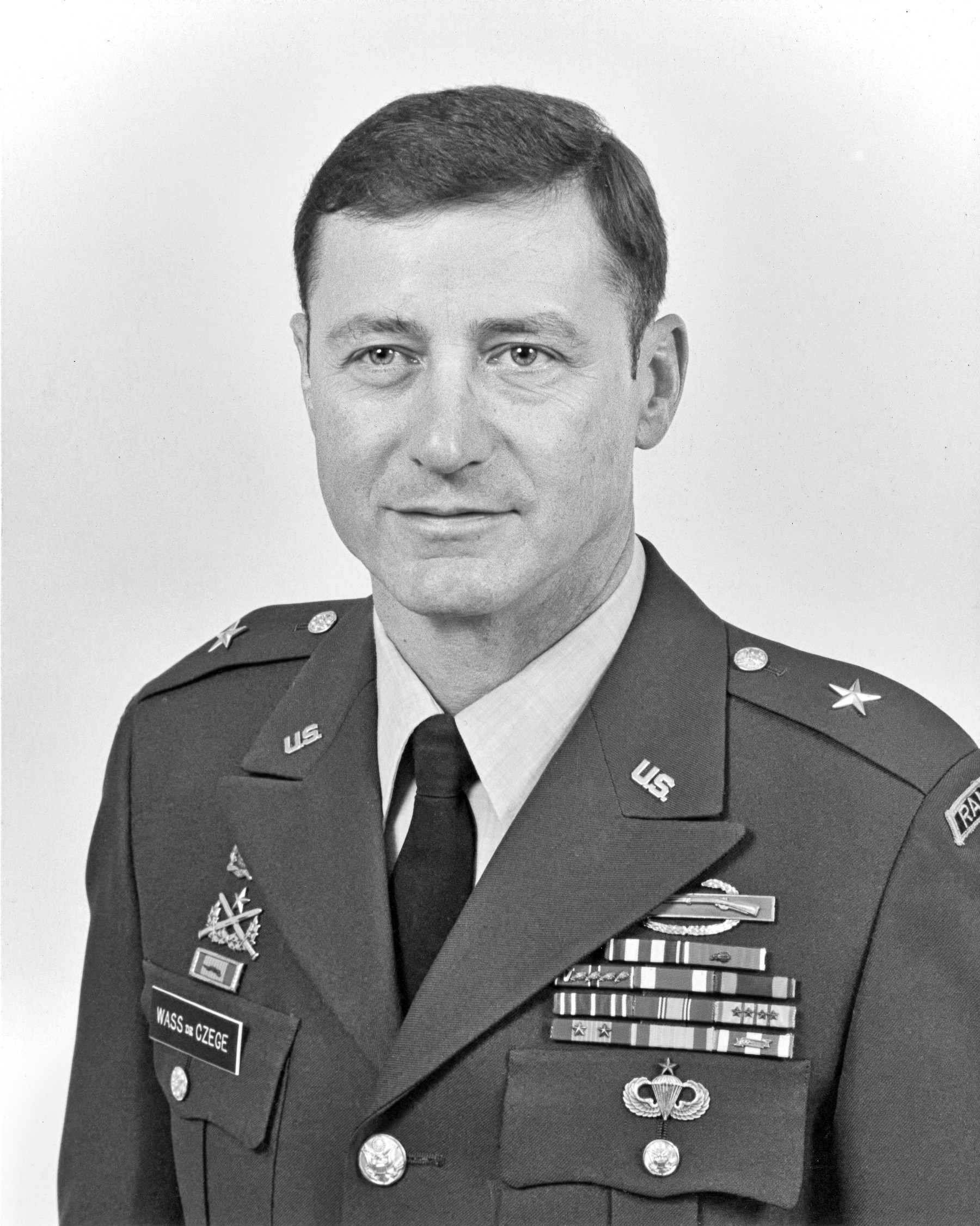
- Born: 13 August 1941; Kolozsvár, Hungary
- Died: 22 November 2025 (aged 84); Gainesville, Florida, U.S.
- Military career
- Allegiance: United States
- Branch: United States Army
- Service years: 1964–1993
- Rank: Brigadier General
- Conflicts: Vietnam War
- Awards: Silver Star; Legion of Merit; Bronze Star Medal

Brigadier General Huba Wass de Czege (pronounced VOSH de TSEH-geh; 13 August 1941 – 22 November 2025) was a Hungarian-born Brigadier General in the United States Army. The son of Count Albert Wass de Szentegyed et Czege, Wass de Czege was a Hungarian immigrant. He retired from the U.S. Army as a General Officer with a reputation as a highly innovative thinker. Wass de Czege was the founder and first director of the School of Advanced Military Studies at the United States Army Command and General Staff College.

== Life and career ==
Wass de Czege graduated as an infantry officer from West Point in 1964. He was a platoon leader in the 8th Infantry Division stationed in West Germany. He was deployed to Vietnam in January 1967. During his first tour he was a senior advisor for a Vietnamese Ranger battalion. On his second tour, he commanded Company A, 3rd Battalion, 503rd Infantry Regiment. He served two tours in Vietnam where he earned five Bronze Stars and the Silver Star for Gallantry in action.

After returning from Vietnam, he graduated from the Infantry Officer Advanced Course in 1970. Afterwards, he attended the John F. Kennedy School of Government at Harvard University. He also graduated from the Command and General Staff College at Fort Leavenworth in 1976. During these years, he served in different series of assignments in the 9th Infantry Division: he was also commander of the 1st Battalion, 60th Infantry Regiment.

Wass de Czege was a principal designer of the operational concept known as AirLand Battle which was the doctrinal concept of the U.S. Army for many years. He was the founder and first director of the Army's School for Advanced Military Studies where he also taught applied military strategy. In the late 1980s, he was selected to command the 1st Brigade 9th Infantry Regiment of the 7th Infantry Division (Light).

His most senior military position was assistant division commander as a brigadier general of the 1st Infantry Division. After retiring in 1993, de Czege became heavily involved in the Army After Next Project and served on several Defense Advanced Research Projects Agency advisory panels.

Wass de Czege died in Gainesville, Florida, on 22 November 2025, at the age of 84. He was interred at Arlington National Cemetery.

== Awards and decorations ==

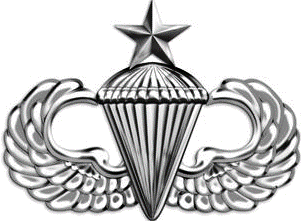

Badge	Combat Infantryman Badge		
Badge	Senior Parachutist Badge		
1st row	Silver Star		Legion of Merit with bronze oak leaf cluster
2nd row	Bronze Star Medal with "V" device and four bronze oak leaf clusters	Meritorious Service Medal	Air Medal
3rd row	Achievement Medal	National Defense Service Medal w/ one bronze service star	Vietnam Service Medal w/ four bronze service star
4th row	Republic of Vietnam Gallantry Cross w/ two stars	Vietnamese Training Service Medal 2nd class	Republic of Vietnam Campaign Medal w/ 1960– device
Unit awards	Gallantry Cross Unit Citation		
Badge	Ranger Tab		

== Sources ==
- Association of Graduates, USMA, The Register of Graduates and Former Cadets, USMA West Point: 2008.
