= Ádám Balogh =

Kuruc colonel in the Hungarian army (1665-1711)

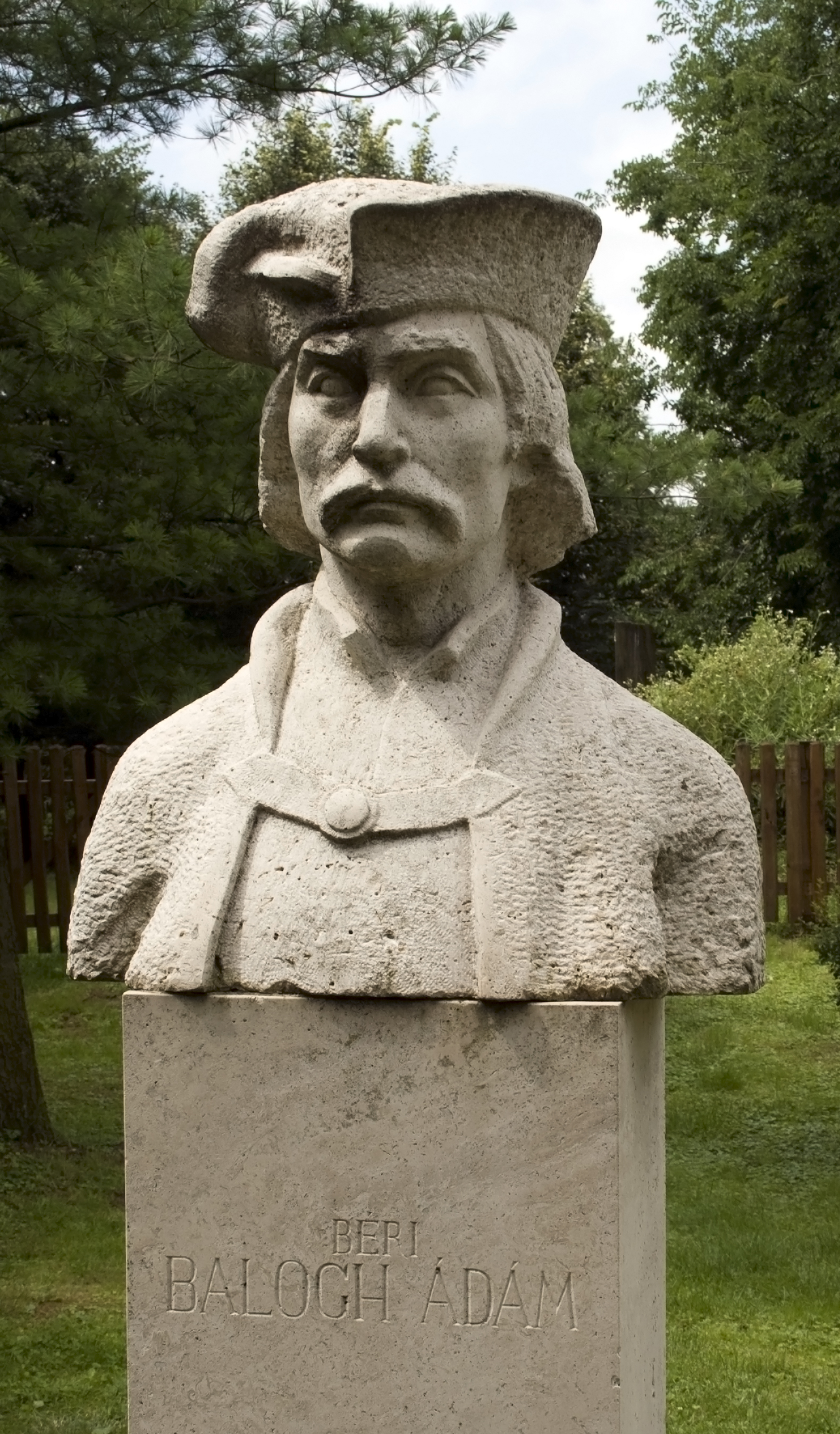
Ádám Balogh

Ádám Balogh de Bér (c. 1665 in Bérbaltavár, Kingdom of Hungary – 1711 in Buda) was one of the most famous kuruc colonels of the Hungarian army during Rákóczi's War for Independence against the rule of the Austrian Habsburg dynasty.

== Life ==
Balogh was born to a Catholic noble family. His father was István Balogh, who died in 1678, and his mother was Rebeka Káldy, a catholic noble lady. Balogh married Julianna Festetics, and they had seven children.

He began service at a young age as the infantry's voivode in Csobánc castle and took part in campaigns of the Turkish wars. In 1705 he saw action with the kuruc troops who almost captured the Austrian king near Vienna. Francis II Rákóczi promoted him to colonel in 1708. He was executed in 1711 by Habsburgs in Buda Castle. Rákóczi tried to save him but was unsuccessful.

== Legacy ==
Balogh is famous in Hungarian literature and film. His character appears in the TV series Captain of Tenkes (A Tenkes kapitánya, 1964). In the series, taking place in 1704, he is depicted as a colonel, although historically he was only a captain then.
