= Mongolian Society of Anesthesiologists =

Medical association in Mongolia

The Mongolian Society of Anesthesiologists is a medical association in Mongolia.

Ganbold Lundeg, a member of The Lancet Commission on Global Surgery, is the president of the society.

As recently as 2000 there were only 106 anaesthetists in the country, and the society was said to be disorganised and lacking in education and advocacy. Since 2008 the society has been working with the World Federation of Societies of Anaesthesiologists and the Australian Society of Anaesthetists to develop the profession. Surgery no longer takes place without anesthesia and surgical mortality has decreased from 0.53% in 2000 to 0.2% in 2015.
