= Wass de Czege =

The Wass de Czege family (also known as czegei Wass or cegei Wass) is one of the oldest Hungarian noble families in Transylvania (today part of Romania).

== Origins ==
The origins of the family Wass de Cege/Czege (Hungarian name; Romanian: Țaga) are unknown, however it is very likely that they came to Transylvania from Western Hungary. According to a diploma of doubtful authenticity the first two ancestors known by name under king Béla III of Hungary (1172–1176) took part in the king's campaign led against the Byzantine Empire. As a reward for that the two of them were donated nine villages in the County Doboka (Romanian: Dăbâca).

The exact lineage of the family can be traced continuously only beginning with the 14th century. By that time Miklós Wass Sr castellan of Csicsó (Ciceu) was familiaris of the Transylvanian voivode Ladislaus Kán who rose up against King Charles I of Hungary (1310–1342), but afterwards, the family members succeeding him excelled in their loyalty to the king.

For several decades in the 14th century Transylvania was ruled by voievodes from the Lackfi family (House of Lacković), who also held many other important offices in the government. Being their familiares, the Wass came into offices as castellan at Höltövény, Csicsó (Ciceu), Küküllővár (Cetatea de Baltă), Kőhalom (Rupea), Cserög (Čerević) castles, comes (Doboka, Kolozs) or vicecomes (Ugocsa). They took part in Louis the Great’s (1342–1382) campaigns against Croatia, Bosnia, Bulgaria, Italy and Walachia. For their services the king donated them smaller estates, in 1363 they acquired ius gladii (which meant absolute power in trialing their serfs) and the right to hold weekly fairs in Cege.

From the end of the 14th century they ceased getting other offices or other estates, and relapsed into the world of the well-off country nobility. Only after the fall of the Medieval Hungary (1541) did they get political roles within the Transylvanian Principality.

In the Middle Ages the Wass had their main estates in Cege (Ţaga), Szentegyed (Sântejude), Szentgothárd (Sucutard), Mohaly (Măhal), Szentiván (Sântioana), Pulyon (Puini) and Boncnyíres (Bonţ), which were neighbouring villages in county Doboka and remained the property of the family. Beginning with the first decades of the 14th century they had smaller estates in Western Hungary, as well in counties Vas, Veszprém and Győr, however these were lost to other families.

== Notable members of the family ==
- Albert Wass (1908–1998) - Hungarian noble, forest engineer, novelist, poet
- Huba Wass de Czege (1941–2025) - American Brigadier general, his son.

== See also ==
- List of titled noble families in the Kingdom of Hungary
