= Balint Balassi Memorial Sword Award =

European award for literature

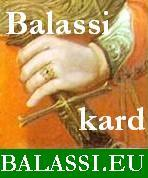
Balint Balassi Memorial Sword Award 2010 logo

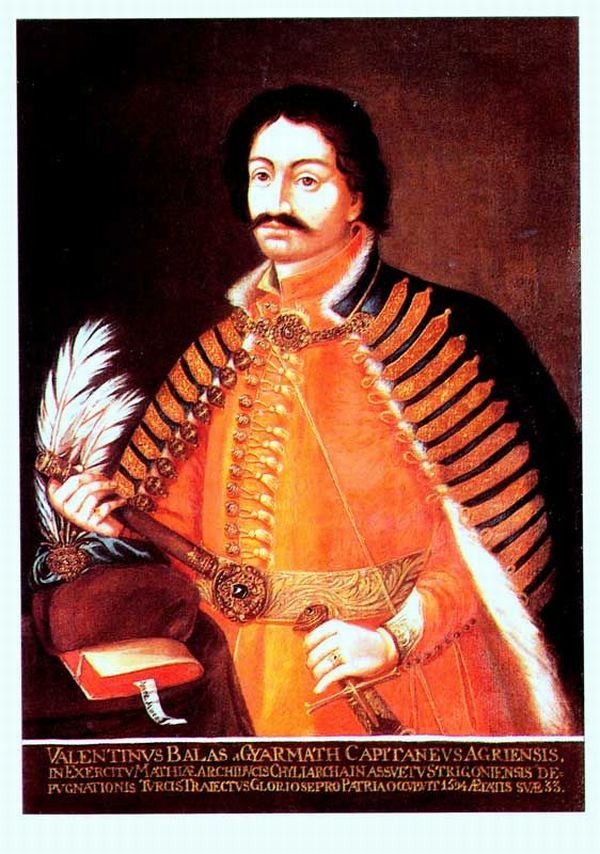
Balassi Bálint-emlékkard

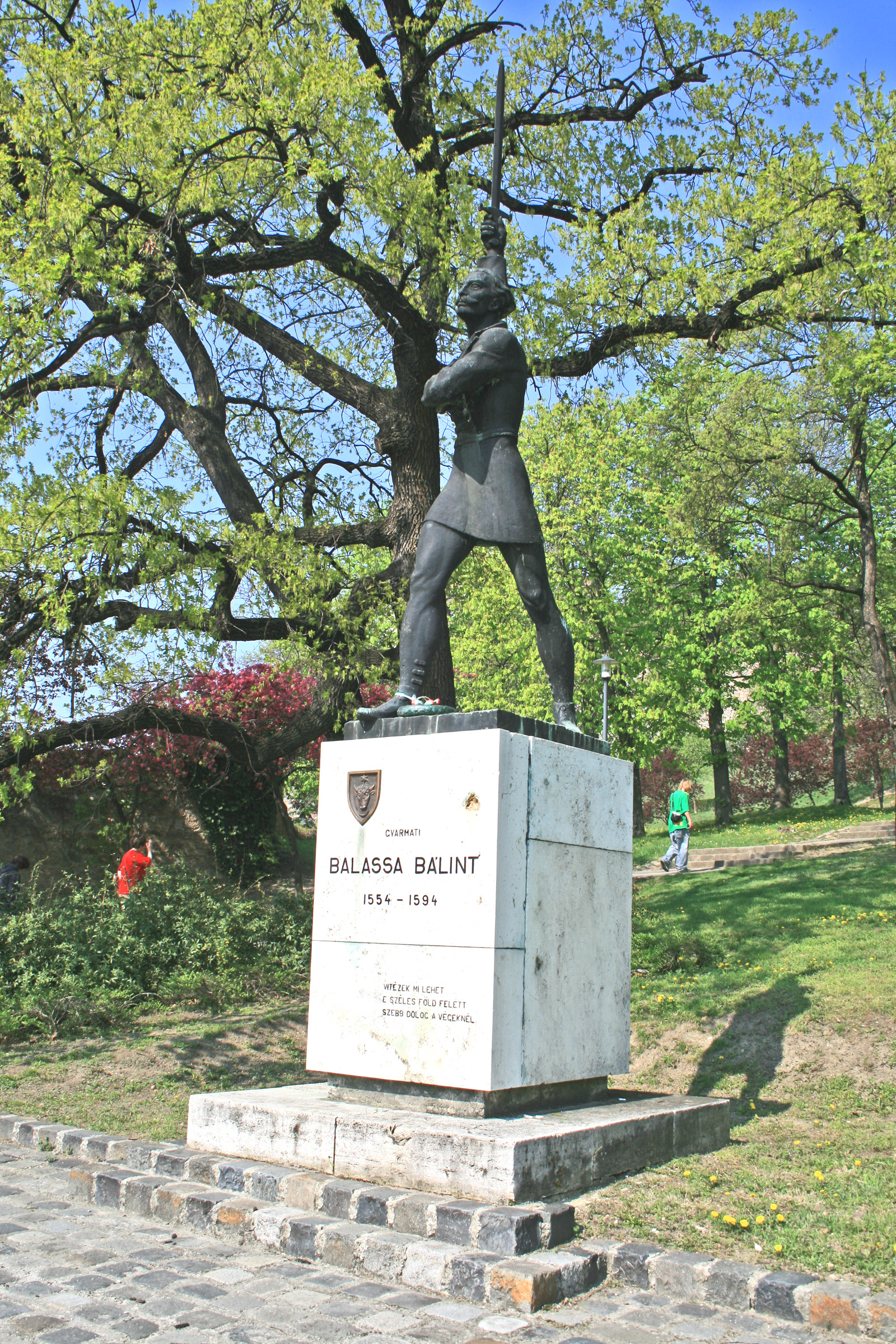
Statue of Bálint Balassi in park, Esztergom Castle, Esztergom

The Balint Balassi Memorial Sword Award is a European award for literature presented in Budapest since 1997. The native form of this name is Balassi Bálint-emlékkard (Balassi Bálint-emlékkard). This award commemorates the 16th century Hungarian poet Bálint Balassi. The memorial sword is presented annually to an outstanding Hungarian poet, and to a foreign poet for excellence in translation of Hungarian literature, including the works of Balassi. The sword itself is a replica of those sabres that the 16th century Hungarian cavalry wore during the sieges of fortresses. They are the work of a contemporary swordsmith. This award is presented each year on Bálint's (Valentine's) Day, February 14, in the city of Buda. The celebration venue is traditionally the Hotel Gellért.

== The advisory board ==
The founder of the new award is Pal Molnar journalist, his fellows are Gabriella Lőcsei journalist, József Zelnik writer and András Rubovszky hotelier. In addition, all past award winners automatically become board members, so the literary profession makes up the majority.

== Global focus ==
In the beginning only Hungarian poets received the Balassi sword, but since 2002, each year, a foreign literary translator has also been recognized. Since then the board has viewed Balassi's sword as a literary prize of European scope. But since then it has been received by Asian and American poets as well, making it an award of global scope.

== Balassi Mass ==
Since 2008, the Balint Balassi Memorial Swords have been blessed during a Balassi Mass held a few days before the award ceremony. On January 25, 2013, in the presence of some three hundred Hungarians, Bishop Laszlo Kiss-Rigo blessed the two swords during a Mass celebrated in Saint Stephen's Cathedral, Vienna.

== The prize itself ==
In addition to the sharp, dangerous weapon – which is made by József Fazekas armourer – the winners receive a diploma, a limited-edition porcelain statue from the famous Herend manufacture and a bottle of wine. The particular wine is selected at a national tasting competition in the preceding year, and as a result this champion wine is entitled to don the “Balassi's sword” label.

== Past recipients ==
- 1997 Bálint Tóth
- 1998 Kornél Döbrentei and Albert Wass
- 1999 Gáspár Nagy
- 2000 Ferenc Buda and Attila Gérecz (posthumously)
- 2001 József Utassy
- 2002 Árpád Farkas and, for translation, Ernesto Rodrigues (Lisbon, Portugal)
- 2003 Benedek Kiss and, for translation, Teresa Worowska (Warsaw, Poland)
- 2004 László Vári Fábián and, for translation, Armando Nuzzo (Rome, Italy)
- 2005 István Ferenczes and, for translation, Tuomo Lahdelma (Jyväskylä, Finland)
- 2006 Sándor Csoóri and, for translation, Lucie Szymanowska (Prague, Czech Republic)
- 2007 János Csokits and, for translation, Dursun Ayan (Ankara, Turkey)
- 2008 Simon Serfőző and, for translation, Yuri Gusev (Moscow, Russia)
- 2009 István Tari and, for translation, Ganbold Daváhügijn (Ulaanbaatar, Mongolia)
- 2010 István Ágh and, for translation, John Ridland (Santa Barbara, United States)
- 2011 Menyhért Tamás and, for translation, Ivan Canev (Sofia, Bulgaria)
- 2012 József Tornai and, for translation, Gabriel Zanmaku Olembe (Kinshasa, Democratic Republic of the Congo)
- 2013 Márton Kalász and, for translation, Jean-Luc Moreau (Paris, France)
- 2014 Ferenc Kulcsár and, for translation, Sander Liivak (Rakvere, Estonia)
- 2015 Anna Kiss and, for translation, Muzaffar Dzasokhov (Vladikavkaz, Russia)
- 2016 Sándor Agócs and, for translation, Harada Kiyomi (Tokyo, Japan)
- 2017 János Szikra and, for translation, Nelson Ascher (São Paulo, Brazil)
- 2018 László Lövétei Lázár and, for translation, Marin Georgiev (Sofia, Bulgaria)
- 2019 Gábor Nagy and, for translation, Paskal Gilevski (Skopje, North Macedonia)
- 2020 Noémi László and, for translation, Vahram Martirosyan (Yerevan, Armenia)
- 2021 László Kürti and, for translation, Ross Gillett (Melbourne, Australia)
- 2022 Lajos Bence and, for translation, Elena Lavinia Dumitru (Rome, Romania)
- 2023 Zalán Tibor and, for translation, Peter V. Czipott (San Diego, United States)
- 2024 Fekete Vince and, for translation, Abdallah Al Naggar (Cairo, Egypt)
- 2025 Erzsebet Toth and, for translation, Endre Gyorgy Farkas (Montreal, Canada)
- 2026 Ferenc Bozok and for translation Bela Szomi (Ljubljana, Slovenia)

== Sources ==
- Chisholm, Hugh, ed. (1911). "Balassa, Bálint" . Encyclopædia Britannica. Vol. 3 (11th ed.). Cambridge University Press. p. 240.
- "Kard". Balassi.eu. Archived from the original on 3 March 2016. — Past recipients
- Petőfi — Irodalmi Múzeum
- — Lotuskitap.Com
- "Kard ki kard – Litera | Az irodalmi portál". Litera.hu. — Litera.Hu
- Felvidék.ma. "Kulcsár Ferenc személyében először kapott felvidéki Balassi Bálint-emlékkardot | Felvidék.ma". Felvidek.ma. — felvidek.ma
- Dormán László. "Kulcsár Ferenc: "csak az tud teremteni, beszélni, akiben erős a lélek és a hit" | Felvidék.ma". Felvidek.ma. — Report on felvidek.
- "Balassi-mise a Szegedi Dómban – a Telin TV összeállítása". YouTube. 2015-01-23. Archived from the original on 2021-12-15. — Balassi Mass in Szeged, Hungary, 2012.
- "Térkép – Balassi mise". YouTube. Archived from the original on 2021-12-15. — Balassi Mass in Vienna, Austria, 2013
- "Balassi Bálint-emlékkard szentelés Gyulán". YouTube. 2014-02-04. Archived from the original on 2021-12-15. — Balassi Mass in Gyula, Hungary, 2014.
- "Vásárhelyen szentelték fel a Balassi-kardokat". YouTube. Archived from the original on 2021-12-15. — Balassi Mass in Hodmezovasarhely, Hungary, 2015.
- Kultura.hu (2016-02-15). "Kultúra.hu | Kardot kapott a japán versfordító". Kultura.hu. Archived from the original on 16 February 2016. — Celebration in Budapest, 2016.
- "John Ridland Receives Hungarian Sword for Translation". Independent.com. — Interview with Ridland about the sword
- "MolnarPal". Molnarpal.hu. — The founder's home page
- — Ridland is awarded
- — Culture.Hu
- Balassi Bálint. "Babel Web Anthology :: The page of Balassi Bálint, Hungarian Works". Babelmatrix.org. — Babelmatrix
- "Babel Web Anthology :: Petőfi Sándor: John the Valiant (detail) (János vitéz (részlet) in English)". Babelmatrix.org. — John the Valiant from S. Petőfi and J. Ridland
- "Babel Web Anthology :: Mészöly Miklós: Миклош Месей – Высокая школа (Magasiskola in Russian)". Babelmatrix.org. — A translation from Yuri Gusev
- Csokonai Vitéz Mihály. "Babel Web Anthology :: Csokonai Vitéz Mihály: À esperança (A reményhez in Portuguese)". Babelmatrix.org. — A translation from Ernesto Rodrigues
- "MédiaKlikk". M1 (in Hungarian). — News about Dursun Ayan's book
- kormend.hu (2017-03-15). "Kortárs irodalom Balassi bűvöletében". Kormend.hu. — Kormend.hu
- 2017. April 03. Monday. "The Tokaji Aszú of the Dereszla winery was given to poets | Trademagazin". Trademagazin.hu. — Balassi Sword Wine Muster
- "Oszétiába került az egyik idei Balassi Bálint-emlékkard". YouTube. 2015-02-17. Archived from the original on 2021-12-15. — Celebration '2015
- "Magyar Nemzeti Digitális Archívum • Bácsalmásra és Brazíliába utazik a Balassi-kard". Mandarchiv.hu. — Article about 21. celebration — Los Angeles Best Deals
- Lövétei kapta a legrangosabb magyar irodalmi díjat
- Huszonharmadszor adták át a Molnár Pál által alapított díjat
- Í legrangosabb magyar irodalmi díj körmendi költőé lett
