= Vahram Martirosyan =

Armenian writer, screenwriter and journalist

Vahram Martirosyan (Armenian: Վահրամ Մարտիրոսյան; July 27, 1959, Gyumri) is an Armenian writer, screenwriter and journalist. His first novel, Landslide (2000) was a bestseller in Armenia, and one of the few modern Armenian novels translated abroad, as Glissement de terrain in French.

== Biography ==
=== Education ===
- Studied at the Department of Armenian Philology, Yerevan State University (YSU), from 1976 to 1981.
- Completed postgraduate studies in Psychology and Pedagogy at Yerevan Valery Brusov State University of Linguistics in 1983 and in Russian Literature at YSU in 1984.
- Defended a candidate’s thesis in 1986 on the topic of Alexander Blok's Armenian translations.
- Studied Hungarian language and literature in Budapest from 1987 to 1988 under a writer-translator exchange program.
- In 2006, researched India’s experience with "Development Journalism" in New Delhi.
- Attended advanced courses for screenwriters and directors in Moscow (2007-2008). Diploma project: screenplay for the feature film Adolf Hitler: Life After Death (advisor: Alexander Mindadze).

=== Career ===
In the 1980s, worked at Yerevan Drama Theater as a literary advisor, at the Armenian Writers' Union as a literary consultant, and at Literary Newspaper as a department head and special correspondent for the disaster zone.

1984 to 1986: taught Russian literature at YSU.

1990s:, served as deputy editor-in-chief of Hayk weekly and later as a parliamentary correspondent.

1993: appointed Deputy Head of the State Radio and Television Committee of Armenia, overseeing television.

1995: resigned from the government position. From 1996 to 1999, served as Vice President and Acting Executive Director of the newly founded AR private television company, where he created and hosted informational, political, and cultural programs.

2001: founded and edited Bnagir magazine, responding to an invitation from a group of writers. Co-founded with poetess Violet Grigoryan. The magazine became a recognized center for Armenian non-conformist culture during its five years of existence.

2003: developed and taught a special course titled The Separation of Literature from the State at the Yerevan Brusov State University of Languages and Social Sciences, funded by a Central European University grant.

2004: hosted the daily program Revolution on Kentron TV.

2010: taught Mastery Lessons at YSU and screenwriting at the Golden Apricot Film Festival's film school.

2011 to 2021: led the Lratun media museum project at the Media Initiatives Center, curating several exhibitions, including:

- The Earthquake That Shook Soviet Media (2013), dedicated to the coverage of the 1988 earthquake.
- Media Fight Against Corruption (2018), covering seven high-profile corruption cases in the media.
- Without Censorship: The Fatal Eights (2020), focusing on media and political upheavals in 1988, 1998, 2008, and 2018.
- The Man in the Palm? A Journalist’s Perspective (2022), addressing overlooked human rights and societal stereotypes.

2021: elected a member of the Council of Public Broadcaster, resigning in 2024, citing insufficient effectiveness in the role.

2022: conducted the Mastery of Writing course at the Eurasia Partnership Foundation.

2022-2023: hosted Discoveries, an authorial program on Boon TV, analyzing works of the 1990s and 2000s generations through a narrative approach.

2003: spent August 2023 in Sos village, Artsakh, publishing the Borderland Country article series in Aliq Media.

In October 2023, visited Budapest under the EU4Culture program grant and published the Hungarian Diary series in Aliq Media, exploring four Hungarian writers’ connections to totalitarianism through creative, personal, and geographical contexts.

2022-2023: filmed two movies and three programs titled Ukraine: The War of Everyone, which aired multiple times on Azatutyun.

2023-2024: hosted the Excavations podcast on EVN Report, presenting Armenian history from the 6th century BC to the 18th century AD using rare sources and visual materials.

=== Politics ===
Organized one of the rare late-Brezhnev-era demonstrations in 1978, supporting the Armenian community of Beirut during the Lebanese Civil War.

Attempted to organize protests against the Soviet government’s secret decision to mandate teaching professional subjects in Russian in national universities in 1979, which were thwarted by the KGB.

Blocked by state security services from transferring to another university (Sverdlovsk, 1979), traveling as a tourist to capitalist countries (Finland, 1986; Greece, 1988), and faced phone tapping, mail surveillance, and personal life interference.

Worked as a political journalist from the early years of the national movement until 2000. Hosted the Political Week program on state radio from 1992-1993, the first live political broadcast of its kind.

Wrote columns and article series in Hayk and Aravot newspapers from 1990-1996.

Hosted Political Solitaire on state television before the 1995 parliamentary elections, which was publicly criticized as one-sided. The author acknowledged the criticism, explaining that opposition journalists who initially agreed to participate later withdrew.

Disillusioned by the government’s failure to implement radical reforms after its election victory, he resigned from his position as head of political and informational programs on state television.

Hosted Trail, a political talk show, in 1997-1998, which quickly gained a large audience.

In 2004, invited to Kentron TV, where he launched the daily program Revolution. The program was canceled after just two months by a presidential emissary (Aravot, 14.01.2005). Since then, he has faced restrictions on his professional work in television, which remains under strict government control.

Has never been a member of any political party.

== Publications ==
Started writing poetry at an early age. Also engaged in prose during school and university years but resumed after a 20-year hiatus. A similar pattern occurred in the field of dramaturgy. The first play, "The Problem Requires Knowing", was written in 1986, followed by the second, "Addiction", and the third, "Terricon or the Island Effect", in 2011. Publications began at a young age, primarily in Garun magazine. Several poems with political undertones were censored. The first poetry collection, in accordance with Soviet "age-related censorship" laws, was published at the age of thirty. Not a member of any creative union.

=== Prose ===
- "Excavations from Armenian History," essays, Actual Art, 2024.
- "Cotton Walls," novel, Actual Art, 2019.
- "Love in Moscow," novel, Antares, 2015.
- "Osama: The Final Transformation," novel, unpublished, 2006.
- "Owls," collection of novellas, Printinfo, Yerevan, 2005.
- "Escape from the Promised Land," Internews-Tigran Mets, novella-pamphlet, 2004.
- "Fragments," short stories, European History, novella, part of Bnagir journal issue, 2003.
- "Disguised for the Cross," historical novel, Printinfo, Yerevan, 2002.
- "Landslide," novel, Apollon, Yerevan, 2000.

=== Poetry ===
- "Leaning on the Half of Your Dream," Yerevan, 2022.
- "Bent Over the Tables," Nairi, Yerevan, 1996.
- "Emotional Logbook," Yerevan, Soviet Writer, 1988.

=== Translated Works ===
English

- An excerpt of the novel Cotton Walls [Բամբակե պատեր (Bambake pater)], Actual Art, 2019, and short stories in the anthology A Drop in the Sea by Edit Print 2022, pp. 81-108.
- Landslide (Սողանք, Chapters 1-2), Emily Artinian: From Ararat to Angeltown, London, 2005.

German

- Die Eulen, an excerpt of the story, in the anthology Bitte Regen! by Wieser Verlag, Vienna, 2011, pp. 74-83.

French

- Vahram Martirosyan, L’Imbecile, Paris, 2010.
- Vahram Martirosyan, Glissement de Terrain, novel, Les 400 coups, France, L'Instant Meme, Quebec, Canada, 2007. Translated from Armenian by Denis Donikian.

Hungarian

- Vahram Martiroszjan: Földcsuszamlás, Nagyvilág, August 2003, translated by Bratka László (First ten chapters of Սողանք translated by László Bratka).
- Vahram Martiroszjan: Földcsuszamlás, Székelyföld, November 2003, translated by Bratka László.
- Vahram Martiroszjan: Golyó a Robotnak, in the anthology Galaktika 92, published by Móra Ferenc Ifjúsági Könyvkiadó, 1992.
- Vahram Martiroszjan: Poems in Vigilia, poetry journal, February 1990.
- Vahram Martiroszjan: Golyó a Robotnak, Galaktika magazine, 1988, Issue #5 ("Bullet for the Robot", science fiction novella).

Russian

- "Яков все еще жив" (Jacob is still alive), Дружба народов magazine, essay, 2008, Issue No. 3.
- "Оползни" (Landslide novel translation), Дружба народов magazine, novel, 2005, Issue No. 2. Translated by Sonia Babajanyan.
- "Mobility," Дружба народов magazine, novella, 2008, Issue No. 10. Translated by Sonia Babajanyan.

Azerbaijani

- Sürüsmalar (Սողանք), Sənət (Art) weekly newspaper, 2005-2006.

== Translations ==
You can find a list of this author's translations in the "Translators" section of the Translation Art database.

- György Petri, Without, poems, translated from Hungarian. Yerevan, Actual Art, 2010.
- János Pilinszky, On the Forbidden Star, poems, essays, translated from Hungarian. Printinfo, 2005.
- Hungarian Literature: In Foreign Literature magazine, Issues #6-7, 2007. Translation, compilation, foreword.
- Jenő Rejtő, The 14-Carat Car, novel, translated from Hungarian. Published in Republic of Armenia newspaper, Issues #151-172, Paper and Ink supplement, Issues #23-39, 1993.
- Paul Verlaine and other authors, French Poetry, anthology, Yerevan State University, 1986.
- Alexander Blok, Innokenty Annensky, and others, Early 20th Century Russian Poetry, Yerevan State University, 1982.
- Numerous other translations of poetry and prose from French, Russian, and Hungarian have been published in periodicals.

== Dramaturgy ==
- The Problem Requires Knowing, TV play, directed by the author, Armenian State Television, 1993.
- The Island Effect (Terricon), tragicomedy, 2011, unperformed.

=== Screenplays ===
Produced

- Landslide, KinoCenter, Armenia. Co-author.
- Churchill, detective series, RTR, 2010. Co-author.
- The Invisible Death of Armenian Literature, Armenian Television, 1995.
- Ukraine in the Shadow of War. 5 films shouted in Ukraine. Scriptwriter, interviewer, director, 2023. Shown by the Armenian section of Radio Liberty.

Purchased by Film Studios

- Kremlin Clans: Treasure Theft, Part One, for NTV. Documentary drama. Co-author. 2011. (Russian).
- Charents, 8-part TV feature film. Sharm Company. Author.
- The Ship on the Mountain, historical-adventure feature film about the Battle of Sardarapat. Sharm Company. Author. (Russian).
- Compromise, feature film based on Sergey Dovlatov's short story collection of the same name. Paradiz Company, Moscow. Author. (Russian).
- Other Times. (Russian).

In the Archive

- Adolf H: Life After Death. Tragicomedy.
- Addiction. Adventure comedy.
- Film 600 Years Later, historical-documentary epic, 180 minutes, AR Television, author, 1996-97.

=== Roles ===
- Mesrop Mashtots in Don Askarian's Avetik. 1992. Armenia-Germany.
- Loghlogh in Samvel Avetisyan’s Three Sailors in a Sweltering Desert. Hayfilm, 1991.
- Blind Monk in Levon Shant’s Ancient Gods. "Yerevan" Theatre-Studio. Directed by Hamlet Hovhannisyan.

== Articles and Essays ==
- Remote Control: Dangers and Delights of Armenian TV Surfing, in Public Spheres After Socialism, London, Intellect, 2007.
- Everyone's War Apr 24, 2023 By Vahram Martirosyan; Everyone's War - War Street Journal
- Dozens of other articles and interviews in various newspapers.

== Awards ==
- Balint Balassi Memorial Sword Award: 2020
