= Sándor Csoóri =

Hungarian poet, essayist, writer and politician

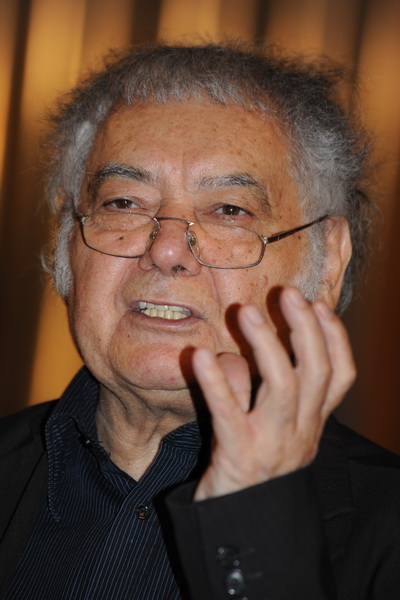
- Born: 3 February 1930; Zámoly, Hungary
- Died: 12 September 2016 (aged 86); Üröm, Hungary
- Children: Sándor

Sándor Csoóri (3 February 1930 – 12 September 2016) was a Hungarian poet, essayist, writer, and politician.

== Biography ==
In 1950, he graduated from the Reformed College in the town of Pápa (hu:Pápai Református Kollégium) and then studied at ELTE Institute, but dropped his studies because of illness. He worked in various journals, such as, during 1953-54, The Literary Newspaper and, from 1955 until 1956, he was the poetry section editor in "The New Sound" periodical. In 1956, he could not find work for a while and then, in 1960, as at the beginning of the Budapest University of Technology and newspaper editorial staff, he was the MAFILM dramaturg from 1968 until 1988.

His first poems appeared in 1953, raising a big stir, being critical of the Rákosi era. The authorities soon noticed that Csoóri was not one of their supporters. He wrote criticizing the dictatorship's impact of personality, and the fate of rural people. He was under surveillance sometimes for years, and did not receive awards. He lived in Budapest, where he met with his friends, including Miklós Jancsó, Ottó Orbán, György Konrád, Ferenc Kósa. In 1988, he was co-editor with Gáspár Nagy, of Hitel, and in 1992 editor-in-chief.

Csoóri died at the age of 86 after a long illness on 12 September 2016.

== Awards ==
- Attila József Prize (1954, 1970)
- Herder Prize (1981)
- István Bibó Prize (1984)
- The Book of the Year Award (1985, 1995, 2004)
- Tibor Déry Prize (1987)
- Joseph Fitz Award (1989)
- Kossuth Prize (1990, 2012)
- Sower Nívódíja Publishing (1990)
- Radnóti Biennial Poetry prize (1990)
- Eeva Joenpelto Award (1995)
- Károli Gáspár Award (1997)
- Hungarian Heritage Award (1997, 2005)
- Order of Merit of the Republic of Hungary, Commander's Crosses with Star, civilian (hu:A Magyar Köztársasági Érdemrend középkeresztje a csillaggal, 2000)
- Hungarian Art Prize (2004)
- Bálint Balassi Memorial Sword Award (2006)
- Prima Primissima Award, 2008

== Works in English ==
- "Letter to the American Poet, Gregory Corso", AGNI
- "A Hidden Self-Portrait"; "A Wind-Crown on My Head"; "Devastation", "I Hunt Yellow Bird", The Drunken Boat
- The Selected Poems of Sándor Csoóri. Port Townsend: Copper Canyon Press. 1992. ISBN 978-1-55659-047-4.
- Sándor Csoóri (2004). Before and After the Fall: New Poems. Rochester: BOA Editions, Ltd. ISBN 978-1-929918-46-1.
