= Ganbold Davaakhuugiin =

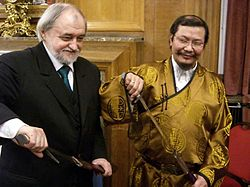
- Ganbold Davaakhuugiin (right) with István Tari
- Born: August 16, 1962 (age 64)
- Occupations: literary historian, literary translator

Ganbold Davaakhuugiin (referred to as Sárosdi Davaakhuu Ganbold or as Daváhügijn Ganbold in Hungarian; born 16 August 1962) is a Mongolian literary historian and literary translator. He is known for his translations of Hungarian literature into Mongolian.

== Biography ==
Davaakhuugiin was born in Mongolia on 16 August 1962. He went to Hungary in 1989 and received university MA degree at the Faculty of Arts at Loránd Eötvös University. His majors were Hungarian Language and Literature and Oriental Studies. In 2008 a literary anthology was published from his translations by TIMP Publishing Company in Hungary, containing poetry and prose by 83 authors. In 2001 he translated the drama Wonderful Beasts by Laszlo Garaczi. In 2004 he translated Fatelessness, the Literary Nobel Prize winner novel by Imre Kertesz. In 2005 he initiated the establishment of a Hungarian Language and Literature Department at the Ulaanbaatar State University. In 2006 the Mongolian Academic Drama Theatre performed in his translation Istvan Orkeny’s drama The Tots. In 2006 he was awarded the Pro Cultura Hungarica prize for his translations. His work of literary translation was promoted by several Hungarian cultural grants: in 1997-2000 he received the PhD Studies Scholarship from the Hungarian Ministry of Education, in 2000 the Fust Milan Translation Award by the Hungarian Academy of Sciences, in 1999-2000 the Soros Supplementary Grant Scholarship, in 1999 the Pro Renovanda Cultura Hungariae Foundation’s „Art in Education” scholarship, in 2001 the Hungarian National Cultural Fund's Literary scholarship, in 2010 the National Scholarship Fund's Art scholarship. He was granted scholarships several times by the Hungarian Translators’ House. In 2009 he received the Balint Balassi Memorial Sword Award, and became a member of the award's advisory board. In 2010 he received the Prize of the Union of Mongolian Writers for his translations and literary activities. He has been living in Ulaanbaatar since October 2010 where he has founded and is the Editor in Chief of the Mongolian Lettre Internationale, the Mongolian edition of the European cultural magazine Lettre Internationale.
