= Mihály Babák =

Hungarian politician

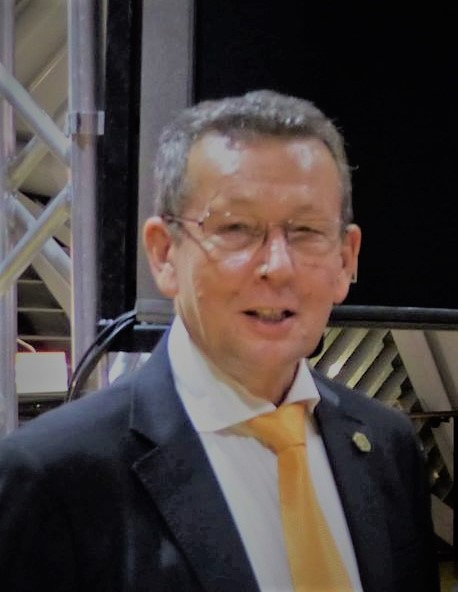
- Portrait of Babák Mihály.

Member of the National Assembly
- In office 18 June 1998 – 5 May 2014

Personal details
- Born: 12 November 1947 (age 78) Szarvas, Hungary
- Party: Fidesz
- Children: Petra Mária
- Profession: politician

Mihály Babák (born 12 November 1947) is a Hungarian politician, member of the National Assembly (MP) between 1998 and 2014.

== Biography ==
Babák was born in Szarvas on 12 November 1947. He acquired building industry technician's qualifications in Veres István Building Industrial Secondary Technical School in Szeged in 1966. In 1978, he passed the master's qualification examination in the trades of carpentry and masonry. In 1983, he graduated from the College of Public Administration of Budapest as an administration manager, then obtained a diploma in finance administration management in 1989. He was a student in the specialist economist programme of the College of Trade and Catering in 1992.

Babák graduated as a community management engineer from Debrecen University of Agriculture in 1998. He worked as a draftsman planner for the Bács-Kiskun County Planning Institute from 1966-69. He was the technical manager of the Szarvas Building Industrial Cooperative from 1969-75. He worked as technical manager of the Szarvas Budget Unit from 1975, then held the position of deputy managing director of the City Management Ltd. and was the head of the communal city management branch.

He was elected a local representative in Szarvas in October 1990 and has been on the body of representatives since. He joined Fidesz in 1993. He has presided over the Szarvas local party branch since 1994 and has been deputy president of the party's Békés County organisation since 1996. He was a candidate in the 1994 parliamentary elections. In the 1998 parliamentary elections, he was third on the Békés County list of Fidesz, which secured him the position of MP. He was elected mayor of Szarvas in 1998.

In 2002, he was awarded the title of Mayor of the Year. In the national elections of April 2002 he was again elected from the Békés County party list. He has served on the Budget and Finance Committee since May of the same year. In the local elections on 20 October 2002 he was elected incumbent mayor of Szarvas and member of the local body of representatives.

Babák was elected MP from Békés county regional list in 2006 and 2010 elections. He was a member of Committee on Budget, Finance and Audit Office. After incompatibility law came into force, he decided not to run for another parliamentary term and chose his mayoral position. He was elected mayor of Szarvas for a fifth term in October 2014.

== Personal life ==
Babák is married and has a daughter, Petra Mária Babák.
