= Ganbold Lundeg =

Mongolian anesthetist

Ganbold Lundeg (born 2 January 1956 (age 70)) is a Mongolian anesthetist based at the Mongolian National University of Medical Sciences where he is Head of Critical Care Medicine and Anesthesia Department. He has been the president of the Mongolian Society of Anesthesiologists for several years, and is a member of The Lancet Commission on Global Surgery.

He is a member of the Society of Critical Care Medicine with a substantial portfolio of clinical research publications.
