= Pal Molnar =

Hungarian journalist

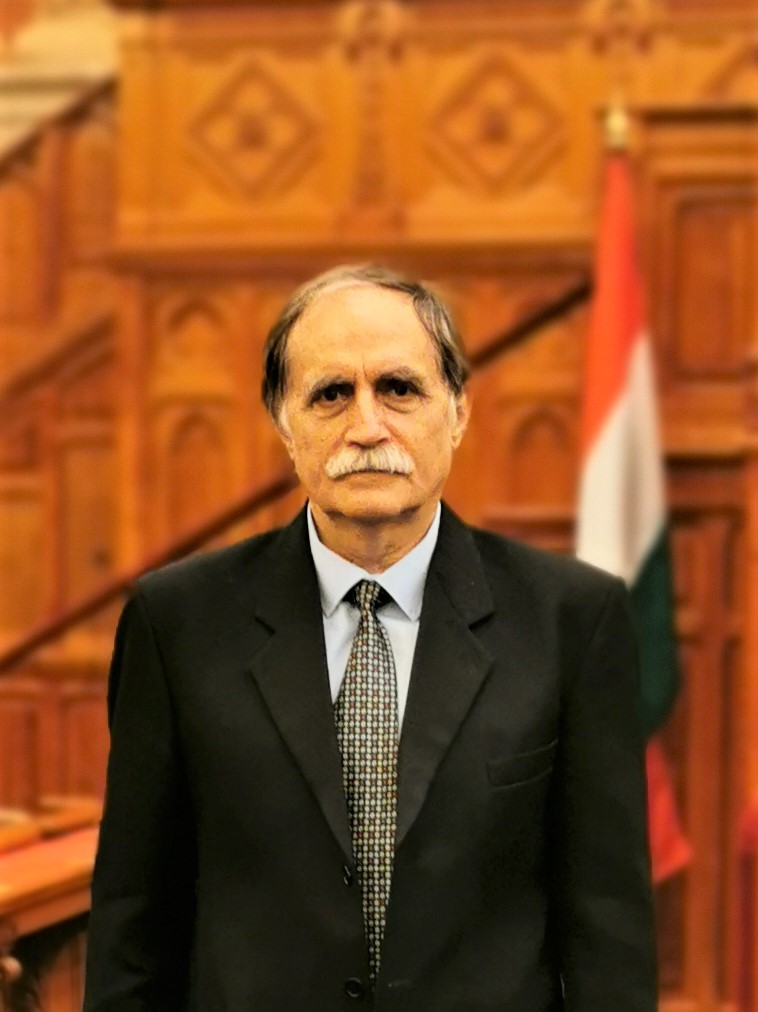
Pál Molnár

Pal Molnar (born October 1952) is a Hungarian journalist and founder of art awards. The native form of his name is Molnár Pál (Molnár Pál).

== Biography ==
Graduated from the grammar, literature and history faculty of the Teacher Training College in Eger. Journalist since 1977, mainly dealing with economic issues. Author of 21 books, mostly on national strategic and literature issues.

Worked in print journalism and on television; now president of the Balassi Sword Art Foundation.

In 1997, he founded the Balint Balassi Memorial Sword Award. This literary prize has included an award for translation since 2002. Since then, it has become a prestigious literary award in Hungary. A literary festival and wine competition and Balassi mass have been associated with it since 2005.

Subsequently, he founded fine art, film, journalism and wine awards, in cooperation with Hungarian artists. He organizes the handover ceremonies every year.

Since 1978, member of the Association of Hungarian Journalists. Since 1992, a member of the Knights of St. George. Founding member of the Baross Gábor Supporting Economic Society.

His wife is Katalin Szánthó Molnár.

He is the organizer of the Balassi-mass.

== Books in Hungary ==
- Innen az Óperencián, 1998
- Az Unió kapujában, 1999
- Ütközet az ezredvégen, 2000
- A dicsőség pillanatai, 2000
- Dunaferr: bajsikertörténet, 2001
- Európai demokraták, 2001
- Európai ezredkezdet, 2002
- Kardtársak, 2002
- Áttörés a médiában, 2005
- Az országépítő, 2006
- A gyökerektől a koronáig, 2007
- A művészet őszinte mély hit, 2008
- A Szent Korona vonzásában, 2011
- A dallá vált szavak, 2014
- Balassi kardtársai, 2016
- Hinni és hihetni egymásnak, 2018
- Vendég a Présházban, 2019
- Rímek szablyaélen, 2020
- Gyöngyös – A Mátra kapuja, 2021

== Awards ==
- Teleki Pál Service Medal
- József Eötvös Press Award
- Officer's Cross of the Knights of St. George
- Hungarian Order of Merit, Knight's cross
- Award Andra Levai
