= Zala County 1st constituency =

Parliamentary constituency in Hungary

- Constituency for the National Assembly
- Location of Zala county 01 within Zala county

- Location of Zala county within Hungary
- County: Zala County
- Population: 88,717 (2022)
- Major settlements: Zalaegerszeg

Current constituency
- Created: 2011
- Party: Tisza Party
- Member: Márta Nagy
- Elected: 2026

The Zala County 1st parliamentary constituency is one of the 106 constituencies into which the territory of Hungary is divided by Act CCIII of 2011, and in which voters can elect one member of parliament. The standard abbreviation of the name of the constituency is: Zala 01. OEVK. Seat: Zalaegerszeg.

== Area ==
The constituency includes the following settlements:

1. Alsószenterzsébet
2. Babosdöbréte
3. Baglad
4. Bagod
5. Bak
6. Barlahida
7. Becsvölgye
8. Belsősárd
9. Bocfölde
10. Boncodfölde
11. Böde
12. Bödeháza
13. Csatár
14. Csesztreg
15. Csonkahegyhát
16. Csöde
17. Dobronhegy
18. Felsőszenterzsébet
19. Gáborjánháza
20. Gellénháza
21. Gombosszeg
22. Gosztola
23. Hagyárosbörönd
24. Hernyék
25. Hottó
26. Iborfia
27. Kálócfa
28. Kávás
29. Keménfa
30. Kerkabarabás
31. Kerkafalva
32. Kerkakutas
33. Kiskutas
34. Kispáli
35. Kozmadombja
36. Kustánszeg
37. Külsősárd
38. Lendvadedes
39. Lendvajakabfa
40. Lenti
41. Lickóvadamos
42. Magyarföld
43. Márokföld
44. Mikekarácsonyfa
45. Milejszeg
46. Nagykutas
47. Nagylengyel
48. Nagypáli
49. Nemesnép
50. Németfalu
51. Nova
52. Ormándlak
53. Ozmánbük
54. Pálfiszeg
55. Petrikeresztúr
56. Pórszombat
57. Pusztaapáti
58. Ramocsa
59. Rédics
60. Resznek
61. Salomvár
62. Sárhida
63. Szentgyörgyvölgy
64. Szijártóháza
65. Szilvágy
66. Teskánd
67. Vaspör
68. Zalabaksa
69. Zalaboldogfa
70. Zalacséb
71. Zalaegerszeg
72. Zalaháshágy
73. Zalalövő
74. Zalaszentgyörgy
75. Zalaszombatfa
76. Zalatárnok

== Members of parliament ==
Election	Member	Party	%
2014	László Vigh	Fidesz	
2018	László Vigh	Fidesz	
2022	László Vigh	Fidesz	56.80
2026	Márta Nagy	Tisza	51.54

== Demographics ==
Historical population
Year	Pop.	±%
2011	95,976	—
2022	88,717	−7.6%

The demographics of the constituency are as follows. The population of Zala County No. 1 constituency was 88,717 on 1 October 2022. The population of the constituency decreased by 7,259 between the 2011 and 2022 censuses. Based on the age composition, the majority of the population in the constituency is middle-aged with 33,889 people, while the least is children with 13,643 people. 82.9% of the population of the constituency has internet access.

According to the highest level of completed education, those with a high school diploma are the most numerous, with 26,711 people, followed by skilled workers with 19,284 people.

According to economic activity, almost half of the population is employed, 43,957 people, the second most significant group is inactive earners, who are mainly pensioners, with 23,633 people.

The most significant ethnic group in the constituency is German with 922 people and Gypsy with 728 people. The proportion of foreign citizens without Hungarian citizenship is 1.9%.

According to religious composition, the largest religion of the residents of the constituency is Roman Catholic (35,327 people), and a significant community is the Calvinist (2,466 people). The number of those not belonging to a religious community is also significant (6,361 people), the second largest group in the constituency after the Roman Catholic religion.

== Sources ==
- ↑ Vjt.: "2011. évi CCIII. törvény az országgyűlési képviselők választásáról". Nemzeti Jogszabálytár. Magyar Közlöny Lap- és Könyvkiadó Kft.
- ↑ KSH: "Az országgyűlési egyéni választókerületek adatai". Népszámlálás 2011. Központi Statisztikai Hivatal.
