= Lenti District =

Lenti District Lenti járás
- Districts of Hungary
- Coat of arms

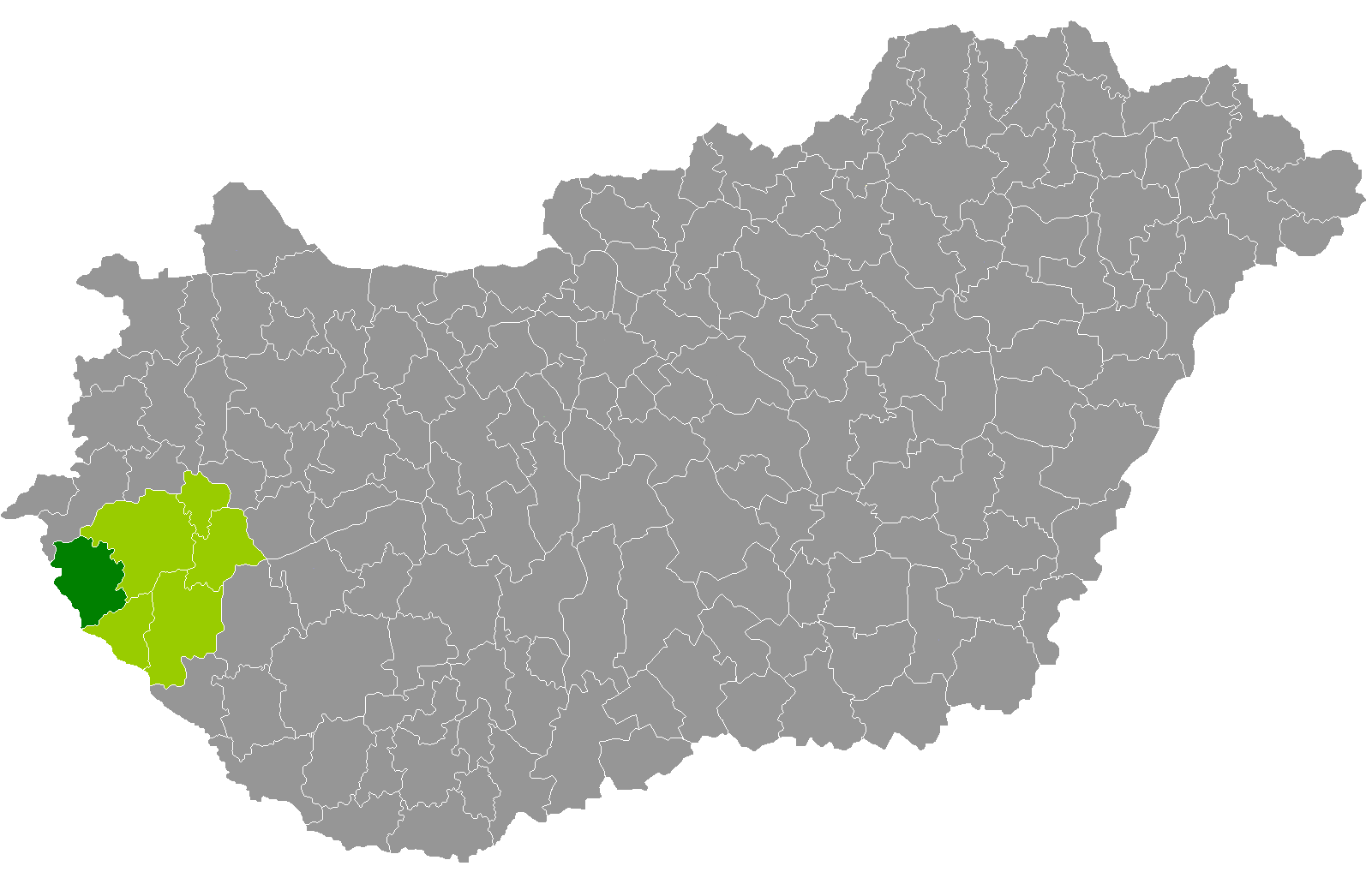
- Lenti District within Hungary and Zala County.
- Coordinates: 46.62°N 16.54°E
- Country: Hungary
- County: Zala
- District seat: Lenti

Area
  - Total: 624.12 km^{2} (240.97 sq mi)
  - Rank: 3rd in Zala

Population (2011 census)
  - Total: 19,789
  - Rank: 4th in Zala
  - Density: 32/km^{2} (83/sq mi)

Lenti (Hungarian: Lenti járás) is a district in Zala County. Lenti is also the name of the town where the district seat is found. The district is located in the Western Transdanubia Statistical Region.

== Geography ==
Lenti District borders with Körmend District (Vas County) to the north, Zalaegerszeg District to the east, Letenye District to the south, Slovenia to the west. The number of the inhabited places in Lenti District is 48.

== Municipalities ==
The district has 1 town and 47 villages. (ordered by population, as of 1 January 2013)

- Alsószenterzsébet (57)
- Baglad (50)
- Barlahida (120)
- Belsősárd (97)
- Bödeháza (43)
- Csesztreg (860)
- Csömödér (636)
- Dobri (155)
- Felsőszenterzsébet (17)
- Gáborjánháza (71)
- Gosztola (54)
- Hernyék (101)
- Iklódbördőce (281)
- Kálócfa (160)
- Kányavár (122)
- Kerkabarabás (276)
- Kerkafalva (100)
- Kerkakutas (126)
- Kerkateskánd (169)
- Kissziget (189)
- Kozmadombja (51)
- Külsősárd (69)
- Lendvadedes (25)
- Lendvajakabfa (19)
- **Lenti** (7,961) – district seat
- Lovászi (1,242)
- Magyarföld (29)
- Márokföld (43)
- Mikekarácsonyfa (277)
- Nemesnép (118)
- Nova (821)
- Ortaháza (108)
- Páka (1,156)
- Pórszombat (290)
- Pördefölde (52)
- Pusztaapáti (27)
- Ramocsa (31)
- Resznek (279)
- Rédics (916)
- Szécsisziget (218)
- Szentgyörgyvölgy (427)
- Szijártóháza (28)
- Szilvágy (182)
- Tormafölde (323)
- Tornyiszentmiklós (607)
- Zalabaksa (689)
- Zalaszombatfa (45)
- Zebecke (66)

The bolded municipality is city.

== See also ==
- List of cities and towns in Hungary
