= List of populated places in Hungary (L) =

This is a list of cities, towns and villages of Hungary

KEY: T = Town ; V = Village

Name	Rank	County	District	Population	Post code
Lábatlan	V	Komárom-Esztergom	Esztergomi	5,386	2541
Lábod	V	Somogy	Nagyatádi	2,247	7551
Lácacséke	V	Borsod-Abaúj-Zemplén	Bodrogközi	389	3967
Lad	V	Somogy	Barcsi	684	7535
Ladánybene	V	Bács-Kiskun	Kecskeméti	1,732	6045
Ládbesenyő	V	Borsod-Abaúj-Zemplén	Edelényi	325	3780
Lajoskomárom	V	Fejér	Enyingi	2,336	8136
Lajosmizse	T	Bács-Kiskun	Kecskeméti	11,165	6050
Lak	V	Borsod-Abaúj-Zemplén	Edelényi	605	3786
Lakhegy	V	Zala	Zalaegerszegi	513	8913
Lakitelek	V	Bács-Kiskun	Kecskeméti	4,468	6065
Lakócsa	V	Somogy	Barcsi	624	7918
Lánycsók	V	Baranya	Mohácsi	2,745	7759
Lápafő	V	Tolna	Dombóvári	197	7214
Lapáncsa	V	Baranya	Siklósi	226	7775
Laskod	V	Szabolcs-Szatmár-Bereg	Baktalórántházai	1,087	4543
Lasztonya	V	Zala	Letenyei	86	8887
Látrány	V	Somogy	Fonyódi	1,338	8681
Lázi	V	Győr-Moson-Sopron	Pannonhalmi	618	9089
Leányfalu	V	Pest	Szentendrei	2,589	2016
Leányvár	V	Komárom-Esztergom	Dorogi	1,708	2518
Lébény	V	Győr-Moson-Sopron	Mosonmagyaróvári	3,146	9155
Legénd	V	Nógrád	Rétsági	552	2619
Legyesbénye	V	Borsod-Abaúj-Zemplén	Szerencsi	1,684	3904
Léh	V	Borsod-Abaúj-Zemplén	Szikszói	500	3832
Lénárddaróc	V	Borsod-Abaúj-Zemplén	Ózdi	363	3648
Lendvadedes	V	Zala	Lenti	33	8978
Lendvajakabfa	V	Zala	Lenti	34	8977
Lengyel	V	Tolna	Bonyhádi	688	7184
Lengyeltóti	T	Somogy	Lengyeltóti	3,451	8693
Lenti	T	Zala	Lenti	8,541	8960
Lepsény	V	Fejér	Enyingi	3,213	8132
Lesencefalu	V	Veszprém	Tapolcai	326	8318
Lesenceistvánd	V	Veszprém	Tapolcai	1,002	8319
Lesencetomaj	V	Veszprém	Tapolcai	1,121	8318
Létavértes	T	Hajdú-Bihar	Derecske–Létavértesi	7,209	4281
Letenye	T	Zala	Letenyei	4,552	8868
Letkés	V	Pest	Szobi	1,176	2632
Levél	V	Győr-Moson-Sopron	Mosonmagyaróvári	1,696	9221
Levelek	V	Szabolcs-Szatmár-Bereg	Baktalórántházai	2,968	4555
Libickozma	V	Somogy	Marcali	47	8707
Lickóvadamos	V	Zala	Zalaegerszegi	218	8981
Liget	V	Baranya	Komlói	461	7331
Ligetfalva	V	Zala	Zalaszentgróti	55	8782
Lipót	V	Győr-Moson-Sopron	Mosonmagyaróvári	689	9233
Lippó	V	Baranya	Mohácsi	563	7781
Liptód	V	Baranya	Mohácsi	238	7757
Lispeszentadorján	V	Zala	Letenyei	334	8888
Liszó	V	Zala	Nagykanizsai	440	8831
Litér	V	Veszprém	Balatonalmádi	2,056	8196
Litka	V	Borsod-Abaúj-Zemplén	Encsi	69	3866
Litke	V	Nógrád	Salgótarjáni	917	3186
Lócs	V	Vas	Csepregi	123	9634
Lókút	V	Veszprém	Zirci	534	8425
Lónya	V	Szabolcs-Szatmár-Bereg	Vásárosnaményi	855	4836
Lórév	V	Pest	Ráckevei	309	2309
Lothárd	V	Baranya	Pécsi	269	7761
Lovas	V	Veszprém	Balatonalmádi	365	8228
Lovasberény	V	Fejér	Székesfehérvári	2,670	8093
Lovászhetény	V	Baranya	Pécsváradi	324	7720
Lovászi	V	Zala	Lenti	1,316	8878
Lovászpatona	V	Veszprém	Pápai	1,356	8553
Lokösháza	V	Békés	Gyulai	2,044	5743
Lorinci	T	Heves	Hatvani	3,330	3021
Lövo	V	Győr-Moson-Sopron	Sopron–Fertodi	1,435	9461
Lövopetri	V	Szabolcs-Szatmár-Bereg	Kisvárdai	515	4633
Lucfalva	V	Nógrád	Bátonyterenyei	638	3129
Ludányhalászi	V	Nógrád	Szécsényi	1,635	3188
Ludas	V	Heves	Gyöngyösi	1,078	3274
Lukácsháza	V	Vas	Koszegi	1,023	9724
Lulla	V	Somogy	Tabi	271	8660
Lúzsok	V	Baranya	Sellyei	266	7838

== Notes ==
- Cities marked with * have several different post codes, the one here is only the most general one.
