= Zebecke =

- Village
- Flag Coat of arms

- Location of Zebecke
- Coordinates: 46.64359°N 16.68650°E
- Country: Hungary
- Region: Western Transdanubia
- County: Zala
- District: Lenti

Area
  - Total: 4.45 km^{2} (1.72 sq mi)

Population (1 January 2026)
  - Total: 65
  - Density: 15/km^{2} (38/sq mi)
- Time zone: UTC+1 (CET)
  - Summer (DST): UTC+2 (CEST)
- Postal code: 8957
- Area code: (+36) 92

Zebecke is a village in Zala County, Hungary.

== Geography ==
Zebecke is located about 12 km northeast of Lenti, the district seat. The neighboring municipalities are Csertalakos, Mikekarácsonyfa, Ortaháza, and Kissziget.

== History ==
Zebecke was first mentioned in 1328 under the name Zebuske. The village was formerly surrounded by dense forests. Several battles took place in the area around Zebecke during the Ottoman wars. For this reason, the village's coat of arms includes a hand holding a sword and a tree.

The Geographical-Historical Lexicon of Hungary (1786) described Zebecke as a village in Zala County, three miles from Zalaegerszeg, in the larger district of Kapornak. The inhabitants were mainly engaged in agriculture, and the village was owned by Prince Esterházy and Ludwig Erdödy.

In 1907, the village had 54 houses and 301 inhabitants and covered an area of 747 cadastral yokes. At that time, it belonged to the Nova district of Zala County.

The population has steadily declined since 1990. There are now only a few residents under the age of 18, and many buildings are vacant. The village has neither a shop nor a restaurant.

The mayor serves on a voluntary basis, and Zebecke shares an administrative association with the municipality of Csömödér. In addition to the mayor, the local council consists of two elected representatives.

== Sights ==
- The Roman Catholic Kármel-hegyi Boldogasszony Mass chapel, with a separate bell tower
- The Varga stone cross, erected in 1912
