= Kisgörbő =

Coordinates: 46°56′N 17°10′E

- Village
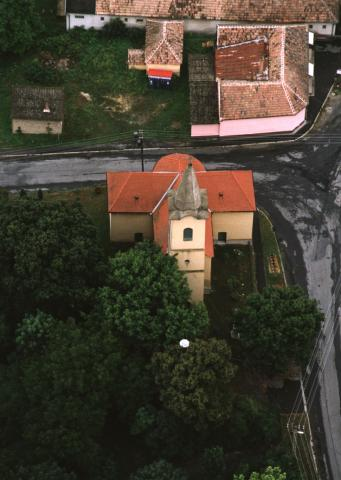
- Kisgörbő
- Interactive map of Kisgörbő
- Country: Hungary
- Region: Western Transdanubia
- County: Zala County
- Time zone: UTC+1 (CET)
  - Summer (DST): UTC+2 (CEST)

Kisgörbő is a village in Zala County, Hungary.
