= Hosszúvölgy =

Coordinates: 46°30′53″N 16°55′58″E

- Village
- Interactive map of Hosszúvölgy
- Country: Hungary
- Region: Western Transdanubia
- County: Zala County
- Time zone: UTC+1 (CET)
  - Summer (DST): UTC+2 (CEST)

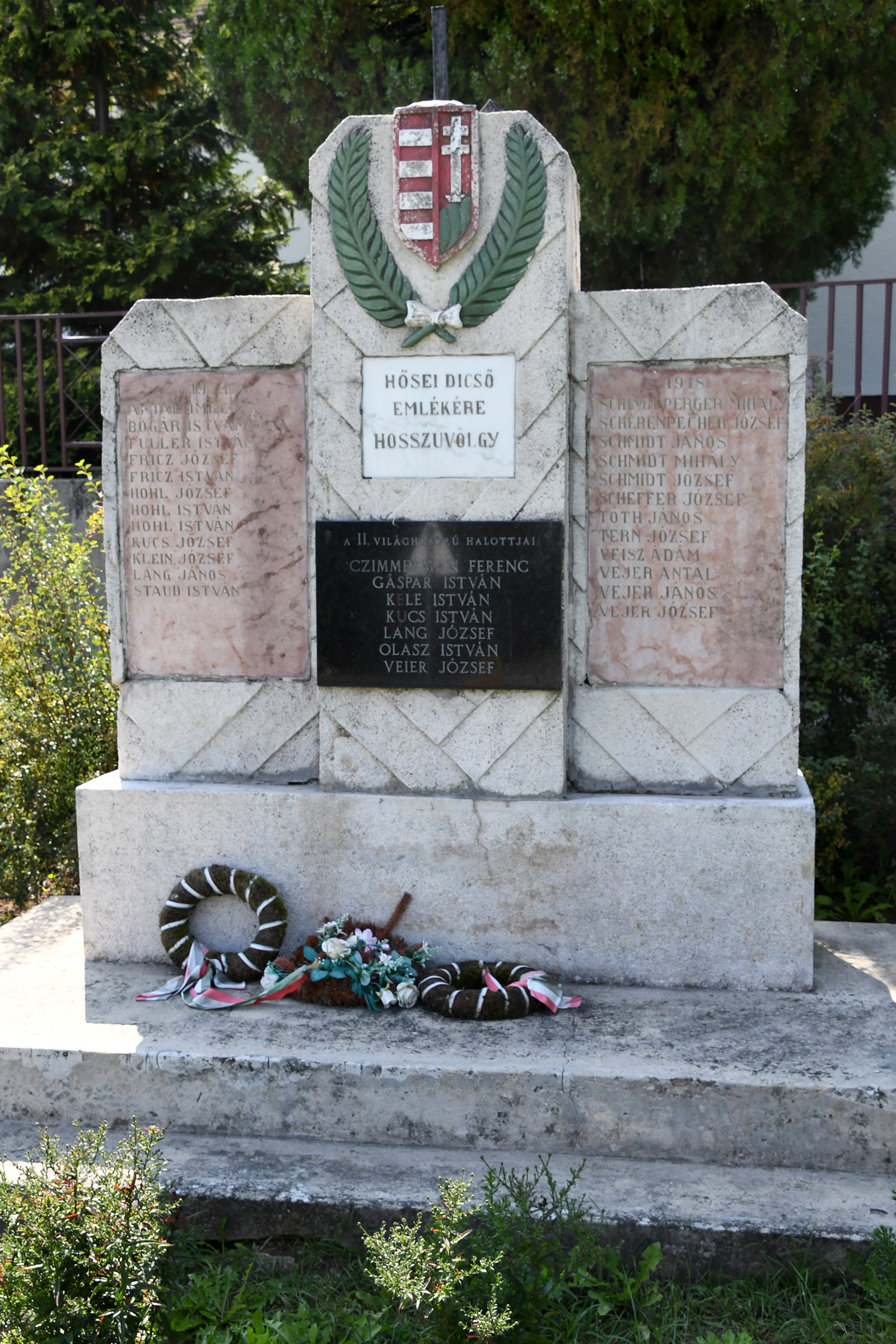
World Wars memorial in Hosszúvölgy, Hungary

Hosszúvölgy is a village in Zala County, Hungary.
