= Sénye =

Coordinates: 46°54′N 17°08′E

- Village
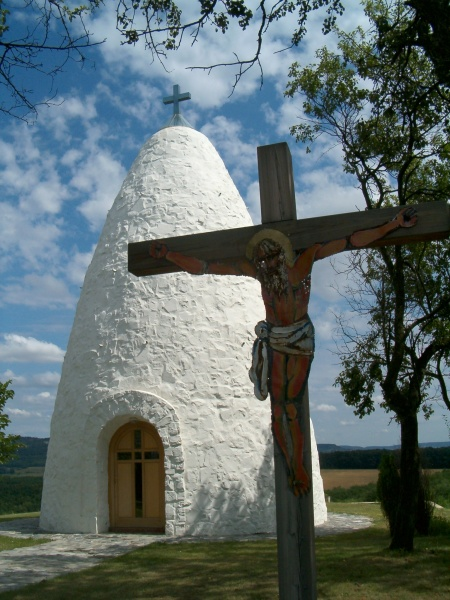
- Senye-kapolna
- Interactive map of Sénye
- Country: Hungary
- Region: Western Transdanubia
- County: Zala County
- Time zone: UTC+1 (CET)
  - Summer (DST): UTC+2 (CEST)

Sénye is a village in Zala County, Hungary.
