= Nagygörbő =

Coordinates: 46°56′N 17°11′E

- Village
- Interactive map of Nagygörbő
- Country: Hungary
- Region: Western Transdanubia
- County: Zala County
- Time zone: UTC+1 (CET)
  - Summer (DST): UTC+2 (CEST)

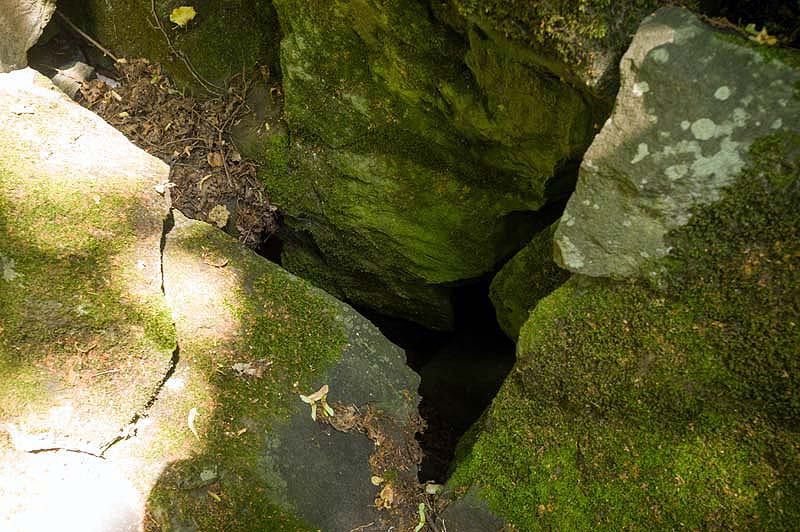
Entrance of Kőajtó Cave in Nagygörbő

Nagygörbő is a village in Zala County, Hungary.
