= Iklódbördőce =

- Village
- Flag Coat of arms

- Location of Iklódbördőce
- Coordinates: 46.604411°N 16.613689°E
- Country: Hungary
- Region: Western Transdanubia
- County: Zala
- District: Lenti

Area
  - Total: 12.3 km^{2} (4.7 sq mi)

Population (1 January 2026)
  - Total: 261
  - Density: 21.2/km^{2} (55.0/sq mi)
- Time zone: UTC+1 (CET)
  - Summer (DST): UTC+2 (CEST)
- Postal code: 8958
- Area code: (+36) 92
- Website: iklodbordoce.hu

Iklódbördőce is a village in Zala County, Hungary.
