= Kálócfa =

- Village
- Flag Coat of arms

- Location of Kálócfa
- Coordinates: 46.75507°N 16.56084°E
- Country: Hungary
- Region: Western Transdanubia
- County: Zala
- District: Lenti

Area
  - Total: 10.21 km^{2} (3.94 sq mi)

Population (1 January 2026)
  - Total: 129
  - Density: 12.6/km^{2} (32.7/sq mi)
- Time zone: UTC+1 (CET)
  - Summer (DST): UTC+2 (CEST)
- Postal code: 8988
- Area code: (+36) 92
- Website: kalocfa.hu

Kálócfa is a village in Zala County, Hungary.
