= Bödeháza =

- Village
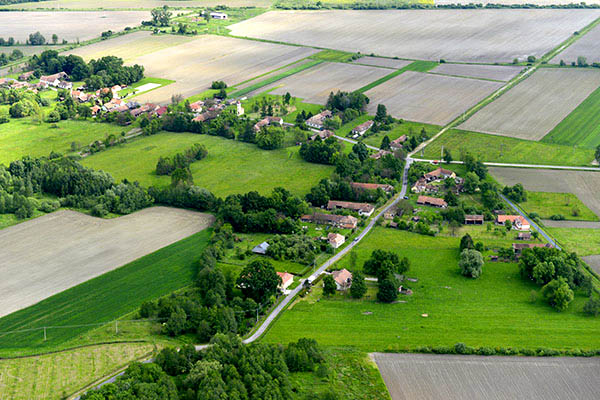

- Flag Coat of arms

- Location of Bödeháza
- Coordinates: 46.64188°N 16.40274°E
- Country: Hungary
- Region: Western Transdanubia
- County: Zala
- District: Lenti

Area
  - Total: 6.67 km^{2} (2.58 sq mi)

Population (1 January 2025)
  - Total: 52
  - Density: 7.8/km^{2} (20/sq mi)
- Time zone: UTC+1 (CET)
  - Summer (DST): UTC+2 (CEST)
- Postal code: 8969
- Area code: (+36) 92

Bödeháza is a village in Zala County, Hungary.
