= Kiskutas =

- Village
- Flag Coat of arms

- Location of Kiskutas
- Coordinates: 46.9128°N 16.7973°E
- Country: Hungary
- Region: Western Transdanubia
- County: Zala
- District: Zalaegerszeg

Area
  - Total: 4.69 km^{2} (1.81 sq mi)

Population (1 January 2026)
  - Total: 181
  - Density: 38.6/km^{2} (100/sq mi)
- Time zone: UTC+1 (CET)
  - Summer (DST): UTC+2 (CEST)
- Postal code: 8911
- Area code: (+36) 92
- Website: kiskutas.hu

Kiskutas is a village in Zala County, Hungary. It has 199 inhabitants (2001).
