= Márokföld =

- Village
- Flag Coat of arms

- Location of Márokföld
- Coordinates: 46.71593°N 16.44376°E
- Country: Hungary
- Region: Western Transdanubia
- County: Zala
- District: Lenti

Area
  - Total: 7.44 km^{2} (2.87 sq mi)

Population (1 January 2026)
  - Total: 62
  - Density: 8.3/km^{2} (22/sq mi)
- Time zone: UTC+1 (CET)
  - Summer (DST): UTC+2 (CEST)
- Postal code: 8976
- Area code: (+36) 92
- Website: www.magyarfold-falu.hu

Márokföld is a village in Zala County, Hungary. It has a population of 56 people. The mayor since june 2024 is Noémi Gaál.
