= Gáborjánháza =

- Village
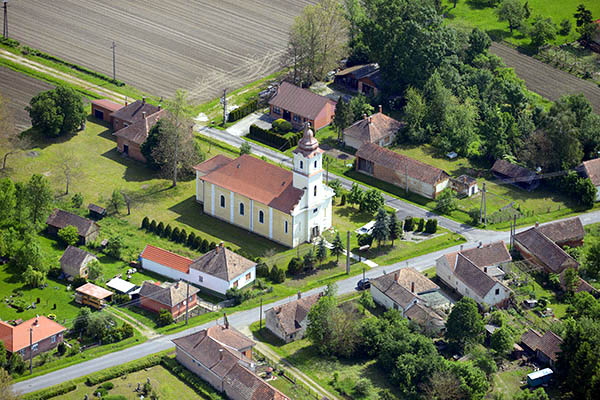

- Flag Coat of arms

- Location of Gáborjánháza
- Coordinates: 46.63244°N 16.41937°E
- Country: Hungary
- Region: Western Transdanubia
- County: Zala
- District: Lenti

Area
  - Total: 5.07 km^{2} (1.96 sq mi)

Population (1 January 2025)
  - Total: 69
  - Density: 14/km^{2} (35/sq mi)
- Time zone: UTC+1 (CET)
  - Summer (DST): UTC+2 (CEST)
- Postal code: 8969
- Area code: (+36) 92

Gáborjánháza is a village in Zala County, Hungary.
