= Szécsisziget =

Coordinates: 46°34′N 16°36′E

- Village
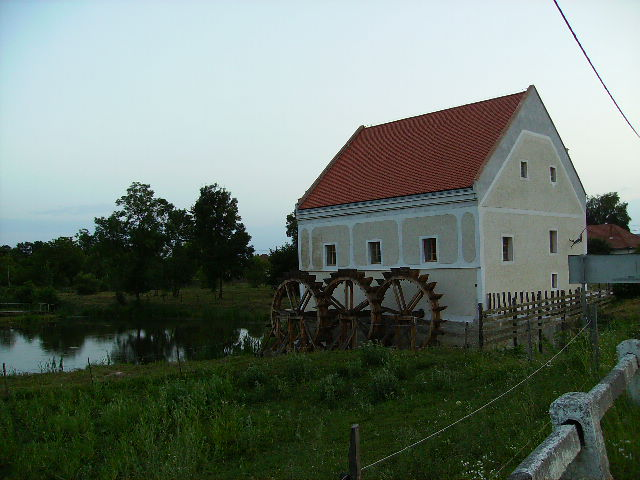
- Watermill in Szécsisziget
- Interactive map of Szécsisziget
- Country: Hungary
- Region: Western Transdanubia
- County: Zala County
- Time zone: UTC+1 (CET)
  - Summer (DST): UTC+2 (CEST)

Szécsisziget is a village in Zala County, Hungary.
