= Külsősárd =

- Village
- Flag Coat of arms

- Location of Külsősárd
- Coordinates: 46.627781°N 16.486111°E
- Country: Hungary
- Region: Western Transdanubia
- County: Zala
- District: Lenti

Area
  - Total: 1.52 km^{2} (0.59 sq mi)

Population (1 January 2026)
  - Total: 57
  - Density: 38/km^{2} (97/sq mi)
- Time zone: UTC+1 (CET)
  - Summer (DST): UTC+2 (CEST)
- Postal code: 8978
- Area code: (+36) 92

Külsősárd is a village in Zala County, Hungary.
