= Kerkabarabás =

Kerkabarabás Barabaš (in Slovene)
- Village
- Flag Coat of arms

- Location of Kerkabarabás
- Coordinates: 46.6782°N 16.55276°E
- Country: Hungary
- Region: Western Transdanubia
- County: Zala
- District: Lenti

Area
  - Total: 10.29 km^{2} (3.97 sq mi)

Population (1 January 2026)
  - Total: 271
  - Density: 26.3/km^{2} (68.2/sq mi)
- Time zone: UTC+1 (CET)
  - Summer (DST): UTC+2 (CEST)
- Postal code: 8971
- Area code: (+36) 92
- Website: kerkabarabas.hu

Kerkabarabás (Slovene: Barabaš) is a village in Zala County, Hungary.
