= Ortaháza =

- Village
- Flag Coat of arms

- Location of Ortaháza
- Coordinates: 46.62255°N 16.6819°E
- Country: Hungary
- Region: Western Transdanubia
- County: Zala
- District: Lenti

Area
  - Total: 7.03 km^{2} (2.71 sq mi)

Population (1 January 2025)
  - Total: 74
  - Density: 11/km^{2} (27/sq mi)
- Time zone: UTC+1 (CET)
  - Summer (DST): UTC+2 (CEST)
- Postal code: 8954
- Area code: (+36) 92
- Website: ortahaza.hu

Ortaháza is a village in Zala County, Hungary.
