= Nemesnép =

- Village
- Flag Coat of arms

- Location of Nemesnép
- Coordinates: 46.6996°N 16.4542°E
- Country: Hungary
- Region: Western Transdanubia
- County: Zala
- District: Lenti

Area
  - Total: 9.72 km^{2} (3.75 sq mi)

Population (1 January 2025)
  - Total: 111
  - Density: 11.4/km^{2} (29.6/sq mi)
- Time zone: UTC+1 (CET)
  - Summer (DST): UTC+2 (CEST)
- Postal code: 8976
- Area code: (+36) 92
- Website: www.nemesnep.hu

Nemesnép is a village in Zala County, Hungary.
