= Zalaszombatfa =

Zalaszombatfa Soboška ves (in Slovene)
- Village
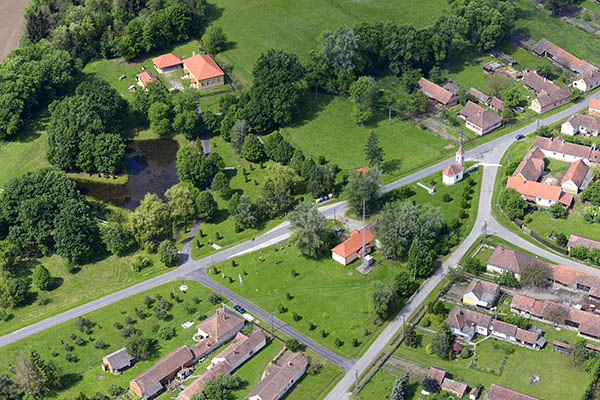

- Flag Coat of arms

- Location of Zalaszombatfa
- Coordinates: 46.63903°N 16.44441°E
- Country: Hungary
- Region: Western Transdanubia
- County: Zala
- District: Lenti

Area
  - Total: 5.89 km^{2} (2.27 sq mi)

Population (1 January 2026)
  - Total: 31
  - Density: 5.3/km^{2} (14/sq mi)
- Time zone: UTC+1 (CET)
  - Summer (DST): UTC+2 (CEST)
- Postal code: 8969
- Area code: (+36) 92
- Website: zalaszombatfa.hu

Zalaszombatfa is a village in Zala County, Hungary.
