= Kissziget =

- Village
- Flag Coat of arms

- Location of Kissziget
- Coordinates: 46.62157°N 16.66528°E
- Country: Hungary
- Region: Western Transdanubia
- County: Zala
- District: Lenti

Area
  - Total: 7.07 km^{2} (2.73 sq mi)

Population (1 January 2026)
  - Total: 152
  - Density: 21.5/km^{2} (55.7/sq mi)
- Time zone: UTC+1 (CET)
  - Summer (DST): UTC+2 (CEST)
- Postal code: 8954
- Area code: (+36) 92

Kissziget is a village in Zala County, Hungary.
