= Hernyék =

- Village
- Flag Coat of arms

- Location of Hernyék
- Coordinates: 46.65018°N 16.6413°E
- Country: Hungary
- Region: Western Transdanubia
- County: Zala
- District: Lenti

Area
  - Total: 10.31 km^{2} (3.98 sq mi)

Population (1 January 2025)
  - Total: 86
  - Density: 8.3/km^{2} (22/sq mi)
- Time zone: UTC+1 (CET)
  - Summer (DST): UTC+2 (CEST)
- Postal code: 8957
- Area code: (+36) 92
- Website: hernyek.hu

Hernyék is a village in Zala County, Hungary.
