= Pusztaapáti =

- Village
- Flag Coat of arms

- Location of Pusztaapáti
- Coordinates: 46°45′53″N 16°36′33″E
- Country: Hungary
- Region: Western Transdanubia
- County: Zala
- District: Lenti

Area
  - Total: 10.59 km^{2} (4.09 sq mi)

Population (1 January 2025)
  - Total: 21
  - Density: 2.0/km^{2} (5.1/sq mi)
- Time zone: UTC+1 (CET)
  - Summer (DST): UTC+2 (CEST)
- Postal code: 8986
- Area code: (+36) 92
- Website: pusztaapati.hu

Pusztaapáti is a village in Zala County, Hungary.
