= Kányavár =

Coordinates: 46°34′N 16°41′E

- Village
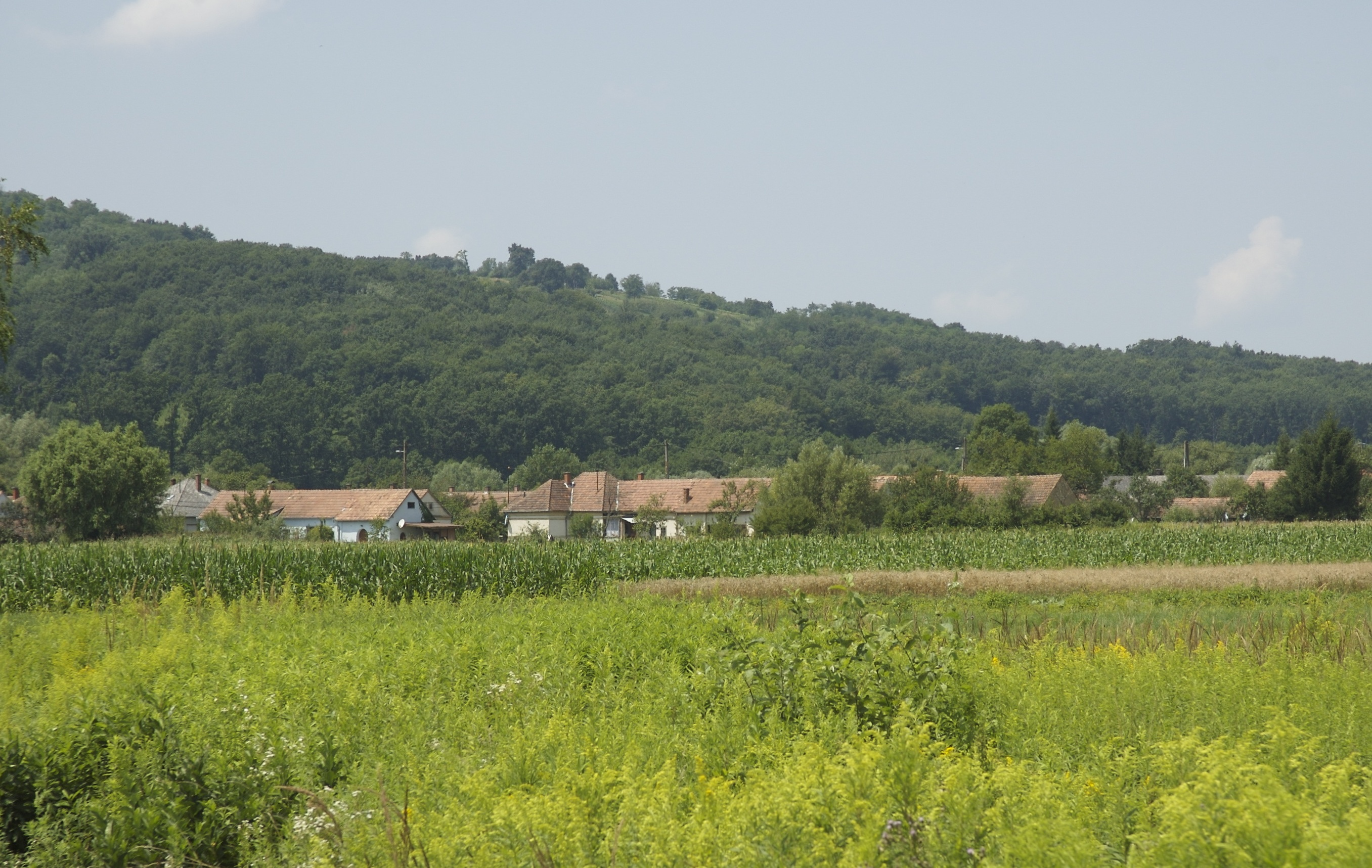
- Kányavár 2010
- Interactive map of Kányavár
- Country: Hungary
- Region: Western Transdanubia
- County: Zala County

Population (2011)
  - Total: 121
- Time zone: UTC+1 (CET)
  - Summer (DST): UTC+2 (CEST)

Kányavár is a village in Zala County, Hungary.

== Population history ==
The population of the village has fell considerably since 1870.
