= Resznek =

Resznek Režek (in Slovene)
- Village
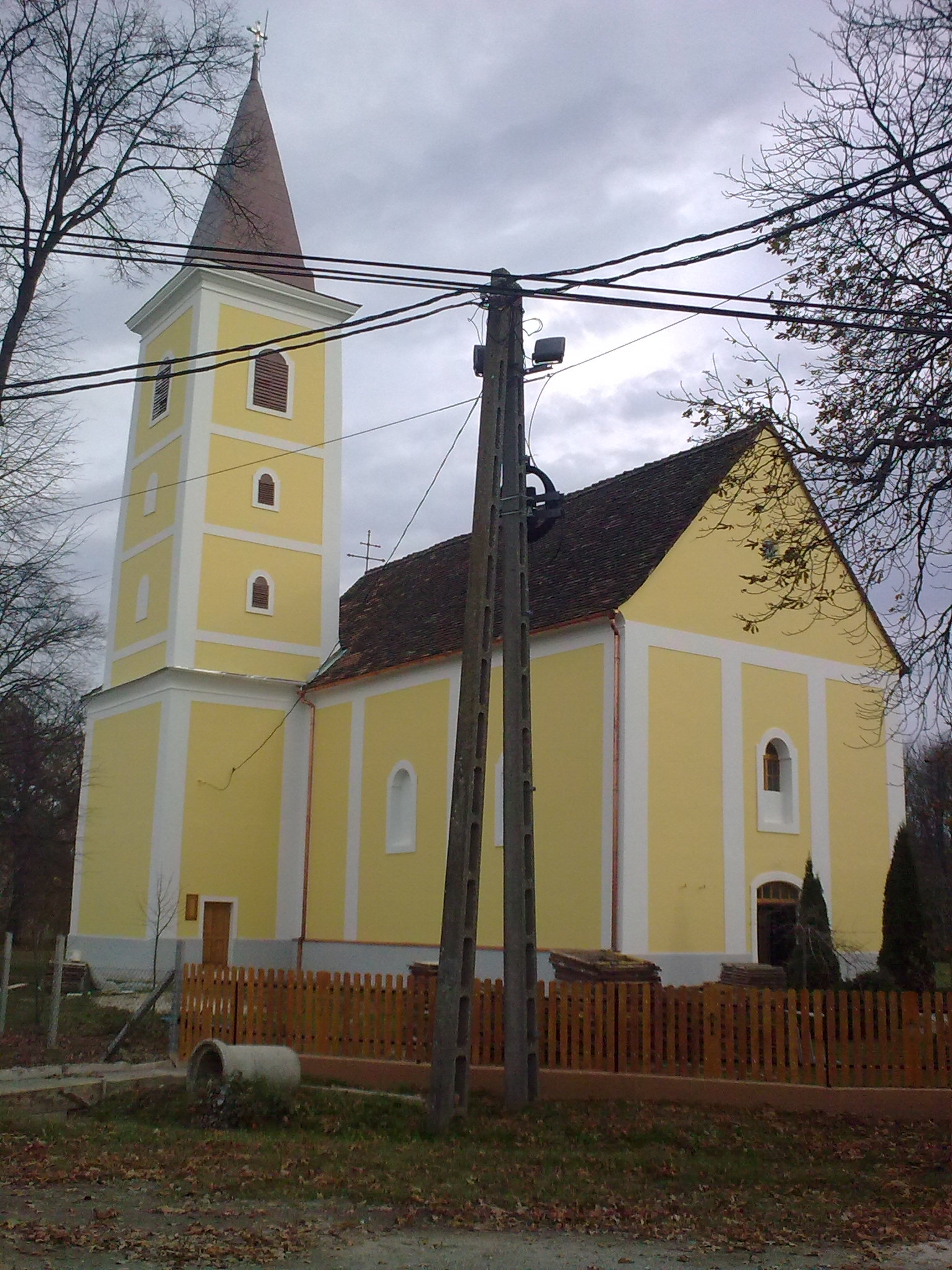

- Flag Coat of arms

- Location of Resznek
- Coordinates: 46.66391°N 16.47328°E
- Country: Hungary
- Region: Western Transdanubia
- County: Zala
- District: Lenti

Area
  - Total: 18.42 km^{2} (7.11 sq mi)

Population (1 January 2025)
  - Total: 233
  - Density: 12.6/km^{2} (32.8/sq mi)
- Time zone: UTC+1 (CET)
  - Summer (DST): UTC+2 (CEST)
- Postal code: 8977
- Area code: (+36) 92
- Website: resznek.hu

Resznek ( Slovene:Režek ) is a village in Zala County, Hungary.
