= Kerkafalva =

Village in Zala County, Hungary

- Village
- Flag Coat of arms

- Location of Kerkafalva
- Coordinates: 46.77027°N 16.48642°E
- Country: Hungary
- Region: Western Transdanubia
- County: Zala
- District: Lenti

Area
  - Total: 18.5 km^{2} (7.1 sq mi)

Population (1 January 2026)
  - Total: 121
  - Density: 6.54/km^{2} (16.9/sq mi)
- Time zone: UTC+1 (CET)
  - Summer (DST): UTC+2 (CEST)
- Postal code: 8973
- Area code: (+36) 92

Kerkafalva is a village in Zala County, Hungary.
