= Lakhegy =

- Village
- Flag Coat of arms

- Location of Lakhegy
- Coordinates: 46.94941°N 16.83565°E
- Country: Hungary
- Region: Western Transdanubia
- County: Zala
- District: Zalaegerszeg

Area
  - Total: 8.58 km^{2} (3.31 sq mi)

Population (1 January 2026)
  - Total: 419
  - Density: 48.8/km^{2} (126/sq mi)
- Time zone: UTC+1 (CET)
  - Summer (DST): UTC+2 (CEST)
- Postal code: 8913
- Area code: (+36) 92
- Website: lakhegy.hu

Lakhegy is a village in Zala County, Hungary.
