= Kozmadombja =

- Village
- Flag Coat of arms

- Location of Kozmadombja
- Coordinates: 46.76767°N 16.55305°E
- Country: Hungary
- Region: Western Transdanubia
- County: Zala
- District: Lenti

Area
  - Total: 7.63 km^{2} (2.95 sq mi)

Population (1 January 2026)
  - Total: 35
  - Density: 4.6/km^{2} (12/sq mi)
- Time zone: UTC+1 (CET)
  - Summer (DST): UTC+2 (CEST)
- Postal code: 8988
- Area code: (+36) 92
- Website: kozmadombja.hu

Kozmadombja is a village in Zala County, Hungary.
