= Szilvágy =

- Village
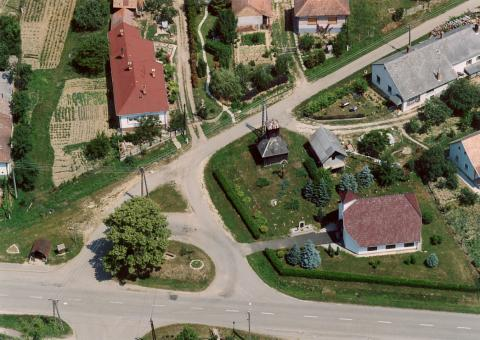

- Flag Coat of arms

- Location of Szilvágy
- Coordinates: 46.734489°N 16.623039°E
- Country: Hungary
- Region: Western Transdanubia
- County: Zala
- District: Lenti

Area
  - Total: 24.27 km^{2} (9.37 sq mi)

Population (1 January 2026)
  - Total: 187
  - Density: 7.70/km^{2} (20.0/sq mi)
- Time zone: UTC+1 (CET)
  - Summer (DST): UTC+2 (CEST)
- Postal code: 8986
- Area code: (+36) 92
- Website: szilvagy.hu

Szilvágy is a village in Zala County, Hungary.
