= Barlahida =

- Village
- Flag Coat of arms

- Location of Barlahida
- Coordinates: 46.7167°N 16.6998°E
- Country: Hungary
- Region: Western Transdanubia
- County: Zala
- District: Lenti

Area
  - Total: 6.1 km^{2} (2.4 sq mi)

Population (1 January 2025)
  - Total: 119
  - Density: 20/km^{2} (51/sq mi)
- Time zone: UTC+1 (CET)
  - Summer (DST): UTC+2 (CEST)
- Postal code: 8948
- Area code: (+36) 92
- Website: barlahida.hu

Barlahida is a village in Zala County, Hungary.
