= Zalabaksa =

- Village
- Flag Coat of arms

- Location of Zalabaksa
- Coordinates: 46.70617°N 16.55118°E
- Country: Hungary
- Region: Western Transdanubia
- County: Zala
- District: Lenti

Area
  - Total: 16.1 km^{2} (6.2 sq mi)

Population (1 January 2026)
  - Total: 571
  - Density: 35.5/km^{2} (91.9/sq mi)
- Time zone: UTC+1 (CET)
  - Summer (DST): UTC+2 (CEST)
- Postal code: 8971
- Area code: (+36) 92
- Website: zalabaksa.hu

Zalabaksa is a village in Zala County, Hungary.
