= Pórszombat =

- Village
- Flag Coat of arms

- Location of Pórszombat
- Coordinates: 46.72878°N 16.57255°E
- Country: Hungary
- Region: Western Transdanubia
- County: Zala
- District: Lenti

Area
  - Total: 15.52 km^{2} (5.99 sq mi)

Population (1 January 2025)
  - Total: 238
  - Density: 15.3/km^{2} (39.7/sq mi)
- Time zone: UTC+1 (CET)
  - Summer (DST): UTC+2 (CEST)
- Postal code: 8986
- Area code: (+36) 92
- Website: porszombat.hu

Pórszombat is a village in Zala County, Hungary.
