= Zala County =

County of Hungary

Coordinates: 46°40′N 16°50′E

Zala County Zala megye
- County
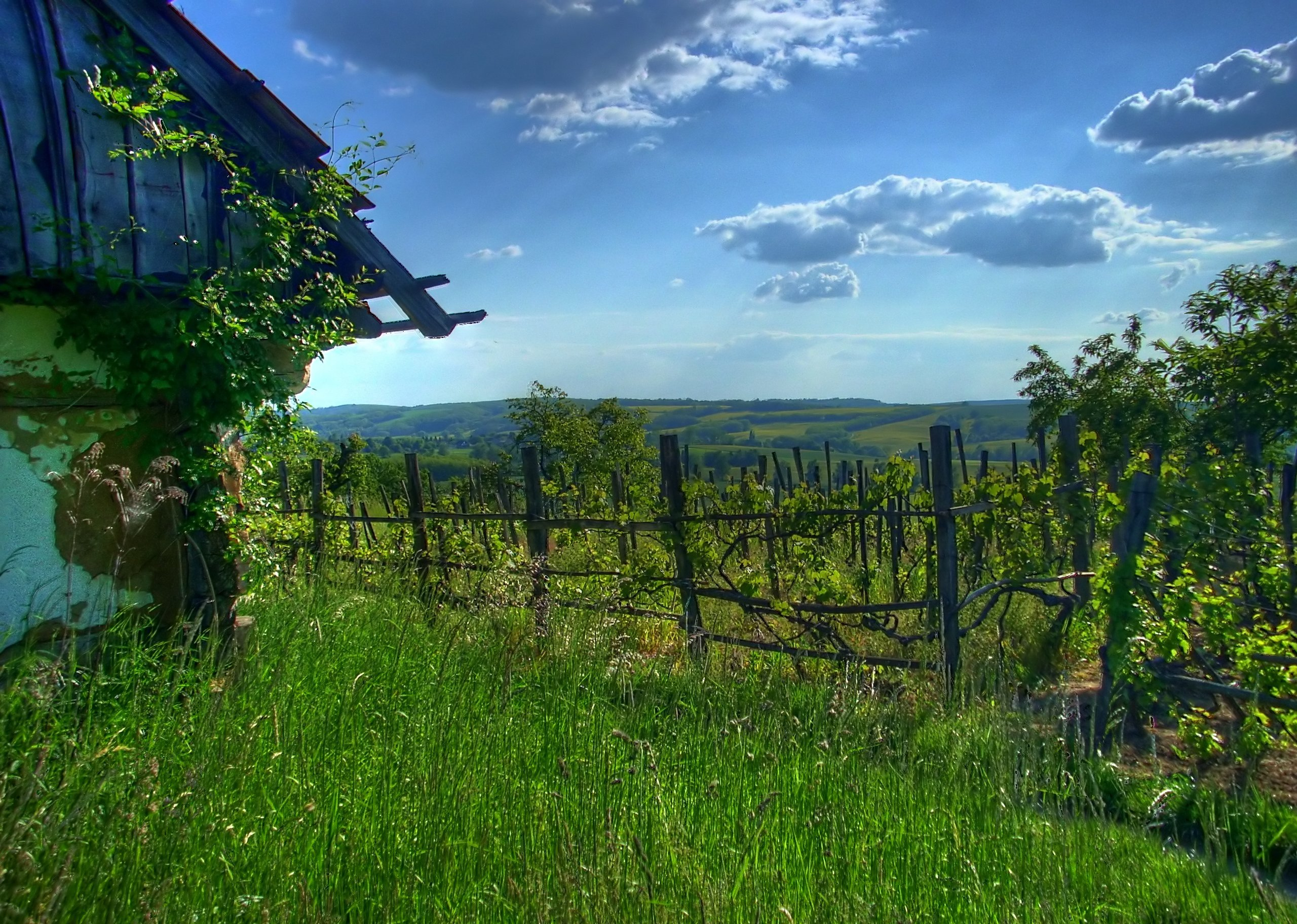
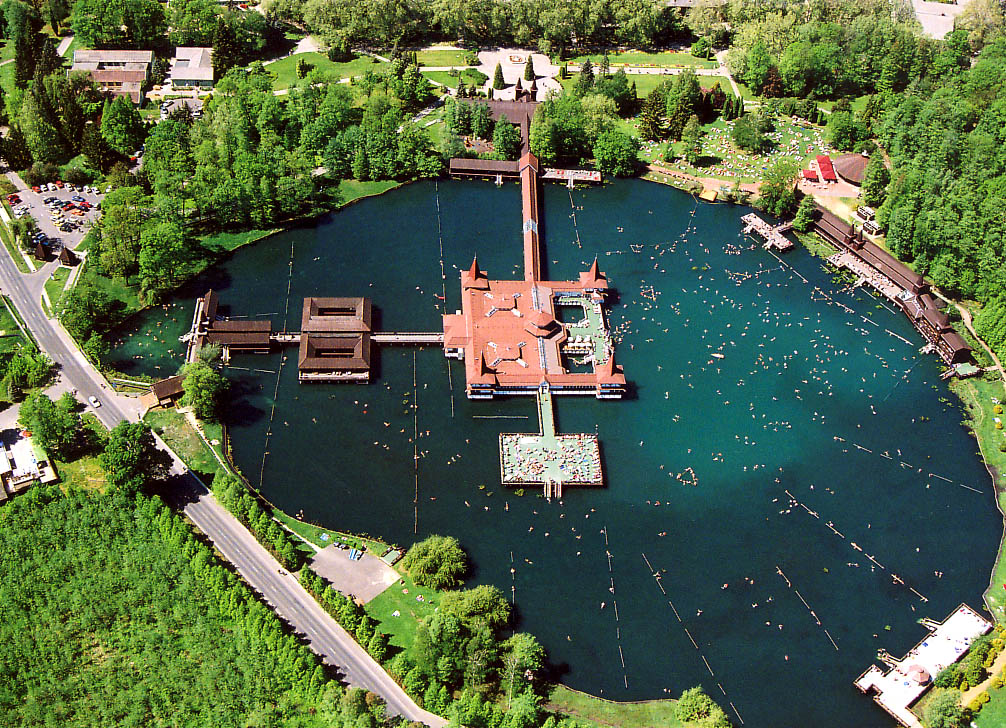
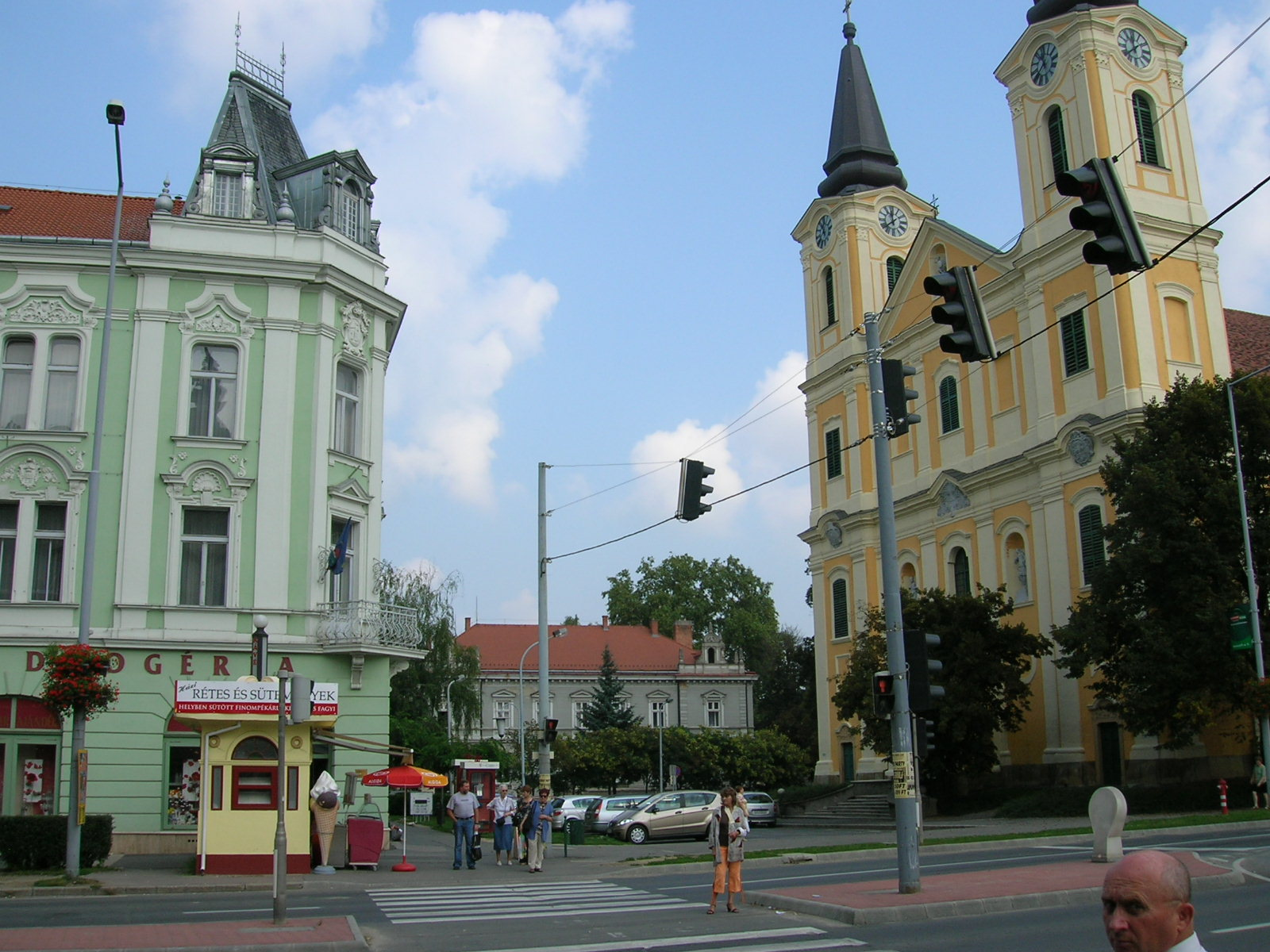
- Descending, from top: Hills near Söjtör, Lake Hévíz, and Downtown of Zalaegerszeg

- Flag Coat of arms

- Zala County within Hungary
- Country: Hungary
- Region: Western Transdanubia
- County seat: Zalaegerszeg
- Districts: 6 districts: Keszthely District; Lenti District; Letenye District; Nagykanizsa District; Zalaegerszeg District; Zalaszentgrót District

Government
  - President of the General Assembly: Dr. Attila Pál (Fidesz-KDNP)

Area
  - Total: 3,783.89 km^{2} (1,460.97 sq mi)
  - Rank: 14th in Hungary

Population (2018)
  - Total: 270,634
  - Rank: 16th in Hungary
  - Density: 71.5227/km^{2} (185.243/sq mi)

GDP
  - Total: HUF 747 billion €2.398 billion (2016)
- Postal code: 8353 – 839x, 874x – 879x, 880x – 883x, 8855, 8856, 886x – 889x, 89xx
- Area code(s): (+36) 83, 92, 93
- ISO 3166 code: HU-ZA
- Website: www.zala.hu

Zala (Hungarian: Zala megye, pronounced [ˈzɒlɒ]; Croatian: Zalska županija; županija Zala) is an administrative county (comitatus or megye) in south-western Hungary. It is named after the Zala River. It shares borders with Croatia (Koprivnica–Križevci and Međimurje Counties) and Slovenia (Lendava and Moravske Toplice) and the Hungarian counties Vas, Veszprém and Somogy. The seat of Zala County is Zalaegerszeg. Its area is 3,784 square kilometres (1,461 sq mi). Lake Balaton lies partly in the county.

== History ==
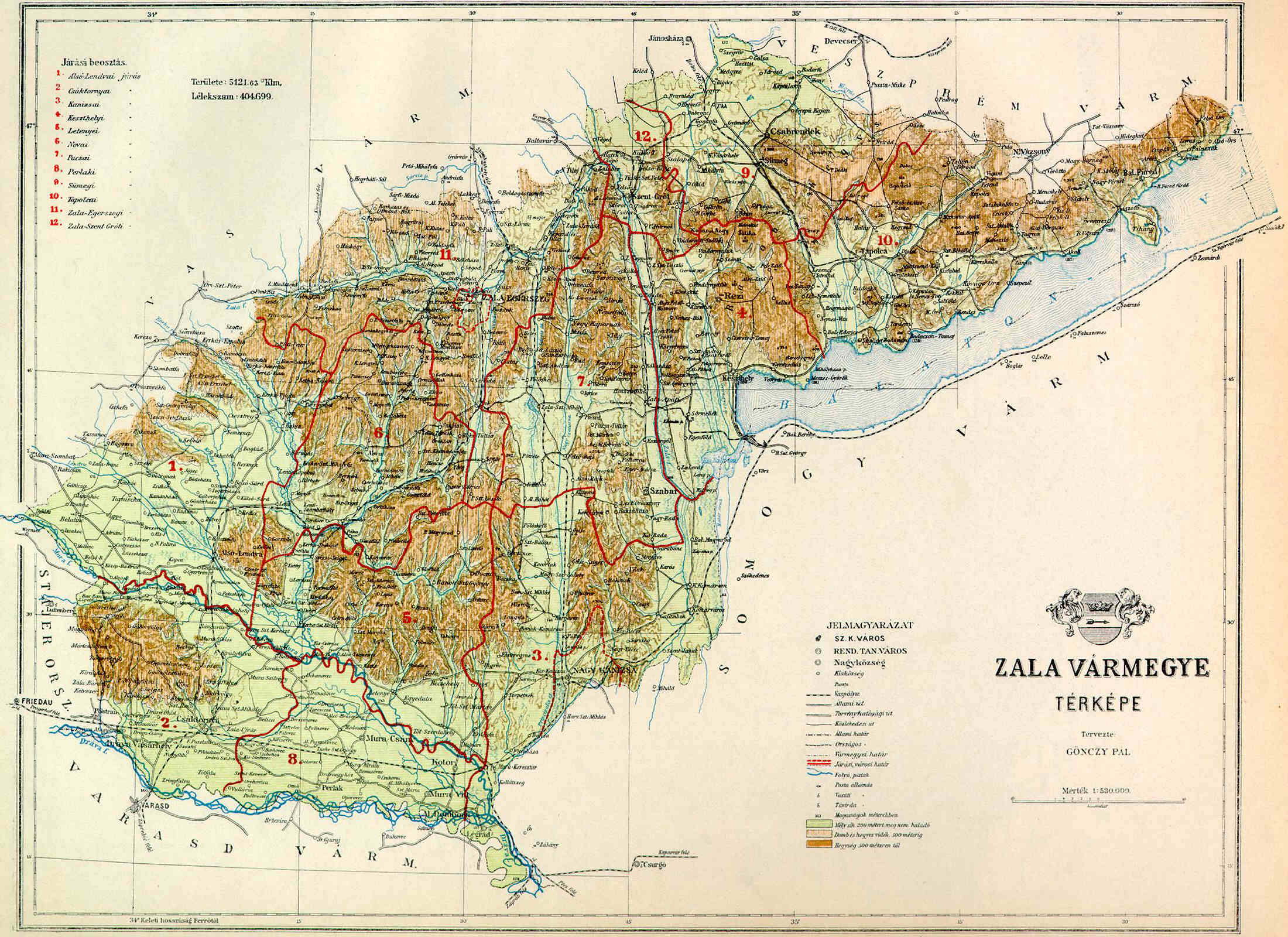
Zala County on an old map

In the tenth century, the Hungarian Nyék tribe occupied the region around Lake Balaton. Their occupation was mainly in the areas known today as Zala and Somogy counties.

Parts of the western territory of the former county of Zala are now part of Slovenia (South-Prekmurje) and Croatia (Međimurje). In 1919 it was part of the unrecognized state of the Republic of Prekmurje, which existed for just six days.

== Demographics ==
Religion in Zala County (2022 census – of those who declared their religion (62.5%))
1. Roman Catholic (75.8%)
2. Calvinistic (3.90%)
3. Lutheran (2.10%)
4. Other Christian denomination (4.40%)
5. Other religion (0.30%)
6. Not religious (13.5%)

In 2015, it had a population of 277,290 and the population density was 73 inhabitants per square kilometre (190/sq mi).

| Year | County population | Change |
|---|---|---|
| 1949 | 305,433 | n/a |
| 1960 | ▲317,145 | 3.83% |
| 1970 | ▼304,127 | -4.10% |
| 1980 | ▲317,298 (record) | 4.33% |
| 1990 | ▼306,398 | -3.44% |
| 2001 | ▼297,404 | -2.94% |
| 2011 | ▼282,179 | -5.12% |
| 2015 | ▼277,290 | -1.76% |
| 2018 | ▼270,634 | -2.45% |

=== Ethnicity ===
Besides the Hungarian majority, the main minorities are the Roma (approx. 7,000), Croats (3,500) and Germans (2,000).

Total population (2011 census): 282,179
Ethnic groups (2011 census): Identified themselves: 255 069 persons:

- Hungarians: 241 408 (94,64%)
- Romani: 6 981 (2,74%)
- Croats: 3 248 (1,27%)
- Others and indefinable: 3 432 (1,35%)

Approx. 38,000 persons in Zala County did not declare their ethnic group at the 2011 census.

=== Religion ===
Religious adherence in the county according to 2011 census:

- Catholic – 177,072 (Roman Catholic – 176,721; Greek Catholic – 313);
- Reformed – 7,000;
- Evangelical – 3,928;
- other religions – 2,463;
- Non-religious – 23,119;
- Atheism – 2,272;
- Undeclared – 66,325.

== Regional structure ==
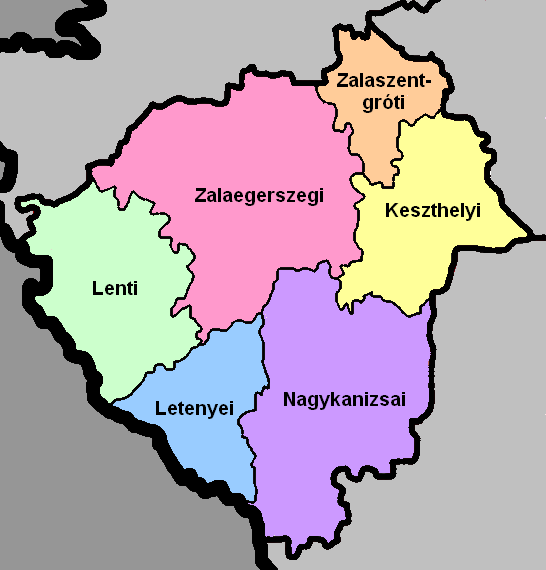
District of Zala County

| No. | English and Hungarian names | Area (km^{2}) | Population (2011) | Density (pop./km^{2}) | Seat | No. of municipalities |
|---|---|---|---|---|---|---|
| 1 | Keszthely District; Keszthelyi járás | 535.93 | 49,421 | 92 | Keszthely | 30 |
| 2 | Lenti District; Lenti járás | 624.12 | 19,789 | 32 | Lenti | 48 |
| 3 | Letenye District; Letenyei járás | 388.69 | 16,410 | 42 | Letenye | 27 |
| 4 | Nagykanizsa District; Nagykanizsai járás | 907.91 | 78,252 | 86 | Nagykanizsa | 49 |
| 5 | Zalaegerszeg District; Zalaegerszegi járás | 1,044.70 | 102,798 | 98 | Zalaegerszeg | 84 |
| 6 | Zalaszentgrót District; Zalaszentgróti járás | 282.56 | 15,509 | 55 | Zalaszentgrót | 20 |
| Zala County | | 3,784.11 | 287,043 | 77 | Zalaegerszeg | 258 |

== Politics ==
The Zala County Council, elected at the 2014 local government elections, is made up of 15 counselors, with the following party composition:

| Party | Seats | Current County Assembly |
|---|---|---|
| Fidesz-KDNP | 9 | |
| Movement for a Better Hungary (Jobbik) | 4 | |
| Democratic Coalition (DK) | 1 | |
| Hungarian Socialist Party (MSZP) | 1 | |

=== Presidents of the General Assembly ===
List of presidents since 1990
| Attila Pál (Fidesz-KDNP) | 2014– |

== Municipalities ==
Zala County has two urban counties, eight towns, two large villages and 246 villages.

City with county rights

(ordered by population, as of 2011 census)

- Zalaegerszeg (59,499)
- Nagykanizsa (49,026)

Towns

- Keszthely (20,619)
- Lenti (7,940)
- Zalaszentgrót (6,626)
- Hévíz (4,715)
- Letenye (4,192)
- Zalalövő (3,006)
- Zalakaros (1,756)
- Pacsa (1,711)

Villages

- Alibánfa
- Almásháza
- Alsónemesapáti
- Alsópáhok
- Alsórajk
- Alsószenterzsébet
- Babosdöbréte
- Baglad
- Bagod
- Bak
- Baktüttös
- Balatongyörök
- Balatonmagyaród
- Bánokszentgyörgy
- Barlahida
- Batyk
- Bázakerettye
- Becsehely
- Becsvölgye
- Belezna
- Belsősárd
- Bezeréd
- Bocfölde
- Bocska
- Boncodfölde
- Borsfa
- Bókaháza
- Böde
- Bödeháza
- Börzönce
- Búcsúszentlászló
- Bucsuta
- Csapi
- Csatár
- Cserszegtomaj
- Csertalakos
- Csesztreg
- Csonkahegyhát
- Csöde
- Csömödér
- Csörnyeföld
- Dióskál
- Dobri
- Dobronhegy
- Döbröce
- Dötk
- Egeraracsa
- Egervár
- Eszteregnye
- Esztergályhorváti
- Felsőpáhok
- Felsőrajk
- Felsőszenterzsébet
- Fityeház
- Fűzvölgy
- Galambok
- Garabonc
- Gáborjánháza
- Gellénháza
- Gelse
- Gelsesziget
- Gétye
- Gombosszeg
- Gosztola
- Gősfa
- Gutorfölde
- Gyenesdiás
- Gyűrűs
- Hagyárosbörönd
- Hahót
- Hernyék
- Homokkomárom
- Hosszúvölgy
- Hottó
- Iborfia
- Iklódbördőce
- Kacorlak
- Kallósd
- Karmacs
- Kálócfa
- Kányavár
- Kávás
- Kehidakustány
- Kemendollár
- Keménfa
- Kerecseny
- Kerkabarabás
- Kerkafalva
- Kerkakutas
- Kerkaszentkirály
- Kerkateskánd
- Kilimán
- Kisbucsa
- Kiscsehi
- Kisgörbő
- Kiskutas
- Kispáli
- Kisrécse
- Kissziget
- Kistolmács
- Kisvásárhely
- Kozmadombja
- Kustánszeg
- Külsősárd
- Lakhegy
- Lasztonya
- Lendvadedes
- Lendvajakabfa
- Lickóvadamos
- Ligetfalva
- Lispeszentadorján
- Liszó
- Lovászi
- Magyarföld
- Magyarszentmiklós
- Magyarszerdahely
- Maróc
- Márokföld
- Miháld
- Mihályfa
- Mikekarácsonyfa
- Milejszeg
- Misefa
- Molnári
- Murakeresztúr
- Murarátka
- Muraszemenye
- Nagybakónak
- Nagygörbő
- Nagykapornak
- Nagykutas
- Nagylengyel
- Nagypáli
- Nagyrada
- Nagyrécse
- Nemesapáti
- Nemesbük
- Nemeshetés
- Nemesnép
- Nemespátró
- Nemesrádó
- Nemessándorháza
- Nemesszentandrás
- Németfalu
- Nova
- Oltárc
- Orbányosfa
- Ormándlak
- Orosztony
- Ortaháza
- Ozmánbük
- Óhíd
- Padár
- Pakod
- Pat
- Páka
- Pálfiszeg
- Pethőhenye
- Petrikeresztúr
- Petrivente
- Pókaszepetk
- Pórszombat
- Pölöske
- Pölöskefő
- Pördefölde
- Pötréte
- Pusztaapáti
- Pusztaederics
- Pusztamagyaród
- Pusztaszentlászló
- Ramocsa
- Resznek
- Rezi
- Rédics
- Rigyác
- Salomvár
- Sand
- Sárhida
- Sármellék
- Semjénháza
- Sénye
- Sormás
- Söjtör
- Sümegcsehi
- Surd
- Szalapa
- Szécsisziget
- Szentgyörgyvár
- Szentgyörgyvölgy
- Szentkozmadombja
- Szentliszló
- Szentmargitfalva
- Szentpéterfölde
- Szentpéterúr
- Szepetnek
- Szijártóháza
- Szilvágy
- Teskánd
- Tilaj
- Tófej
- Tormafölde
- Tornyiszentmiklós
- Tótszentmárton
- Tótszerdahely
- Türje
- Újudvar
- Valkonya
- Vasboldogasszony
- Vaspör
- Vállus
- Várfölde
- Várvölgy
- Vindornyafok
- Vindornyalak
- Vindornyaszőlős
- Vonyarcvashegy
- Vöckönd
- Zajk
- Zalaapáti
- Zalabaksa
- Zalabér
- Zalaboldogfa
- Zalacsány
- Zalacséb
- Zalaháshágy
- Zalaigrice
- Zalaistvánd
- Zalakomár
- Zalaköveskút
- Zalamerenye
- Zalasárszeg
- Zalaszabar
- Zalaszántó
- Zalaszentbalázs
- Zalaszentgyörgy
- Zalaszentiván
- Zalaszentjakab
- Zalaszentlászló
- Zalaszentlőrinc
- Zalaszentmárton
- Zalaszentmihály
- Zalaszombatfa
- Zalatárnok
- Zalaújlak
- Zalavár
- Zalavég
- Zebecke

municipalities are large villages.

== Gallery ==
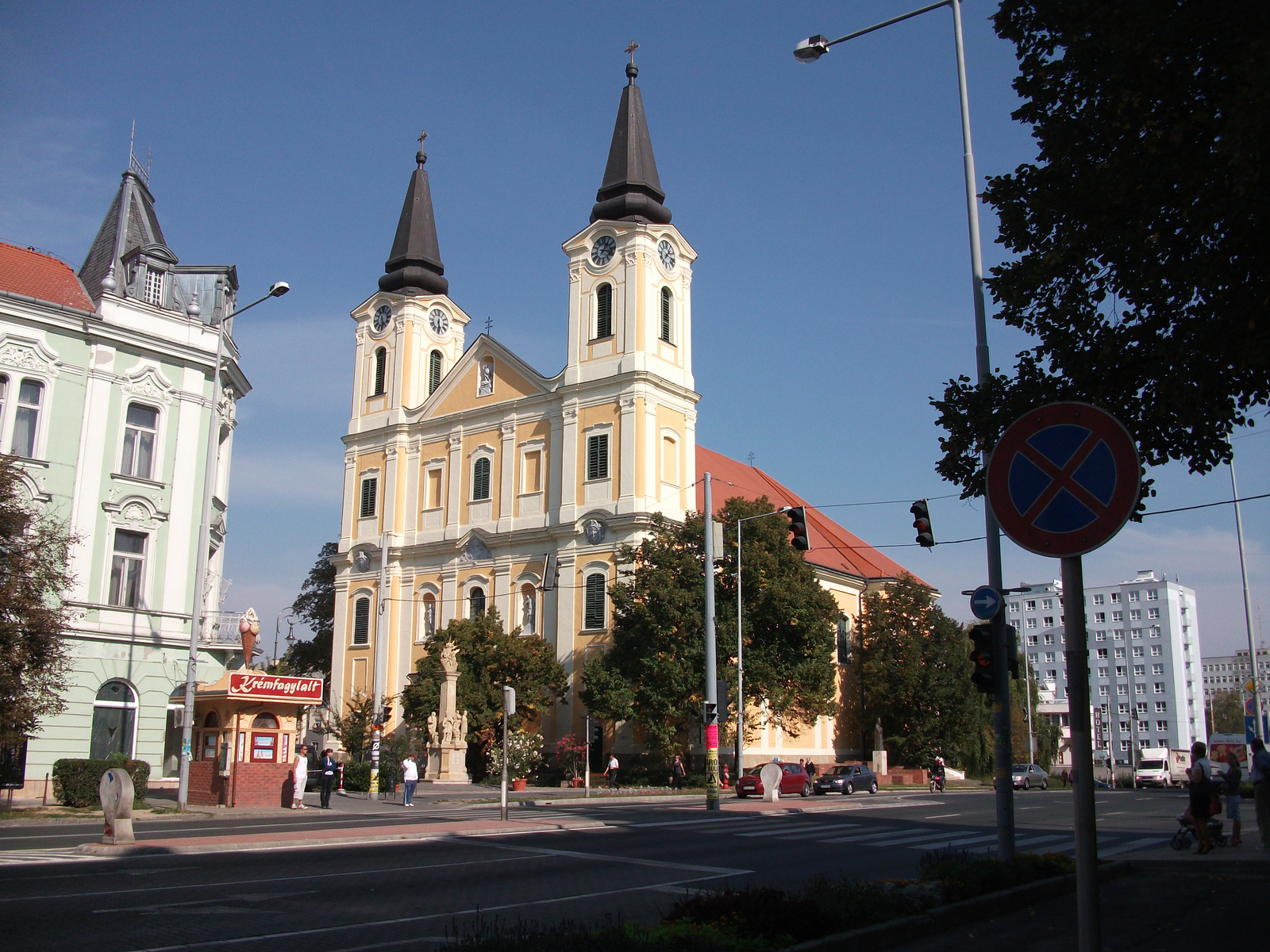
Zalaegerszeg, the capital of the county

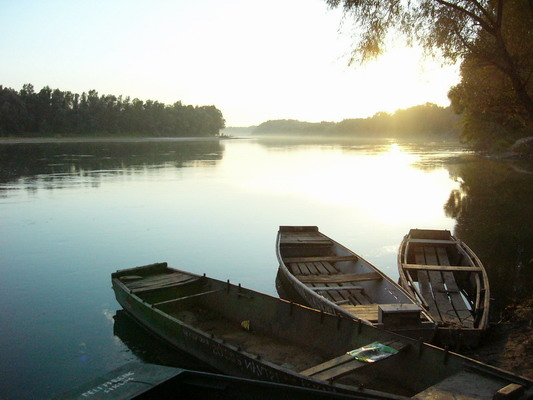
River Drava near Drávaszabolcs

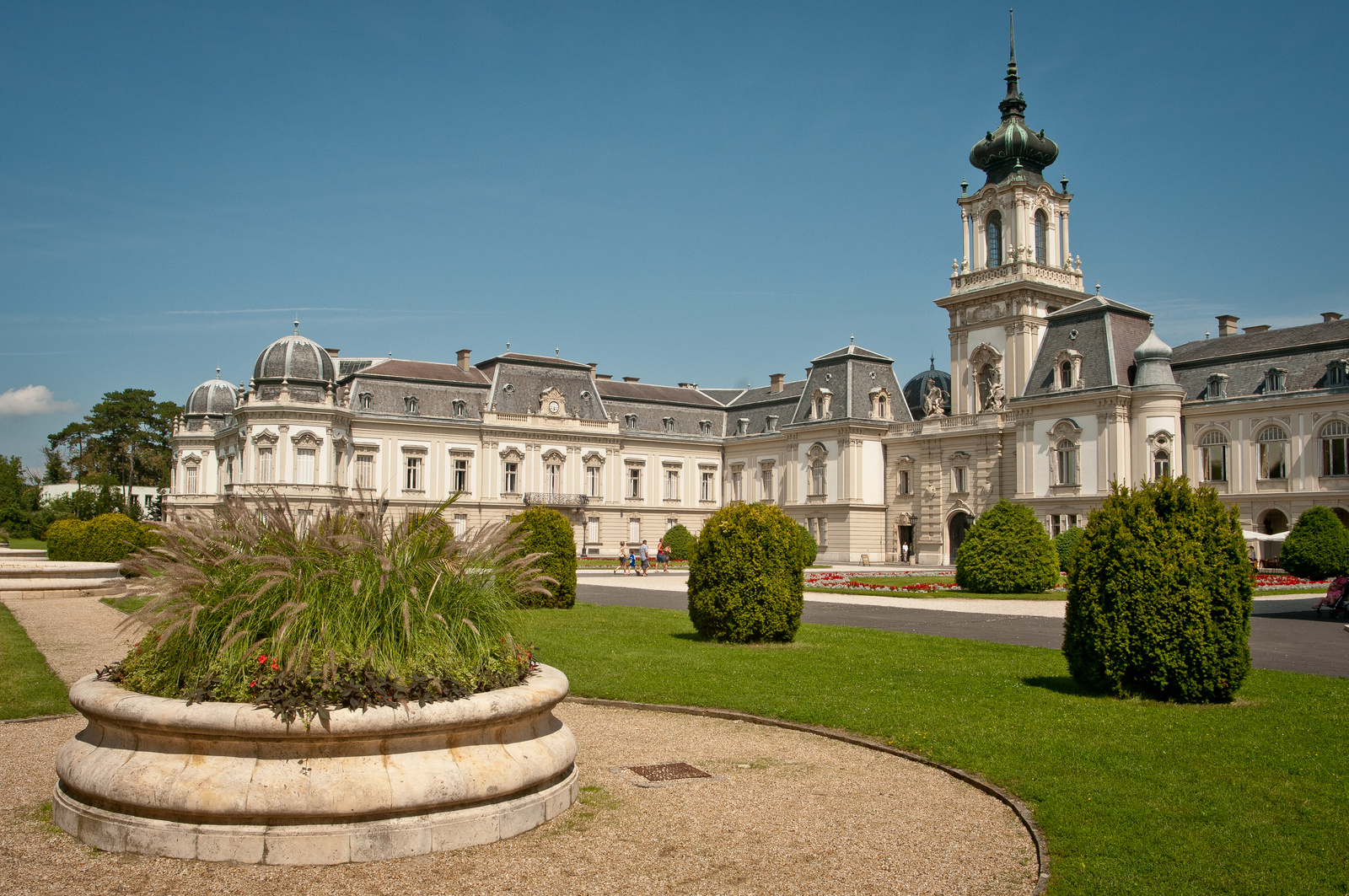
Festetics Palace in Keszthely

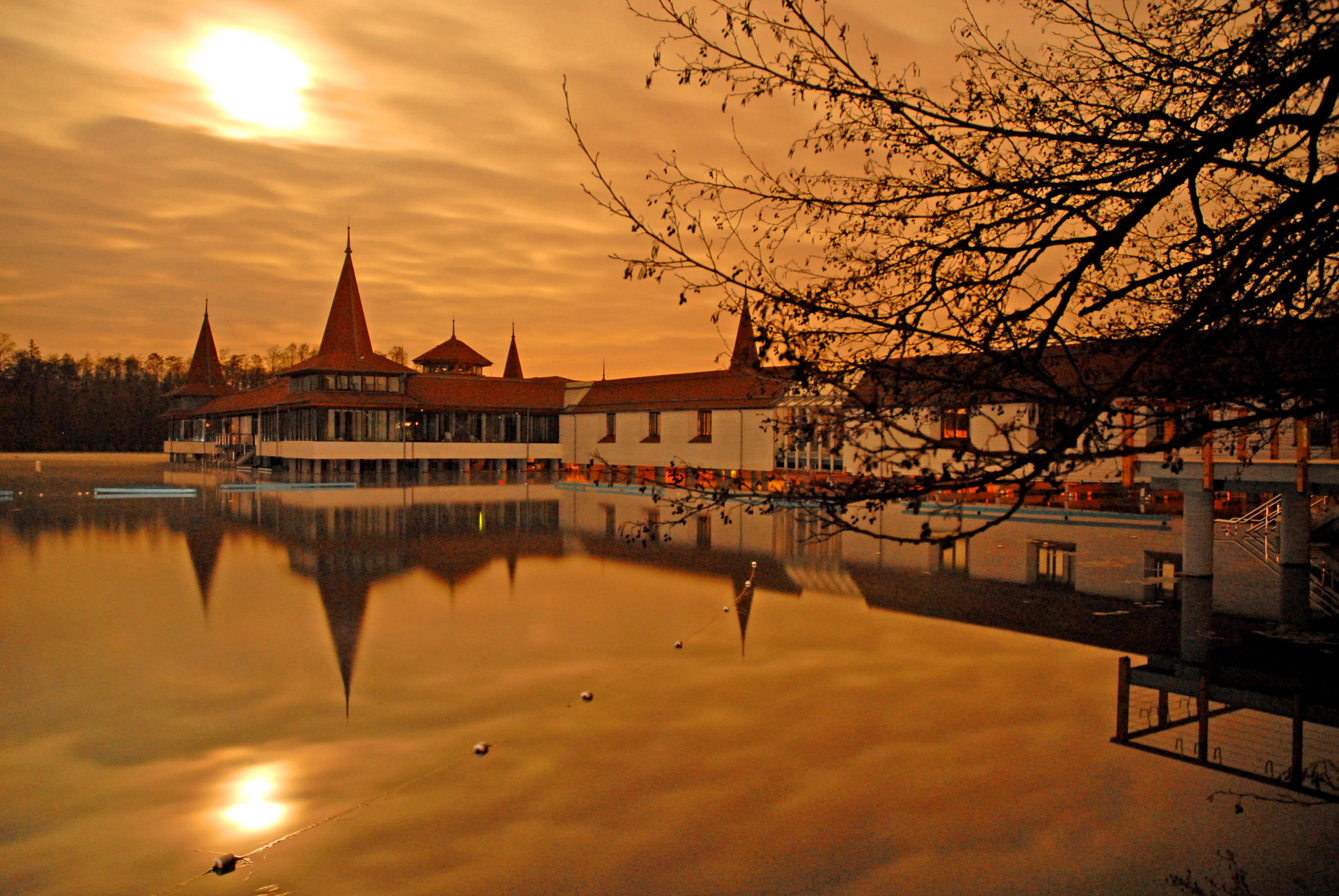
Hévíz, the largest thermal lake in Europe

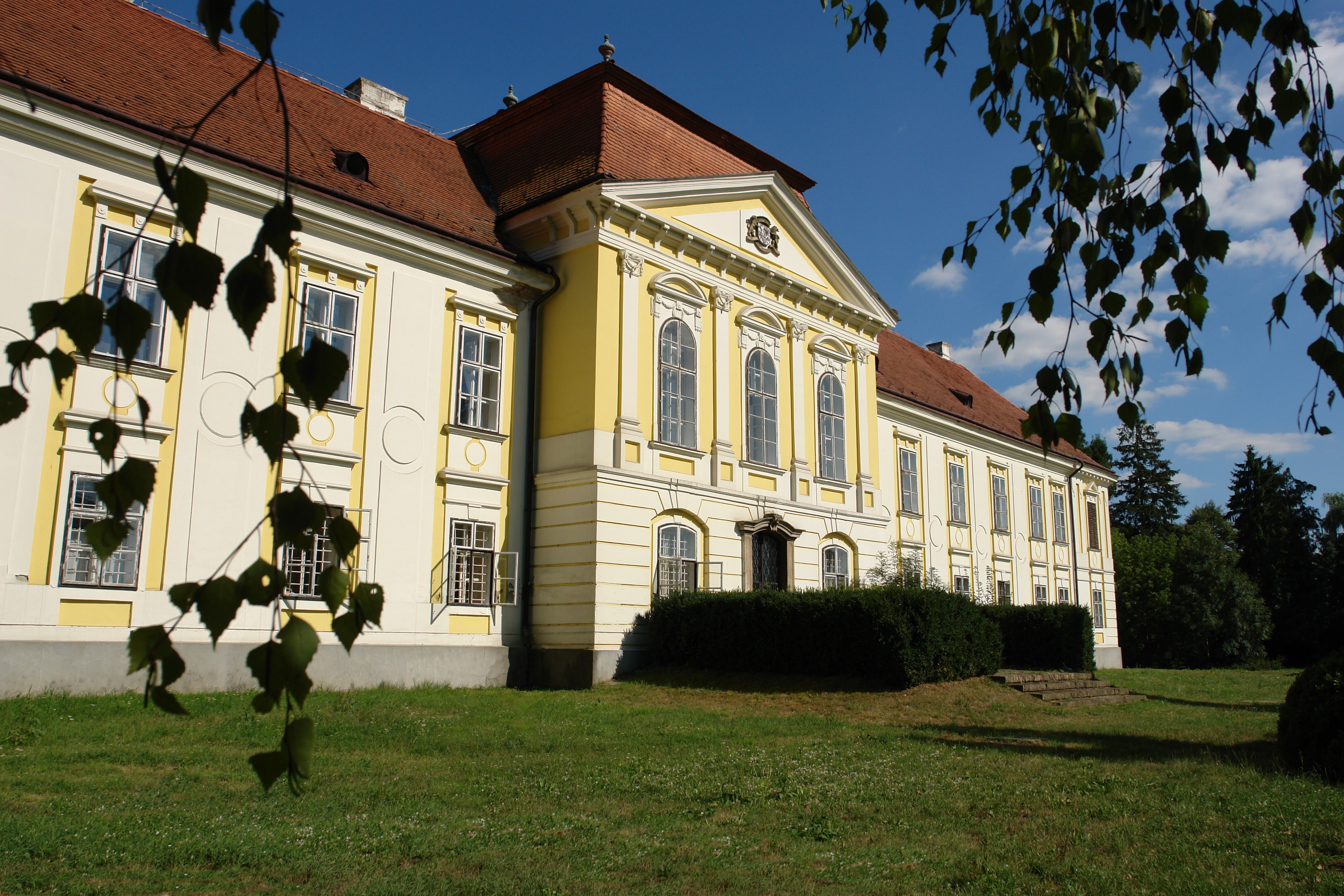
Batthyány Palace in Zalaszentgrót

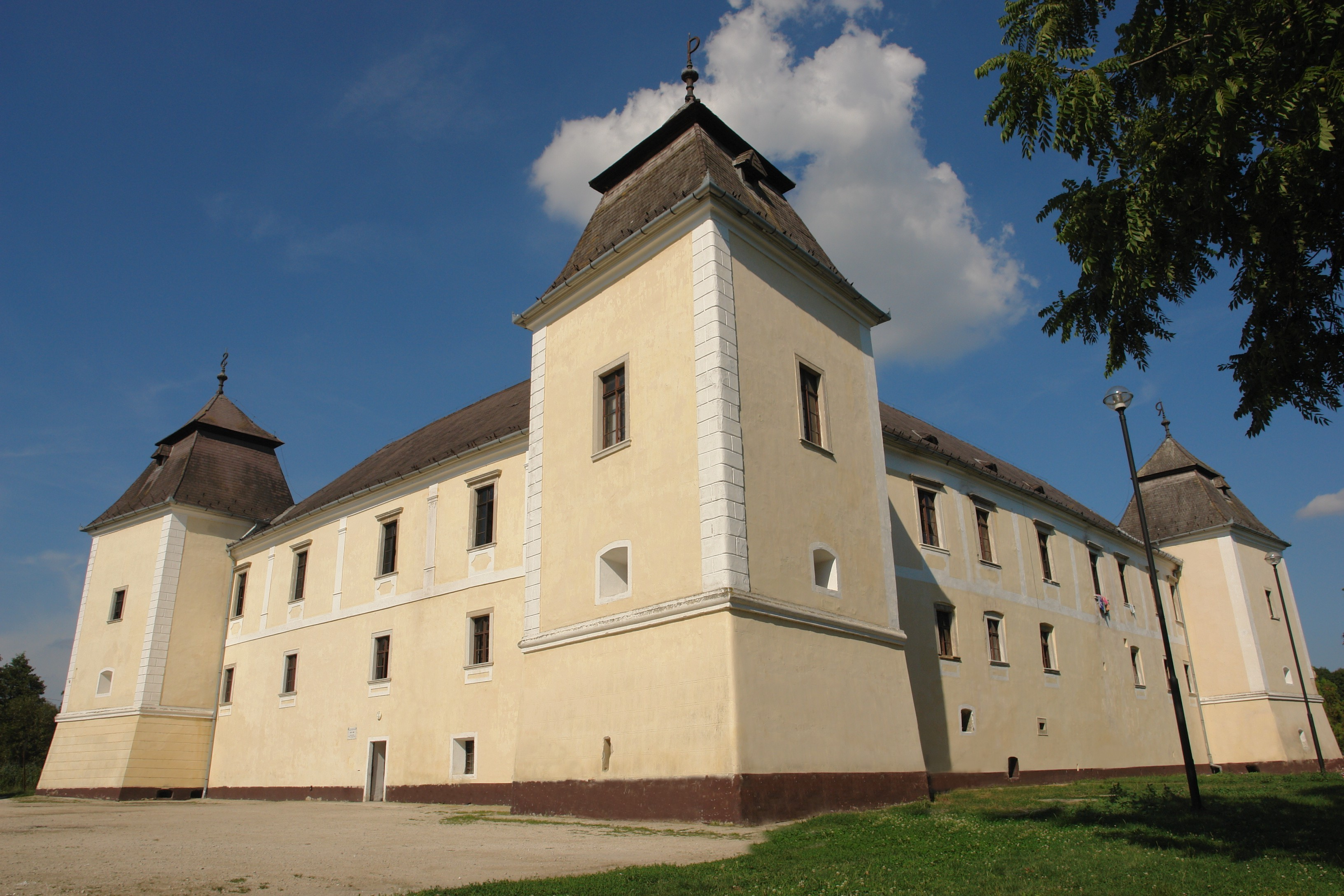
Castle of Egervár

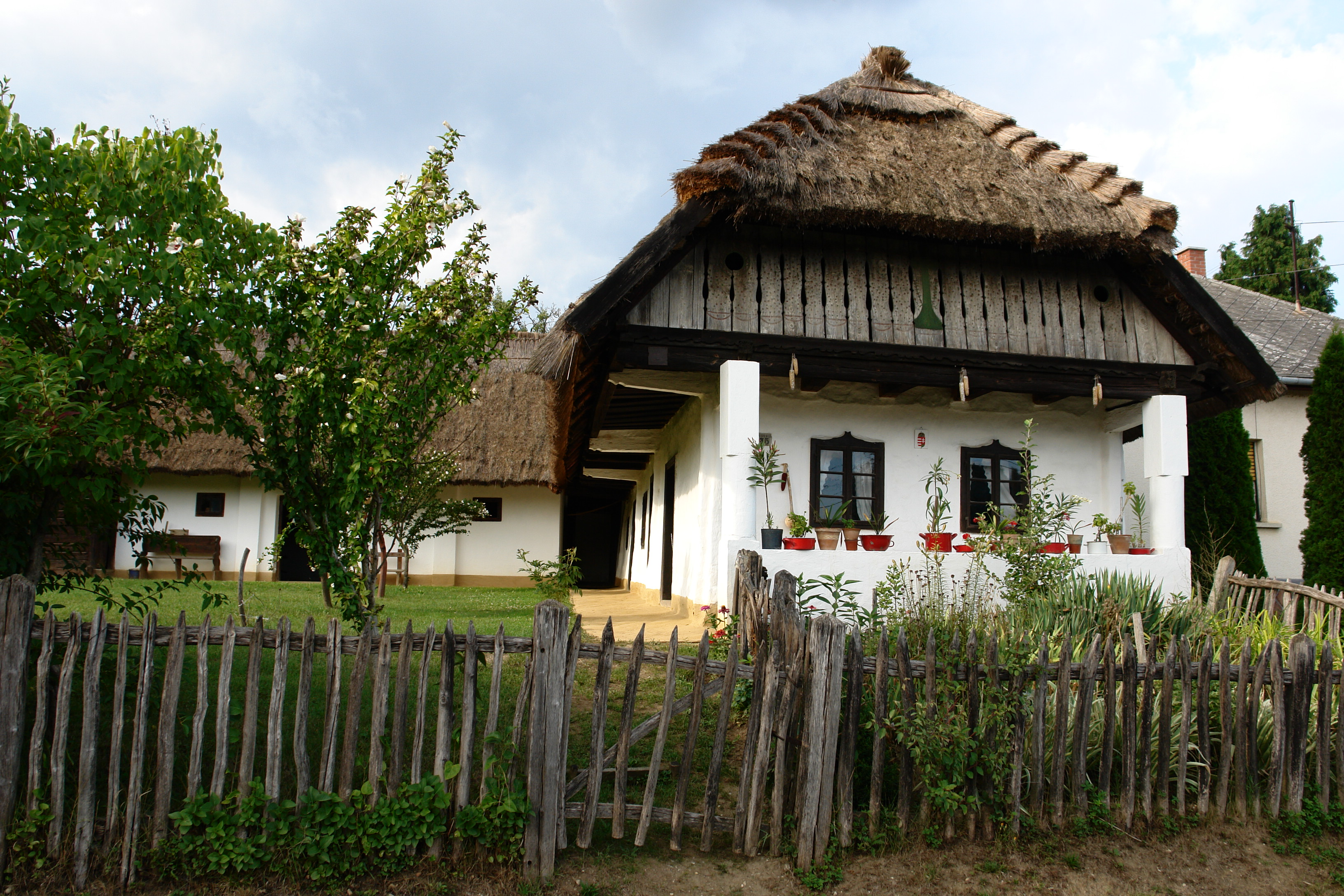
Traditional Hungarian house in Zalalövő

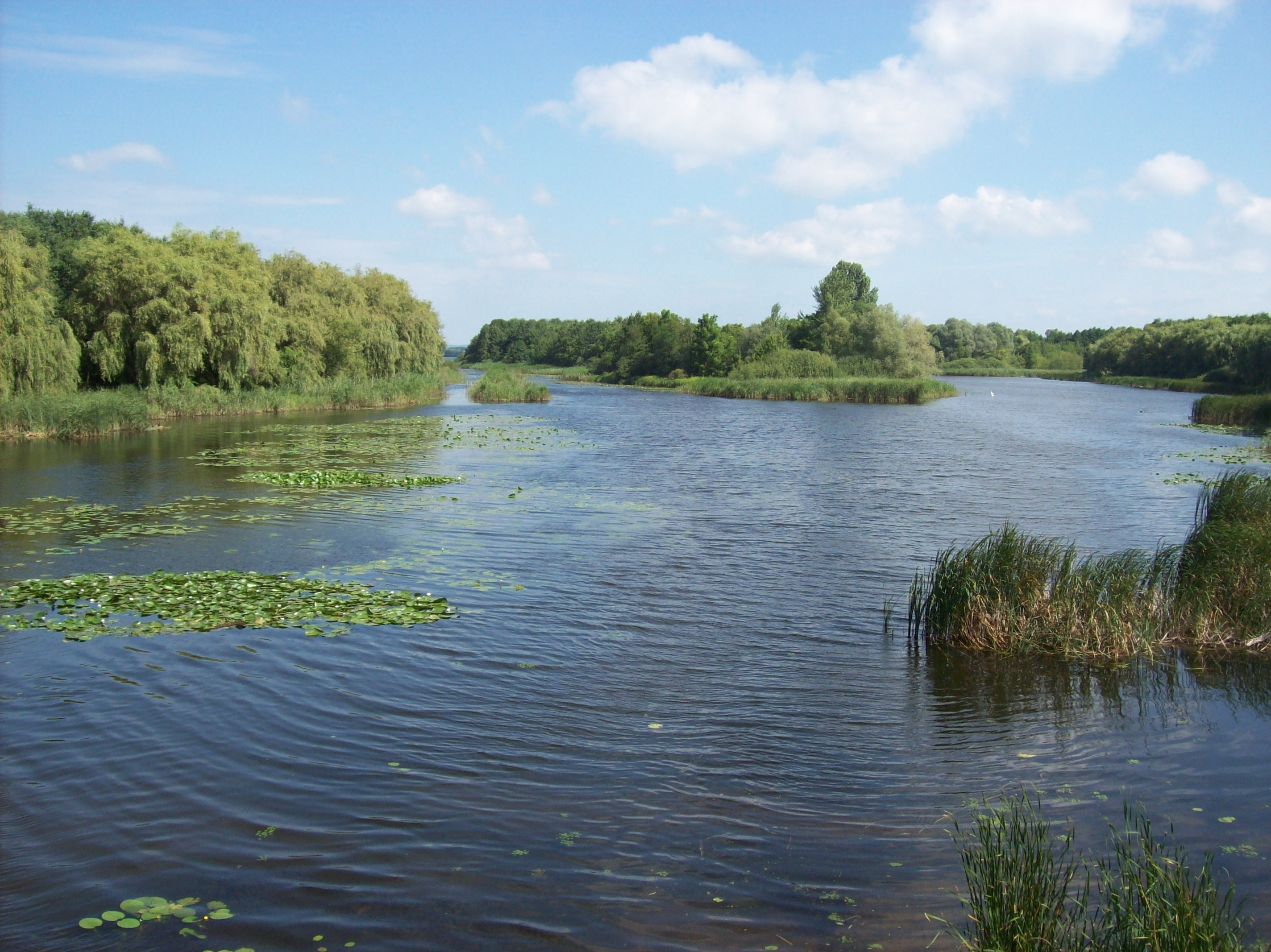
Kis-Balaton
