= Szijártóháza =

Coordinates: 46°38′N 16°27′E

- Village
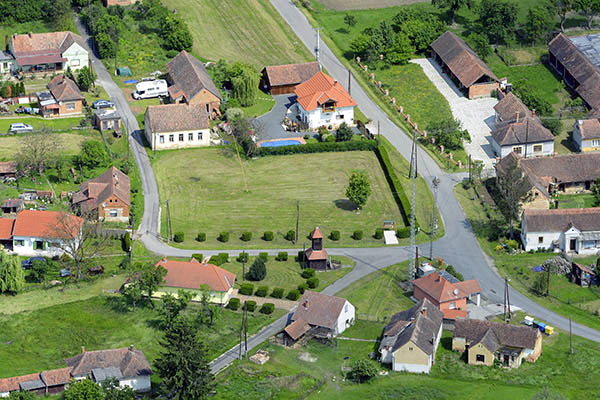
- Szijártóháza légi fotó
- Interactive map of Szijártóháza
- Country: Hungary
- Region: Western Transdanubia
- County: Zala County
- Time zone: UTC+1 (CET)
  - Summer (DST): UTC+2 (CEST)

Szijártóháza is a village in Zala County, Hungary.
