= Lesenceistvánd =

- Flag Coat of arms

- Location of Veszprém county in Hungary

- Location of Lesenceistvánd
- Coordinates: 46.87024°N 17.36010°E
- Country: Hungary
- County: Veszprém

Area
  - Total: 8.64 km^{2} (3.34 sq mi)

Population (2004)
  - Total: 975
  - Density: 112.84/km^{2} (292.3/sq mi)
- Time zone: UTC+1 (CET)
  - Summer (DST): UTC+2 (CEST)
- Postal code: 8319
- Area code: 87

Lesenceistvánd is a village in Veszprém county, Hungary.
