= Lovászi =

Coordinates: 46°33′N 16°34′E

- Village
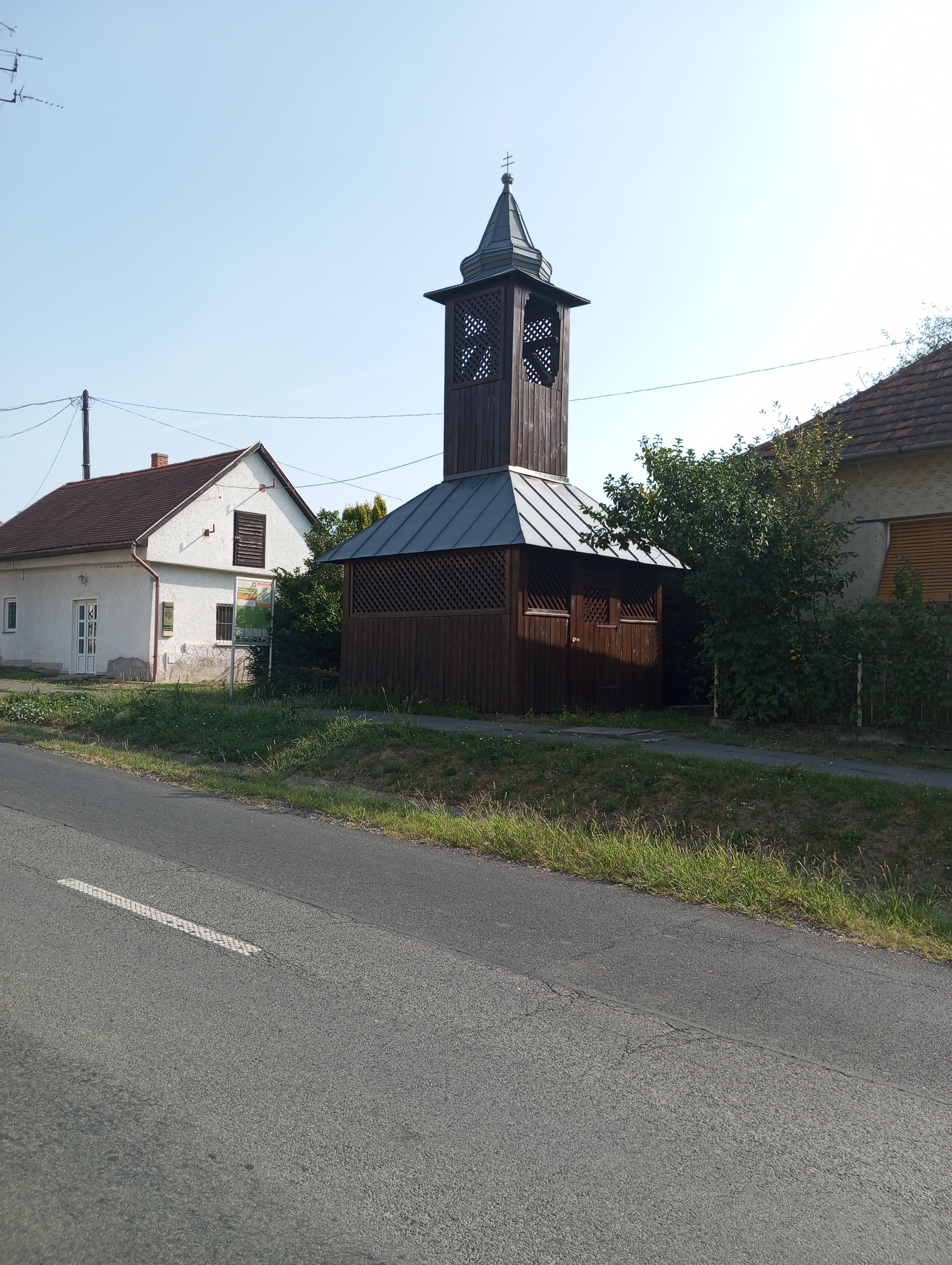
- Interactive map of Lovászi
- Country: Hungary
- Region: Western Transdanubia
- County: Zala County

Government
  - Mayor: Ferenc Léránt

Area
  - Total: 371 sq mi (962 km^{2})

Population (2015)
  - Total: 1,194
  - Density: 32,030/sq mi (12,368/km^{2})
- Time zone: UTC+1 (CET)
  - Summer (DST): UTC+2 (CEST)

Lovászi is a village in Zala County, Hungary.
