= Magyarföld =

Coordinates: 46°47′N 16°25′E

- Village
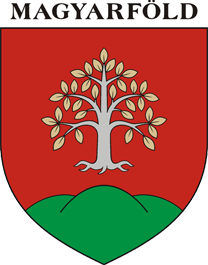
- Seal
- Interactive map of Magyarföld
- Country: Hungary
- Region: Western Transdanubia
- County: Zala County
- Time zone: UTC+1 (CET)
  - Summer (DST): UTC+2 (CEST)

Magyarföld is a village in Zala County, Hungary.
