= Felsőszenterzsébet =

Coordinates: 46°45′N 16°27′E

- Village
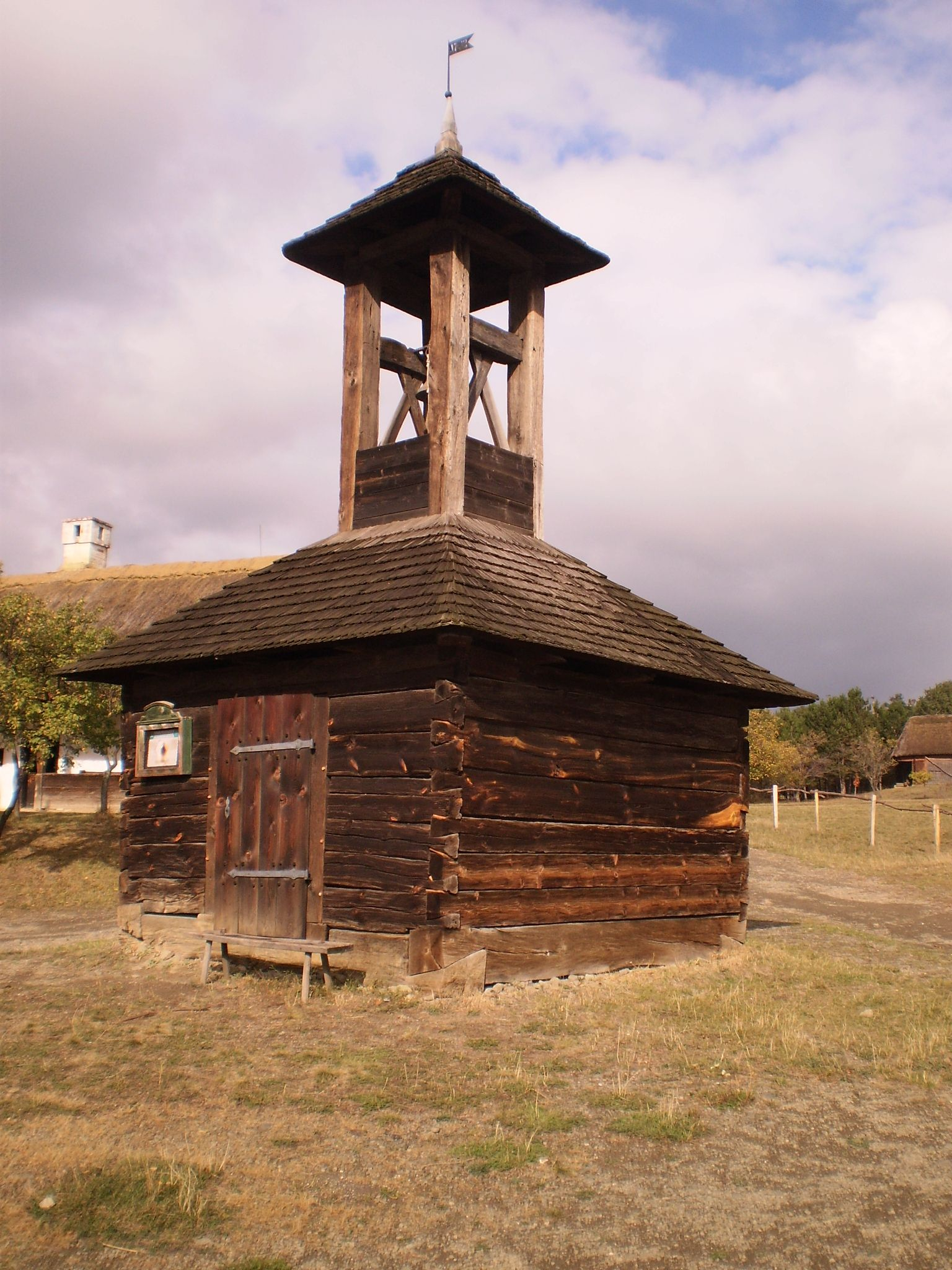
- Harangláb Felsőszenterzsébet
- Interactive map of Felsőszenterzsébet
- Country: Hungary
- Region: Western Transdanubia
- County: Zala County
- Time zone: UTC+1 (CET)
  - Summer (DST): UTC+2 (CEST)

Felsőszenterzsébet is a village in Zala County, Hungary.
