= Lendvajakabfa =

- Village
- Flag Coat of arms

- Location of Lendvajakabfa
- Coordinates: 46.67588°N 16.44269°E
- Country: Hungary
- Region: Western Transdanubia
- County: Zala
- District: Lenti

Area
  - Total: 6.18 km^{2} (2.39 sq mi)

Population (1 January 2026)
  - Total: 38
  - Density: 6.1/km^{2} (16/sq mi)
- Time zone: UTC+1 (CET)
  - Summer (DST): UTC+2 (CEST)
- Postal code: 8977
- Area code: (+36) 92

Lendvajakabfa is a village in Zala County, Hungary.
