= Mikekarácsonyfa =

- Village
- Flag Coat of arms

- Location of Mikekarácsonyfa
- Coordinates: 46.66005°N 16.69438°E
- Country: Hungary
- Region: Western Transdanubia
- County: Zala
- District: Lenti

Area
  - Total: 8.5 km^{2} (3.3 sq mi)

Population (1 January 2026)
  - Total: 303
  - Density: 36/km^{2} (92/sq mi)
- Time zone: UTC+1 (CET)
  - Summer (DST): UTC+2 (CEST)
- Postal code: 8949
- Area code: (+36) 92

Mikekarácsonyfa is a village in Zala County, Hungary.
