= Ramocsa =

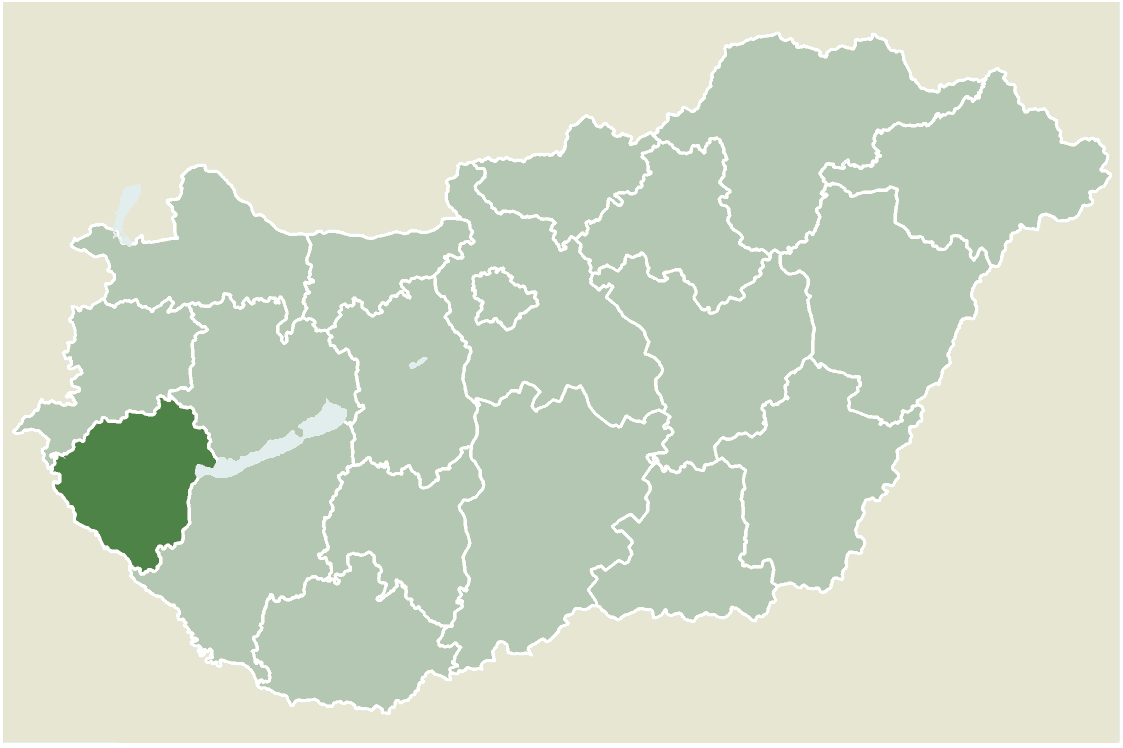
- Location of Zala county in Hungary

- Location of Ramocsa
- Coordinates: 46.77557°N 16.44727°E
- Country: Hungary
- County: Zala

Area
  - Total: 2.73 km^{2} (1.05 sq mi)

Population (2004)
  - Total: 47
  - Density: 17.21/km^{2} (44.6/sq mi)
- Time zone: UTC+1 (CET)
  - Summer (DST): UTC+2 (CEST)
- Postal code: 8973
- Area code: 92

Ramocsa is a village in Zala County, Hungary.
