= Lenti =

- Town
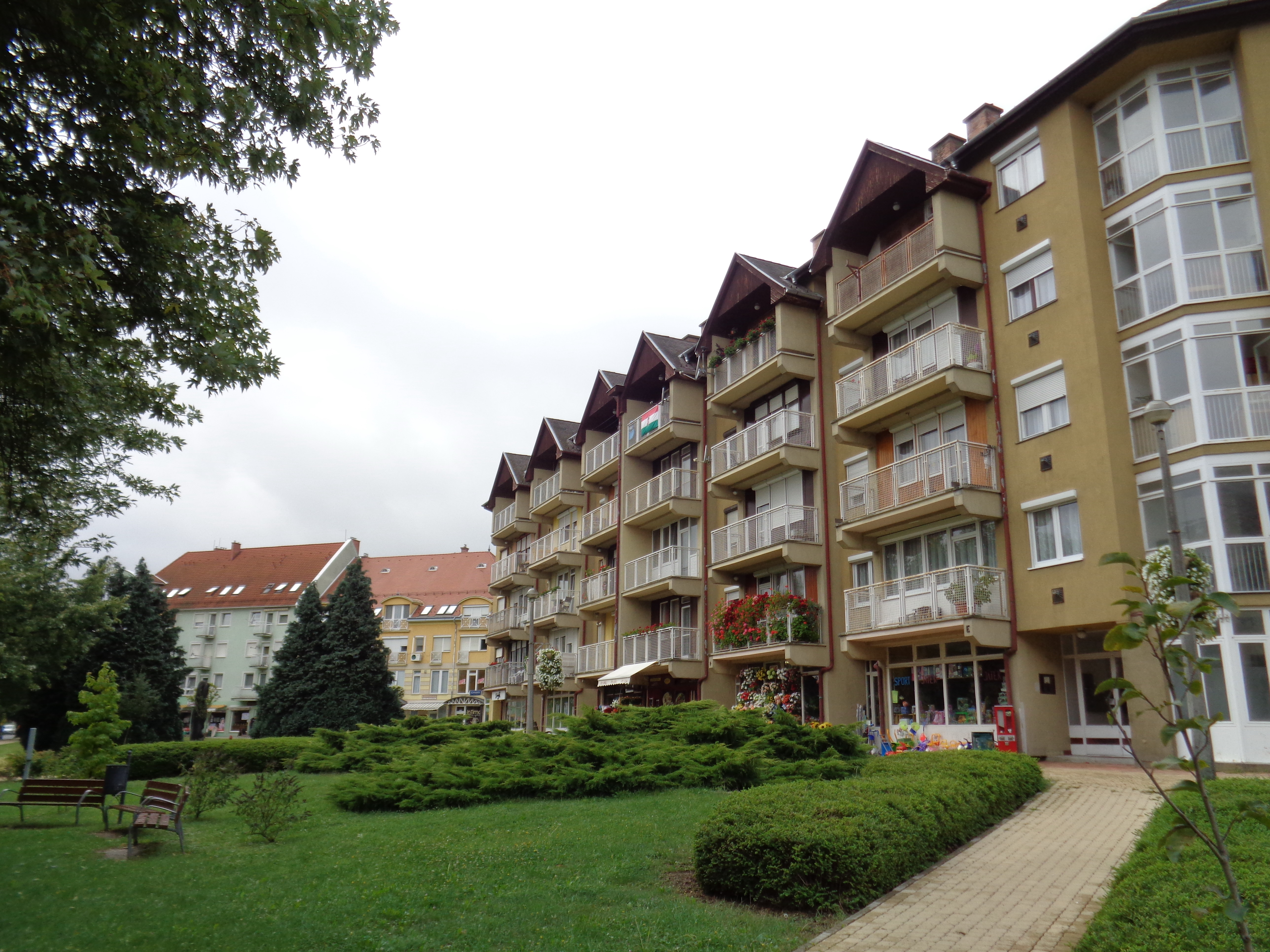
- Town centre

- Flag Coat of arms

- Location of Lenti
- Coordinates: 46.623761°N 16.54598°E
- Country: Hungary
- County: Zala
- District: Lenti

Area
  - Total: 73.80 km^{2} (28.49 sq mi)

Population (2001)
  - Total: 8,541
  - Density: 115.73/km^{2} (299.7/sq mi)
- Time zone: UTC+1 (CET)
  - Summer (DST): UTC+2 (CEST)
- Postal code: 8960
- Area code: (+36) 92
- Website: www.lenti.hu

Lenti (Slovene: Lentiba) is a town in Zala County, Hungary, located near the border with Austria, Slovenia and Croatia.

== Gallery ==
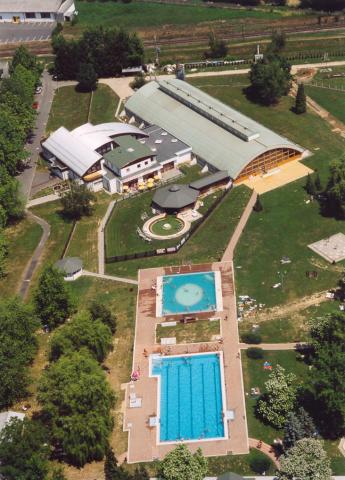

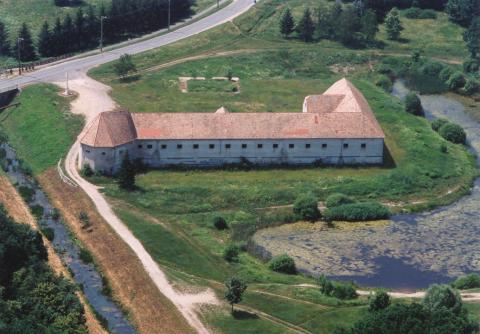

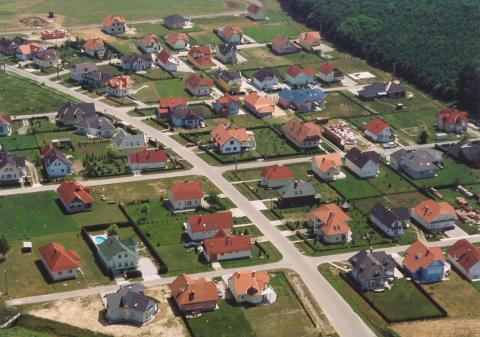

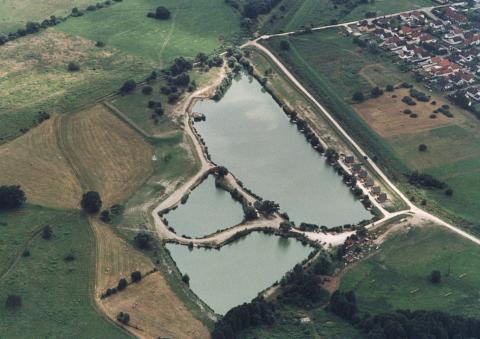

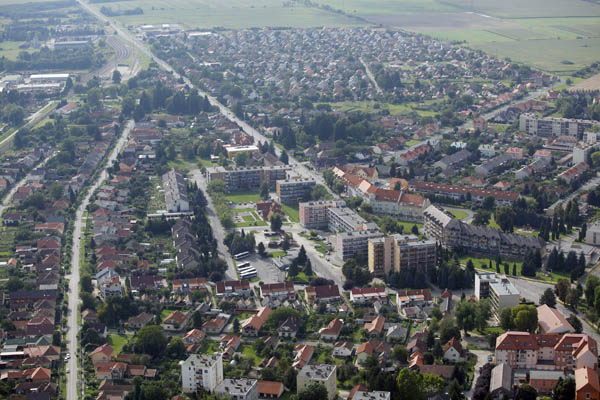

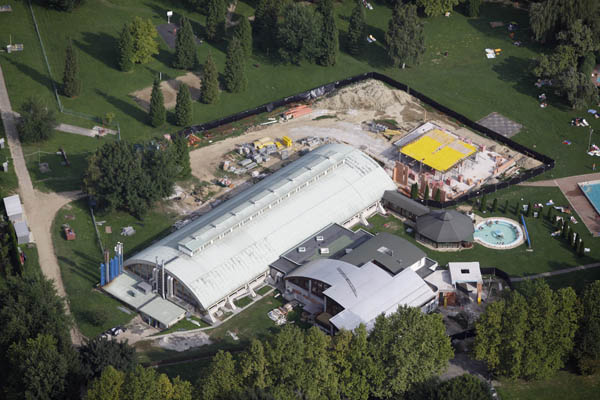

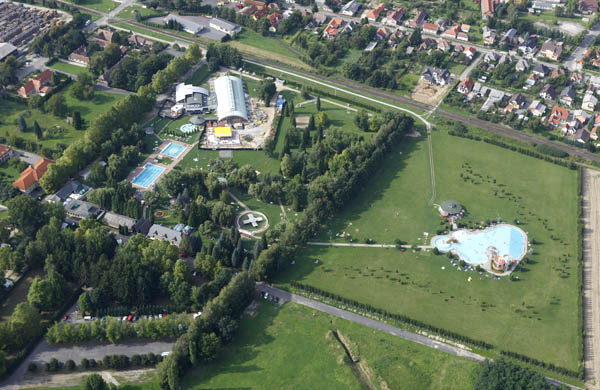

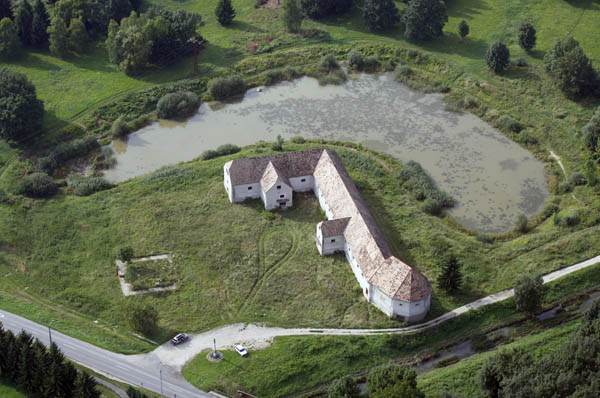

== Famous inhabitants ==
- József Sári (1935-), composer
- László Lackner (1943-), writer

== International relations ==
=== Twin towns — Sister cities ===
Lenti is twinned with Bad Radkersburg, Austria, and Lendava, Slovenia.

== Sports ==
The local sports team is Lenti TE.
