= Baglad =

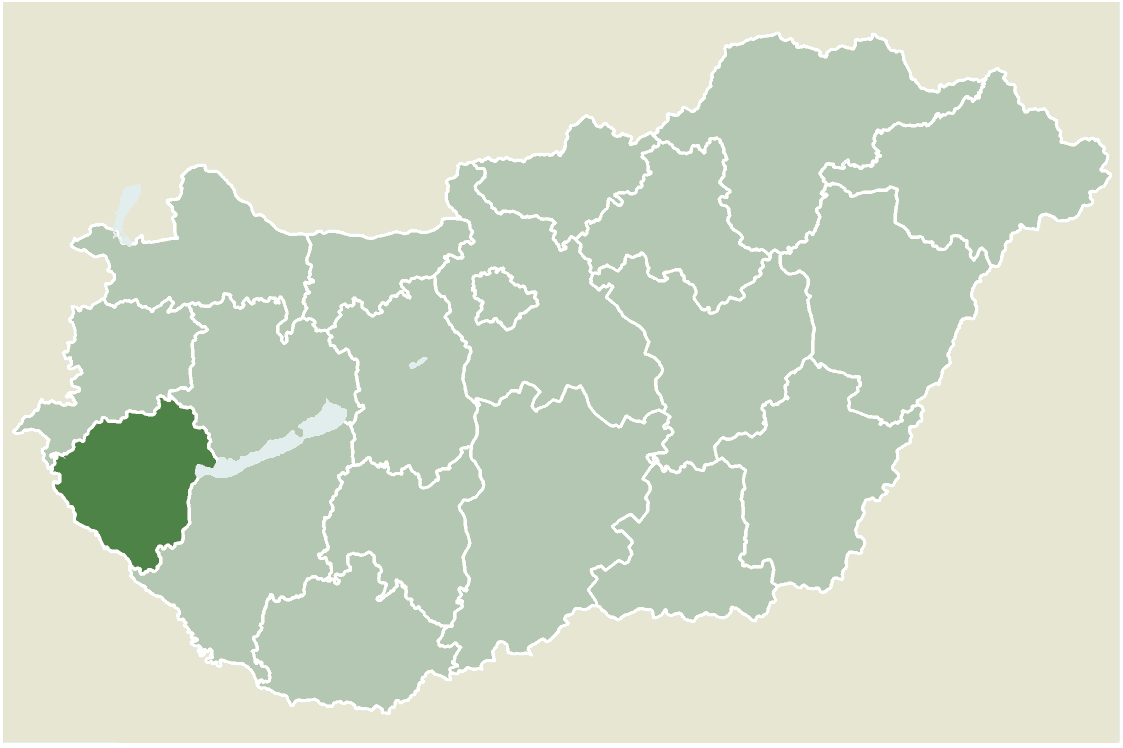
- Location of Zala county in Hungary

- Location of Baglad
- Coordinates: 46.68074°N 16.48437°E
- Country: Hungary
- County: Zala

Area
  - Total: 4.86 km^{2} (1.88 sq mi)

Population (2004)
  - Total: 60
  - Density: 12.34/km^{2} (32.0/sq mi)
- Time zone: UTC+1 (CET)
  - Summer (DST): UTC+2 (CEST)
- Postal code: 8977
- Area code: 92

Baglad is a village in Zala County, Hungary.
