= Gosztola =

Coordinates: 46°35′19″N 16°31′32″E

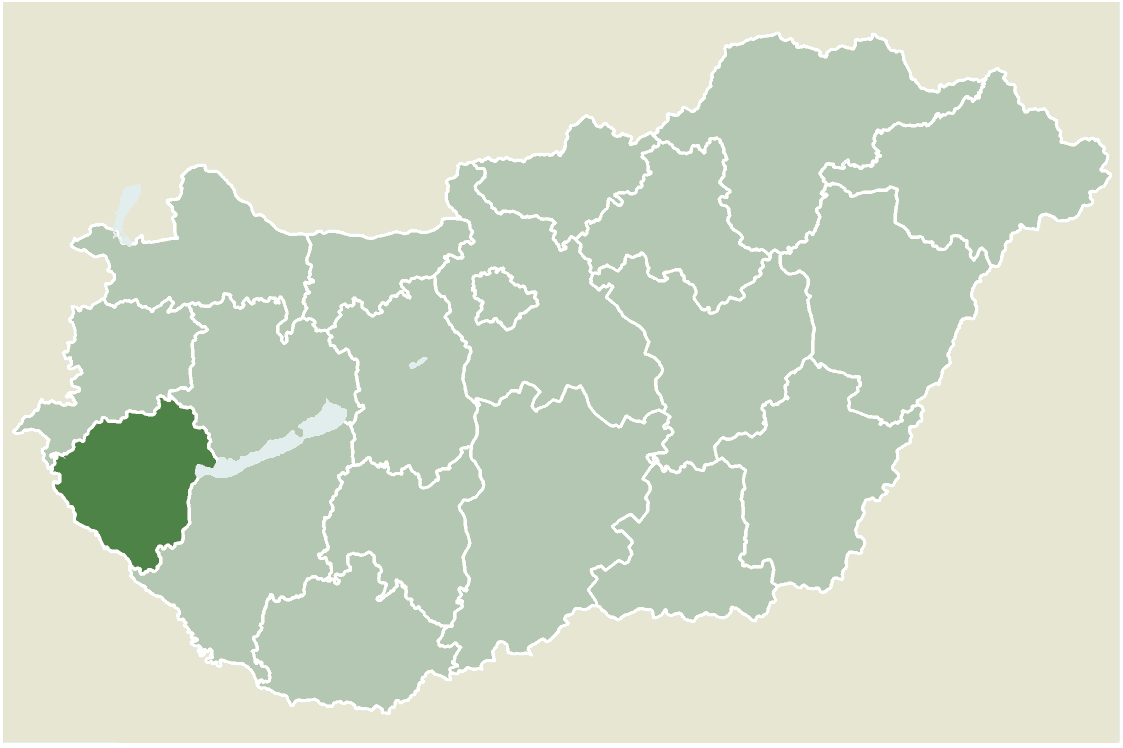
- Location of Zala county in Hungary
- Country: Hungary
- County: Zala

Area
  - Total: 6.98 km^{2} (2.69 sq mi)

Population (2004)
  - Total: 36
  - Density: 5.15/km^{2} (13.3/sq mi)
- Time zone: UTC+1 (CET)
  - Summer (DST): UTC+2 (CEST)
- Postal code: 8978
- Area code: 92

Gosztola is a village in Zala County, Hungary.
