= Lendvadedes =

Coordinates: 46°34′52″N 16°30′32″E

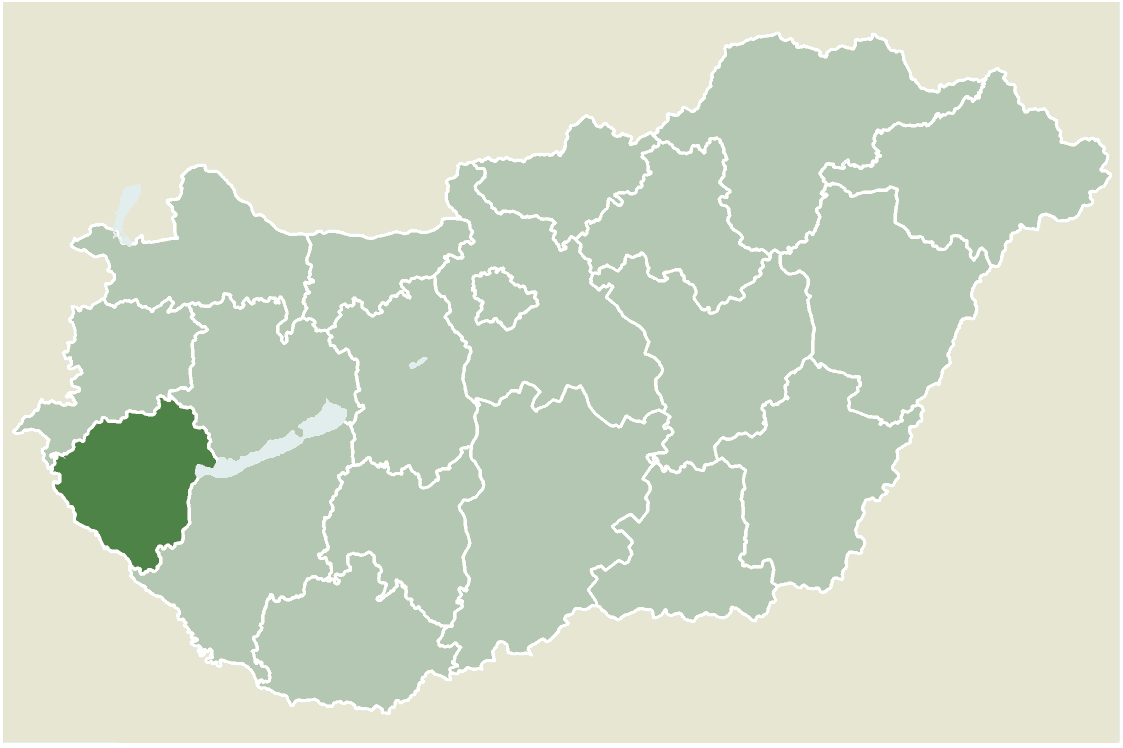
- Location of Zala county in Hungary
- Country: Hungary
- County: Zala

Area
  - Total: 4.02 km^{2} (1.55 sq mi)

Population (2004)
  - Total: 33
  - Density: 8.2/km^{2} (21/sq mi)
- Time zone: UTC+1 (CET)
  - Summer (DST): UTC+2 (CEST)
- Postal code: 8978
- Area code: 92

Lendvadedes (Croatian: Didaš) is a village in Zala County, Hungary.
