= Western Transdanubia =

Coordinates: 47°41′3″N 17°38′6″E

Western Transdanubia Nyugat-Dunántúl
- Region
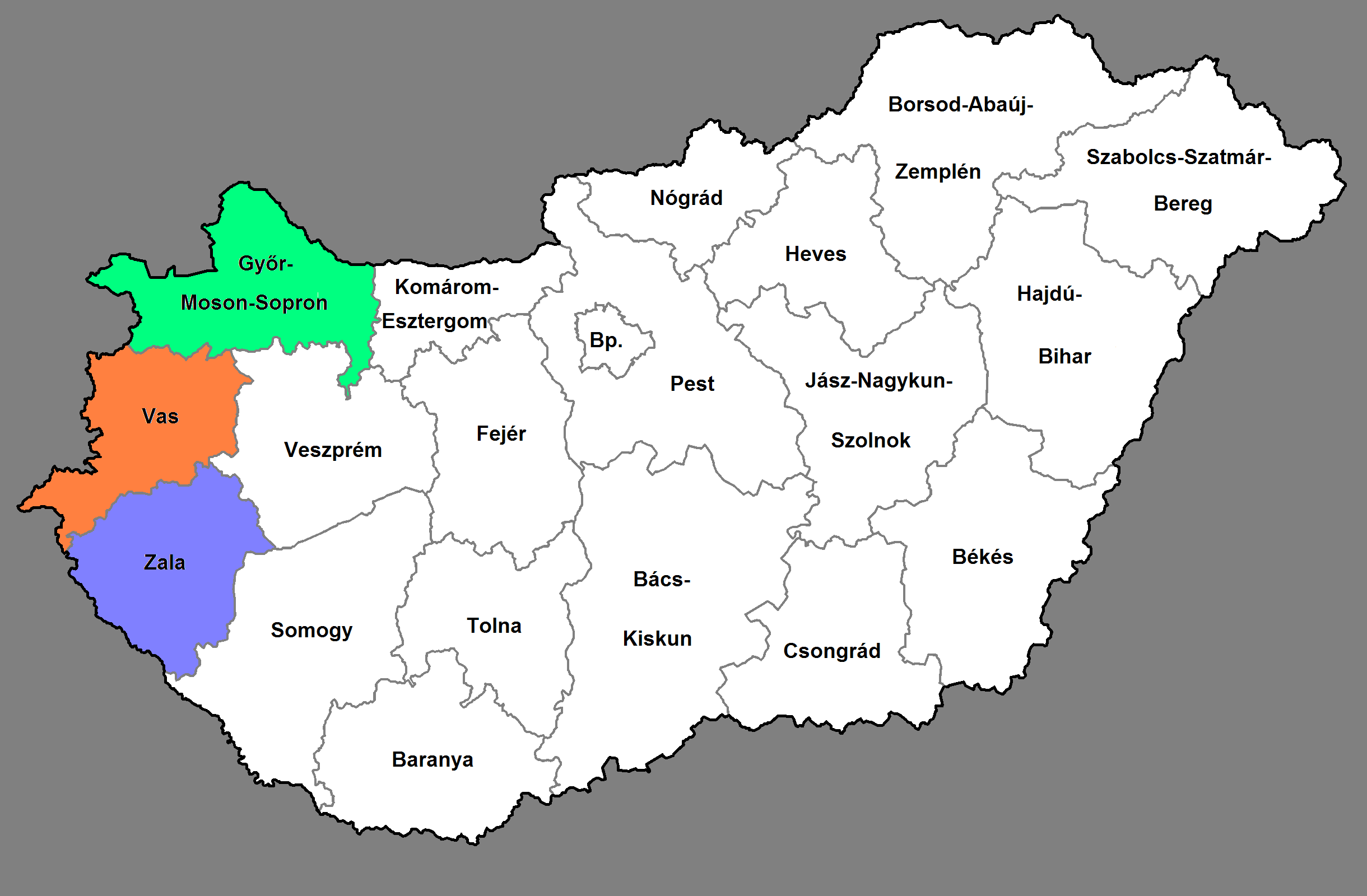
- Country: Hungary
- Seat: Győr

Area
  - Total: 11,209 km^{2} (4,328 sq mi)

Population (2024)
  - Total: 997,939

GDP
  - Total: €18.317 billion (2024)
  - Per capita: €18,806 (2024)
- Time zone: UTC+1 (CET)
  - Summer (DST): UTC+2 (CEST)
- NUTS code: HU22
- HDI (2019): 0.866 very high · 2nd

Western Transdanubia (Hungarian: Nyugat-Dunántúl [ˈɲuɡɒt ˈdunaːntuːl]) is a subdivision of Hungary as defined by the Nomenclature of Territorial Units for Statistics (NUTS). It is one of the eight classified NUTS-2 statistical regions of Hungary. The region incorporates the -western parts of the country, and encompasses an area of 11,209 km^{2} (4,328 sq mi). It incorporates three counties – Zala, Vas, and Győr-Moson-Sopron. It has a population of about one million, and the seat of the region and the largest city is Győr.

== Classification ==
The country of Hungary was organized into eight regions for administrative purposes by the amendments of Act XXI of 1996. The Nomenclature of Territorial Units for Statistics (NUTS) organizes the country into three broader level sub-divisions. These are classified as a NUTS-2 statistical regions of Hungary, and incorporate one or more counties within it. The regions form the NUTS-3 territorial units under them.

== Geography ==
Western Transdanubia incorporates the south-western parts of the country, encompassing an area of 11,209 km^{2} (4,328 sq mi). The region is located in Central Europe, and is completely land locked as Hungary does not have access to sea. It shares an international land border with Austria to the west, and Slovenia to the south-west. It is bordered by Central Transdanubia to the east, and Southern Transdanubia to the south-east. The region is fertile, and rich in minerals. The region has numerous thermal springs.

The topography of the region is varied with fertile lands on the slopes of Zala hills and the foothills of the Alps. The upper reaches of the Zala Hills were covered by forests of pine and beech. Duna River is the major water source in the region. Western Transdanubia incorporates three counties – Zala, Vas, and Győr-Moson-Sopron.

== Demographics and economy ==
The region has a population of about one million. The population is largely rural. The region contributes to around 11% of Hungary's total Gross Domestic Product. Agriculture and tourism are the chief economic drivers. The region is rich in thermal springs. Various types of white and red wines are produced in the wine-growing areas of the region.

== See also ==
- List of regions of Hungary
