= Göcsej =

Göcsej is a geographic and ethnic region within Zala County, Hungary.

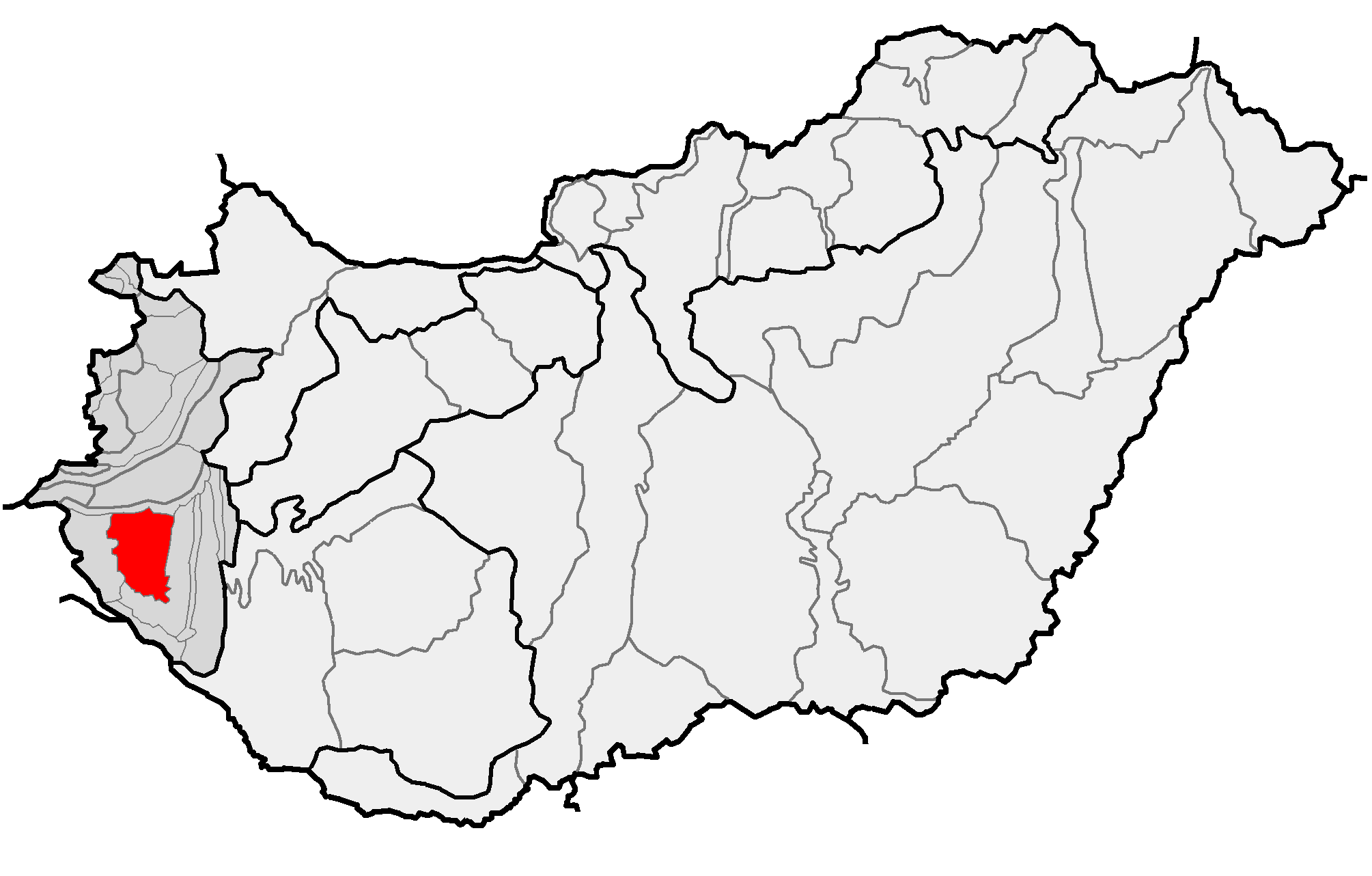
Göcsej (in red) as one of microregions within physical subdivisions of Hungary

== Geography and climate ==
Göcsej is a region of steep hills, bordered by the Zala, Kerka, and Válicka rivers; however, its ethnic boundary does not exactly align with these geographic boundaries. Göcsej has a sub-alpine climate and vegetation. Although it gets the most precipitation in Hungary, the soil is barely suitable for crop production. As late as the beginning of the 19th century, the hills were covered by huge oaks, European beech, and Scots pines. The slopes and hilltops have yellowish-red, clayey soil and the valleys, before drainages projects started in the 20th century, used to have boggy marshlands. As the valleys flooded at snow melting or after heavy rains, the original settlers built mostly on the slopes, less often on the ridges or crests of hills.

== History of the name "szeg" ==
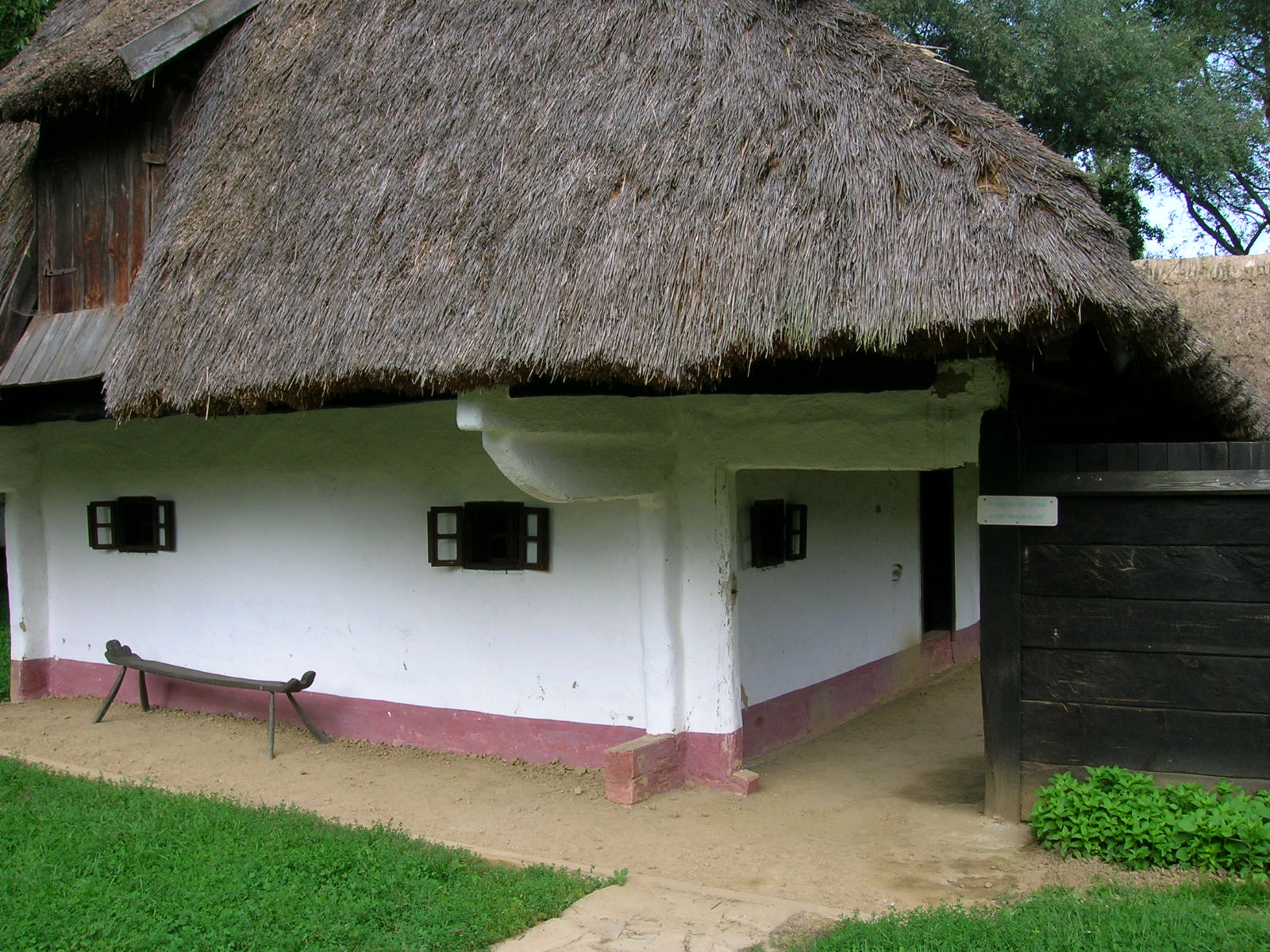
An old house from Göcsej

The first written record of Göcsej is from 1689 under the name "Göböcse". At the beginning of the 19th century "Göcse" and "Göcsej" names have also occurred. Some scholars trace the origin of name to "göcs" (lump, clod) referring to soil properties, others traced it back to "göcsörtös" (gnarled) or "görbe" (warped) referring to the hilliness of the area. Göcsej is the country of "szeg"s. It refers to settlement pattern, where the village is made up of groups of houses perched on hilltops or in clearings. This loose, scattered arrangement is characteristic of the northern and central parts of Göcsej. The flat areas have houses lining street sides.

== History of the Göcsej people: The historical borderland, the area of the "szegs", and the area in between ==
Hungarians settled here after their conquest of the Carpathian Basin in the 9th and 10th Centuries. In those days the borderland toward the North was located which is now the South-Western part of Zala County. Along the border, settlements were made by frontier guards. Such a settlement was Lövő or Zalalövő where the "Lövők" (shooters) lived. Whereas the Mongol Invasion (1241–42) destroyed the organization of military border zones, the frontier guards stayed and the majority of them became serfs.

The country of "szeg"s began to be populated at the end of the 10th century. The privileged class of the managing and administrative system of the Kingdom of Hungary, established by King St.Stephen I (Hungarian: Szent István), and their serfs settled in these parts. The majority of the serves provided military service, in return they were provided by land, and some privileges of nobility. These petty nobles lead a peasant lifestyle. Their settlements had a dominant influence on the formation of the characteristic structure of Göcsej settlements, the "szeg"s. Their homesteads were established in the woods covering the slopes and hilltops; some derive the world "szeg" from this fact (szeg, szeglet = corner of the woods). Often settlements were named after the family that settled the area, e.g., Kustánszeg, Gombosszeg and others including the extension "szeg" after the family name.

The villages between the Göcsej "szeg"s and the settlements of the frontier guards were inhabited partly by petty nobles of castle serf origin and partly by castlepeople of lower legal standing, castle servants, whose descendants became serfs in later centuries. These villages that evolved on the flatter stretches of land along the main roads and on the banks of a brook or a river, could more easily expand than the settlements of the szegs. These settlements had a more regular organization, houses arranged along one or more streets. These too were often named after the first inhabitants e.g. Budafa, Kálócfa, Náprádfa (Family name + fa, meaning tree). In summary, many descendants of frontier guards, castle people and castle serfs live here up to present days.

== Survival of the peasant culture in Göcsej ==
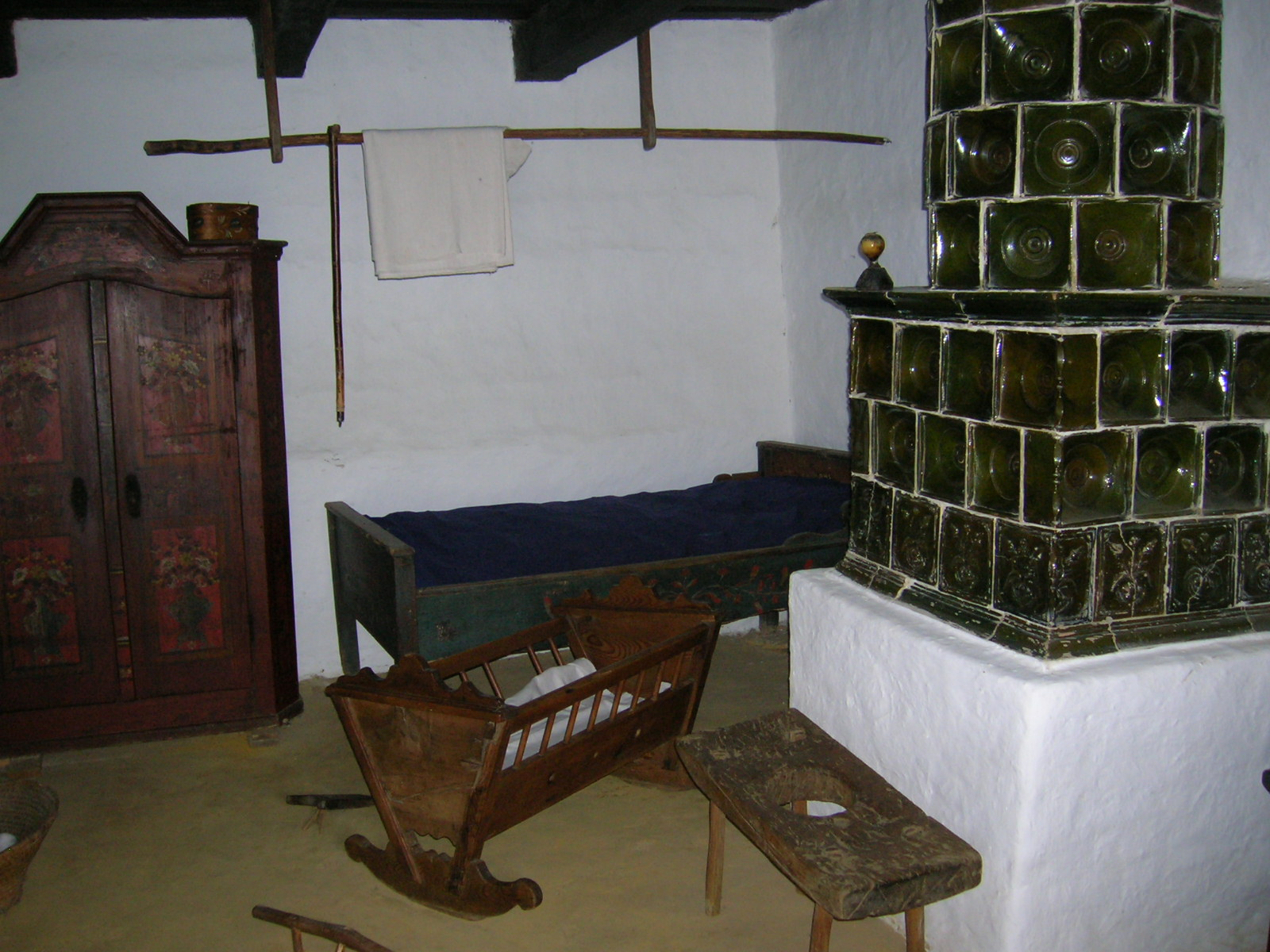
Interior of an old "Göcsej" house

In spite the devastation caused by the Turks in the 16th and 17th centuries, the region's peasant culture remained largely intact for hundreds of years. It retained its archaic culture well into first decades of the 20th century. Despite a gradual change to intensive animal husbandry in the second half of the 19th century the isolation of Göcsej villages slowed the pace of change.

== Settlements of Göcsej ==
- Babosdöbréte
- Bak
- Baktüttös
- Barlahida
- Becsvölgye
- Bocfölde
- Böde
- Csonkahegyhát
- Dobronhegy
- Gellénháza
- Gombosszeg
- Hottó
- Iborfia
- Kustánszeg
- Lickóvadamos
- Milejszeg
- Nagylengyel
- Németfalu
- Nova
- Ormándlak
- Pálfiszeg
- Petrikeresztúr
- Pusztaederics
- Sárhida
- Szentkozmadombja
- Tófej
- Zalatárnok
- Zalaegerszeg
- Zalalövő
