= Zalaegerszeg District =

Coordinates: 46.83890718754358°N 16.8437846202592°E

Zalaegerszeg District Zalaegerszegi járás
- Districts of Hungary
- Coat of arms

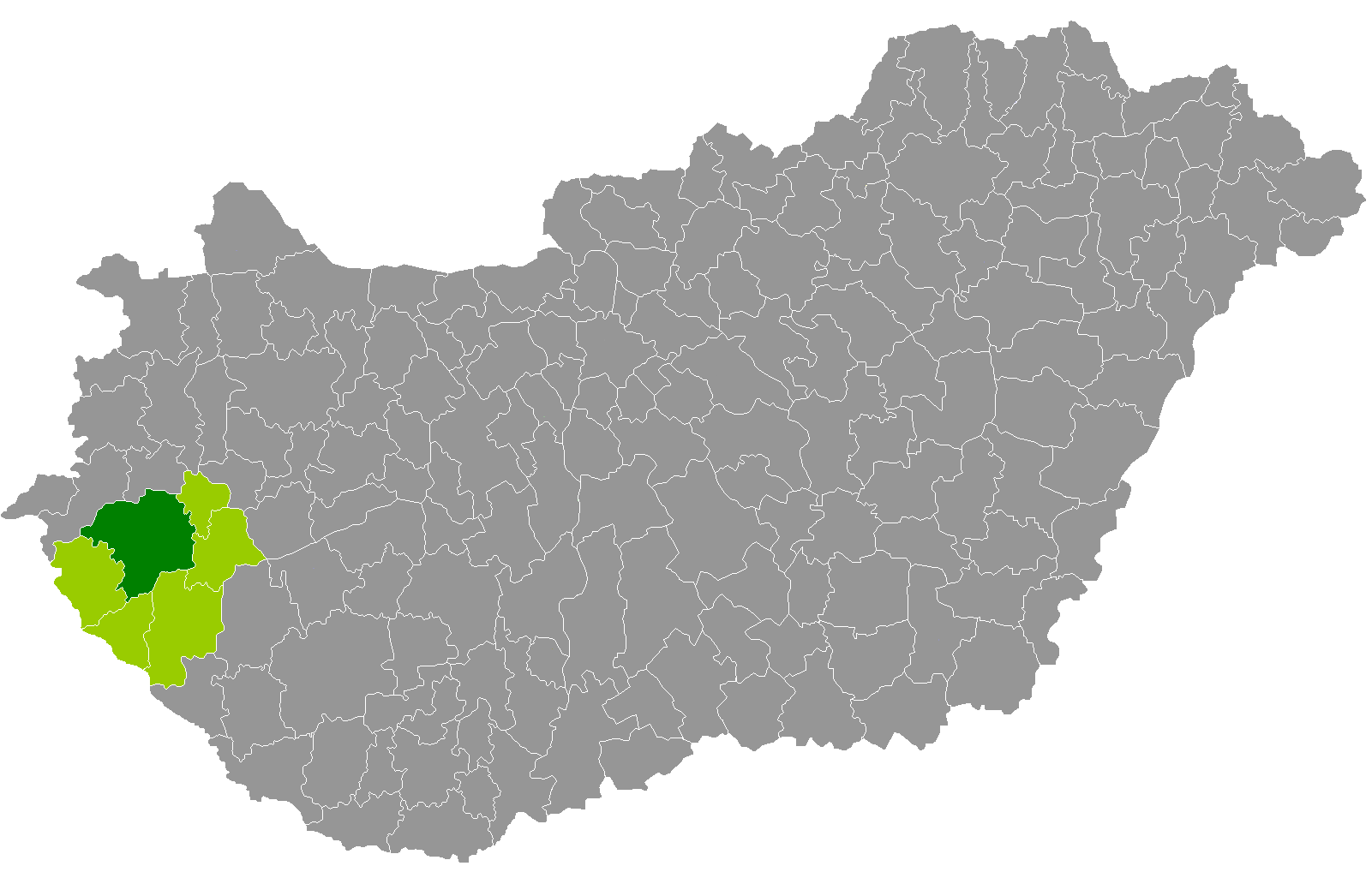
- Zalaegerszeg District within Hungary and Zala County.
- Country: Hungary
- County: Zala
- District seat: Zalaegerszeg

Area
  - Total: 1,044.70 km^{2} (403.36 sq mi)
  - Rank: 1st in Zala

Population (2011 census)
  - Total: 102,798
  - Rank: 1st in Zala
  - Density: 98/km^{2} (250/sq mi)

Zalaegerszeg (Hungarian: Zalaegerszegi járás) is a district in northern part of Zala County. Zalaegerszeg is also the name of the town where the district seat is found. The district is located in the Western Transdanubia Statistical Region.

== Geography ==
Zalaegerszeg District borders with Vasvár District (Vas County) to the north, Zalaszentgrót District to the northeast, Keszthely District to the east, Nagykanizsa District and Letenye District to the south, Lenti District to the west, Körmend District (Vas County) to the northwest. The number of the inhabited places in Zalaegerszeg District is 84.

== Municipalities ==
The district has 1 urban county, 2 towns and 81 villages. (ordered by population, as of 1 January 2013)

- Alibánfa (407)
- Almásháza (63)
- Alsónemesapáti (676)
- Babosdöbréte (466)
- Bagod (1,254)
- Bak (1,628)
- Baktüttös (333)
- Becsvölgye (791)
- Bezeréd (141)
- Bocfölde (1,123)
- Boncodfölde (346)
- Böde (296)
- Búcsúszentlászló (811)
- Csatár (550)
- Csertalakos (27)
- Csonkahegyhát (326)
- Csöde (80)
- Dobronhegy (142)
- Egervár (1,051)
- Gellénháza (1,571)
- Gombosszeg (36)
- Gősfa (321)
- Gutorfölde (1,051)
- Gyűrűs (96)
- Hagyárosbörönd (310)
- Hottó (327)
- Iborfia (9)
- Kávás (247)
- Kemendollár (523)
- Keménfa (90)
- Kisbucsa (450)
- Kiskutas (171)
- Kispáli (291)
- Kustánszeg (481)
- Lakhegy (453)
- Lickóvadamos (198)
- Milejszeg (308)
- Misefa (291)
- Nagykapornak (925)
- Nagykutas (422)
- Nagylengyel (509)
- Nagypáli (477)
- Nemesapáti (519)
- Nemeshetés (262)
- Nemesrádó (295)
- Nemessándorháza (302)
- Nemesszentandrás (270)
- Németfalu (190)
- Orbányosfa (126)
- Ormándlak (122)
- Ozmánbük (198)
- **Pacsa** (1,676)
- Padár (112)
- Pálfiszeg (159)
- Pethőhenye (418)
- Petrikeresztúr (370)
- Pókaszepetk (937)
- Pölöske (842)
- Pusztaederics (166)
- Pusztaszentlászló (598)
- Salomvár (615)
- Sárhida (796)
- Söjtör (1,461)
- Szentkozmadombja (67)
- Szentpéterfölde (132)
- Szentpéterúr (1,003)
- Teskánd (1,116)
- Tilaj (195)
- Tófej (713)
- Vasboldogasszony (610)
- Vaspör (373)
- Vöckönd (103)
- Zalaboldogfa (334)
- Zalacséb (514)
- **Zalaegerszeg** (59,618) – district and county seat
- Zalaháshágy (371)
- Zalaigrice (119)
- Zalaistvánd (352)
- **Zalalövő** (3,058)
- Zalaszentgyörgy (408)
- Zalaszentiván (1,042)
- Zalaszentlőrinc (279)
- Zalaszentmihály (971)
- Zalatárnok (673)

The bolded municipalities are cities.

== See also ==
- List of cities and towns in Hungary
