= List of populated places in Hungary (Cs) =

This is a list of cities, towns and villages of Hungary

KEY: T = Town ; V = Village

Name	Rank	County	District	Population	Post code
Csabacsud	V	Békés	Szarvasi	2,102	5551
Csabaszabadi	V	Békés	Békéscsabai	366	5609
Csabdi	V	Fejér	Bicskei	1,162	2064
Csabrendek	V	Veszprém	Sümegi	3,011	8474
Csáfordjánosfa	V	Gyor-Moson-Sopron	Sopron–Fertodi	246	9375
Csaholc	V	Szabolcs-Szatmár-Bereg	Fehérgyarmati	527	4967
Csajág	V	Veszprém	Balatonalmádi	889	8163
Csákány	V	Somogy	Marcali	287	8735
Csákánydoroszló	V	Vas	Körmendi	1,785	9919
Csákberény	V	Fejér	Móri	1,242	8073
Csákvár	V	Fejér	Bicskei	5,316	8083
Csanádalberti	V	Csongrád	Makói	496	6915
Csanádapáca	V	Békés	Orosházi	2,877	5662
Csanádpalota	V	Csongrád	Makói	3,309	6913
Csánig	V	Vas	Sárvári	438	9654
Csány	V	Heves	Hatvani	4,787	3015
Csányoszró	V	Baranya	Sellyei	718	7964
Csanytelek	V	Csongrád	Csongrádi	2,975	6647
Csapi	V	Zala	Nagykanizsai	184	8756
Csapod	V	Gyor-Moson-Sopron	Sopron–Fertodi	572	9372
Csárdaszállás	V	Békés	Békési	545	5621
Csarnóta	V	Baranya	Siklósi	149	7811
Csaroda	V	Szabolcs-Szatmár-Bereg	Vásárosnaményi	654	4844
Császár	V	Komárom-Esztergom	Kisbéri	1,926	2858
Császártöltés	V	Bács-Kiskun	Kiskorösi	2,648	6239
Császló	V	Szabolcs-Szatmár-Bereg	Fehérgyarmati	387	4973
Csátalja	V	Bács-Kiskun	Bajai	1,732	6523
Csatár	V	Zala	Zalaegerszegi	568	8943
Csataszög	V	Jász-Nagykun-Szolnok	Szolnoki	314	5064
Csatka	V	Komárom-Esztergom	Kisbéri	309	2888
Csávoly	V	Bács-Kiskun	Bajai	2,061	6448
Csebény	V	Baranya	Szigetvári	117	7935
Csécse	V	Nógrád	Pásztói	994	3052
Csegöld	V	Szabolcs-Szatmár-Bereg	Fehérgyarmati	677	4742
Csehbánya	V	Veszprém	Ajkai	283	8445
Csehi	V	Vas	Vasvári	308	9833
Csehimindszent	V	Vas	Vasvári	422	9834
Csém	V	Komárom-Esztergom	Komáromi	478	2949
Csemo	V	Pest	Ceglédi	4,273	2713
Csempeszkopács	V	Vas	Szombathelyi	306	9764
Csengele	V	Csongrád	Kisteleki	2,049	6765
Csenger	T	Szabolcs-Szatmár-Bereg	Csengeri	5,211	4765
Csengersima	V	Szabolcs-Szatmár-Bereg	Csengeri	707	4743
Csengerújfalu	V	Szabolcs-Szatmár-Bereg	Csengeri	892	4764
Csengod	V	Bács-Kiskun	Kiskorösi	2,323	6222
Csénye	V	Vas	Sárvári	636	9611
Csenyéte	V	Borsod-Abaúj-Zemplén	Encsi	393	3837
Csép	V	Komárom-Esztergom	Kisbéri	363	2946
Csépa	V	Jász-Nagykun-Szolnok	Kunszentmártoni	1,866	5475
Csepreg	T	Tolna	Csepregi	3,612	9735
Csér	V	Gyor-Moson-Sopron	Sopron–Fertodi	47	9375
Cserdi	V	Baranya	Szentlorinci	350	7683
Cserénfa	V	Somogy	Kaposvári	243	7472
Cserépfalu	V	Borsod-Abaúj-Zemplén	Mezokövesdi	1,095	3413
Cserépváralja	V	Borsod-Abaúj-Zemplén	Mezokövesdi	553	3417
Cserháthaláp	V	Nógrád	Balassagyarmati	411	2694
Cserhátsurány	V	Nógrád	Balassagyarmati	960	2676
Cserhátszentiván	V	Nógrád	Pásztói	170	3066
Cserkeszolo	V	Jász-Nagykun-Szolnok	Kunszentmártoni	2,231	5465
Cserkút	V	Baranya	Pécsi	430	7673
Csernely	V	Borsod-Abaúj-Zemplén	Ózdi	958	3648
Cserszegtomaj	V	Zala	Keszthely–Hévízi	2,025	8372
Csertalakos	V	Zala	Lenti	48	8951
Cserto	V	Baranya	Szigetvári	448	7900
Csesznek	V	Veszprém	Zirci	588	8419
Csesztreg	V	Zala	Lenti	854	8973
Csesztve	V	Nógrád	Balassagyarmati	330	2678
Csetény	V	Veszprém	Zirci	2,068	8417
Csévharaszt	V	Pest	Monori	1,868	2212
Csibrák	V	Tolna	Dombóvári	430	7225
Csikéria	V	Bács-Kiskun	Bácsalmási	995	6424
Csikóstottos	V	Tolna	Dombóvári	956	7341
Csikvánd	V	Gyor-Moson-Sopron	Téti	502	9127
Csincse	V	Borsod-Abaúj-Zemplén	Mezokövesdi	623	3442
Csipkerek	V	Vas	Vasvári	410	9836
Csitár	V	Nógrád	Balassagyarmati	449	2673
Csobád	V	Borsod-Abaúj-Zemplén	Encsi	730	3848
Csobaj	V	Borsod-Abaúj-Zemplén	Tokaji	808	3927
Csobánka	V	Pest	Szentendrei	2,855	2014
Csókako	V	Fejér	Móri	1,072	8074
Csokonyavisonta	V	Somogy	Barcsi	1,787	7555
Csokvaomány	V	Borsod-Abaúj-Zemplén	Ózdi	951	3647
Csolnok	V	Komárom-Esztergom	Dorogi	3,401	2521
Csólyospálos	V	Bács-Kiskun	Kiskunmajsai	1,893	6135
Csoma	V	Somogy	Kaposvári	455	7253
Csomád	V	Pest	Veresegyházi	866	2161
Csombárd	V	Somogy	Kaposvári	310	7432
Csongrád	T	Csongrád	Csongrádi	18,713	6640
Csonkahegyhát	V	Zala	Zalaegerszegi	346	8918
Csonkamindszent	V	Baranya	Szentlorinci	176	7940
Csopak	V	Veszprém	Balatonfüredi	1,577	8229
Csór	V	Fejér	Székesfehérvári	1,679	8041
Csorna	T	Gyor-Moson-Sopron	Csornai	10,810	9300
Csorvás	V	Békés	Orosházi	5,738	5920
Csót	V	Veszprém	Pápai	1,118	8558
Csöde	V	Zala	Zalaegerszegi	90	8991
Csögle	V	Veszprém	Ajkai	729	8495
Csökmo	V	Hajdú-Bihar	Berettyóújfalui	2,178	4145
Csököly	V	Somogy	Kaposvári	1,161	7526
Csömend	V	Somogy	Marcali	336	8700
Csömödér	V	Zala	Lenti	667	8957
Csömör	V	Pest	Gödölloi	7,510	2141
Csönge	V	Vas	Celldömölki	413	9513
Csörnyeföld	V	Zala	Letenyei	483	8873
Csörög	V	Pest	Váci	1,528	2135
Csörötnek	V	Vas	Szentgotthárdi	935	9962
Csosz	V	Fejér	Abai	1,053	8122
Csovár	V	Pest	Váci	704	2615
Csurgó	T	Somogy	Csurgói	5,783	8840
Csurgónagymarton	V	Somogy	Csurgói	214	8840

== Notes ==
- Cities marked with * have several different post codes, the one here is only the most general one.
