= List of populated places in Hungary (O–Ó) =

This is a list of cities, towns and villages of Hungary

KEY: T = Town ; V = Village

Name	Rank	County	District	Population	Post code
Óbánya	V	Baranya	Pécsváradi	155	7695
Óbarok	V	Fejér	Bicskei	796	2063
Óbudavár	V	Veszprém	Balatonfüredi	56	8272
Ócsa	V	Pest	Gyáli	8,791	2364
Ócsárd	V	Baranya	Pécsi	430	7814
Ófalu	V	Baranya	Pécsváradi	346	7695
Ófehértó	V	Szabolcs-Szatmár-Bereg	Baktalórántházai	2,746	4558
Óföldeák	V	Csongrád	Makói	507	6923
Óhid	V	Zala	Zalaszentgróti	651	8342
Okány	V	Békés	Sarkadi	2,984	5534
Okorág	V	Baranya	Sellyei	181	7957
Okorvölgy	V	Baranya	Szentlorinci	94	7681
Olasz	V	Baranya	Mohácsi	623	7745
Olaszfa	V	Tolna	Vasvári	492	9824
Olaszfalu	V	Veszprém	Zirci	1,116	8414
Olaszliszka	V	Borsod-Abaúj-Zemplén	Sárospataki	1,802	3933
Olcsva	V	Szabolcs-Szatmár-Bereg	Vásárosnaményi	732	4826
Olcsvaapáti	V	Szabolcs-Szatmár-Bereg	Fehérgyarmati	335	4914
Old	V	Baranya	Siklósi	371	7824
Ólmod	V	Tolna	Koszegi	92	9733
Oltárc	V	Zala	Letenyei	311	8886
Onga	V	Borsod-Abaúj-Zemplén	Miskolci	4,780	3562
Ónod	V	Borsod-Abaúj-Zemplén	Miskolci	2,517	3551
Ópályi	V	Szabolcs-Szatmár-Bereg	Mátészalkai	3,030	4821
Ópusztaszer	V	Csongrád	Kisteleki	2,326	6767
Orbányosfa	V	Zala	Zalaegerszegi	150	8935
Orci	V	Somogy	Kaposvári	562	7461
Ordacsehi	V	Somogy	Fonyódi	807	8635
Ordas	V	Bács-Kiskun	Kalocsai	504	6335
Orfalu	V	Tolna	Szentgotthárdi	65	9982
Orfu	V	Baranya	Pécsi	761	7677
Orgovány	V	Bács-Kiskun	Kecskeméti	3,464	6077
Ormándlak	V	Zala	Zalaegerszegi	129	8983
Ormosbánya	V	Borsod-Abaúj-Zemplén	Kazincbarcikai	1,880	3743
Orosháza	T	Békés	Orosházi	31,816	5900
Oroszi	V	Veszprém	Ajkai	144	8458
Oroszlány	T	Komárom-Esztergom	Oroszlányi	20,249	2840
Oroszló	V	Baranya	Sásdi	324	7370
Orosztony	V	Zala	Nagykanizsai	454	8744
Ortaháza	V	Zala	Lenti	154	8954
Osli	V	Gyor-Moson-Sopron	Kapuvári	897	9354
Ostffyasszonyfa	V	Vas	Celldömölki	839	9512
Ostoros	V	Heves	Egri	2,351	3326
Oszkó	V	Tolna	Vasvári	698	9825
Oszlár	V	Borsod-Abaúj-Zemplén	Tiszaújvárosi	449	3591
Osztopán	V	Somogy	Kaposvári	863	7444
Ózd	T	Borsod-Abaúj-Zemplén	Ózdi	38,784	3600
Ózdfalu	V	Baranya	Sellyei	179	7836
Ozmánbük	V	Zala	Zalaegerszegi	225	8998
Ozora	V	Tolna	Tamási	1,767	7086

== Notes ==
- Cities marked with * have several different post codes, the one here is only the most general one.
