= Bocfölde =

- Village
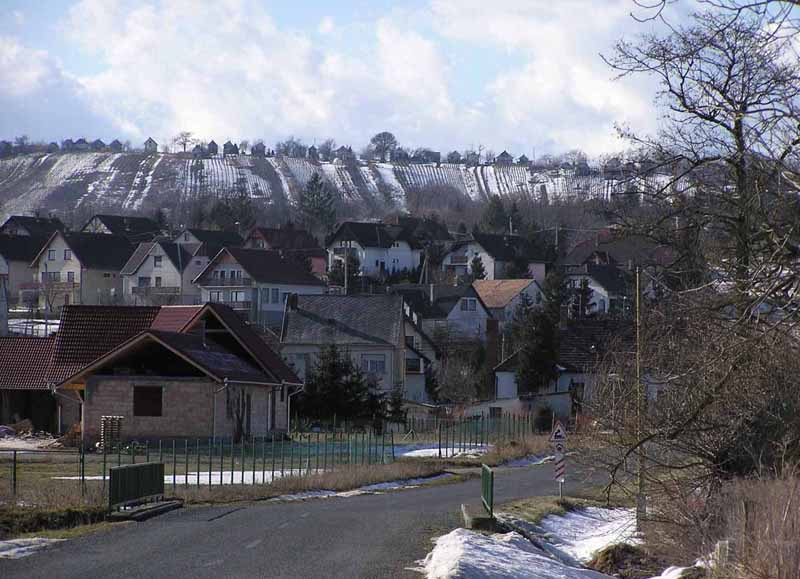

- Flag Coat of arms

- Location of Bocfölde
- Coordinates: 46.78137°N 16.84256°E
- Country: Hungary
- Region: Western Transdanubia
- County: Zala
- District: Zalaegerszeg

Area
  - Total: 8.73 km^{2} (3.37 sq mi)

Population (1 January 2025)
  - Total: 1,132
  - Density: 130/km^{2} (336/sq mi)
- Time zone: UTC+1 (CET)
  - Summer (DST): UTC+2 (CEST)
- Postal code: 8943
- Area code: (+36) 92
- Website: bocfolde.hu

Bocfölde is a village in Western Hungary. It has a growing commuter community that works in Zalaegerszeg, the county seat and regional industrial center that is located about 6 km (4 mi) to the North.

== Location, Geography ==
Bocfölde is settled on the left bank of the Válicka a small river originating in the Southwest of Zala County and merging into the Zala River. Zalaegerszeg is to the North, village of Csatár (1 km) is to the East, and Sárhida (2 km) is to the South. Roads crossing the hills of Bocfölde to the valley on the West could be safely ridden only by four-wheel drive vehicles. Older houses were built on the Zala Hills overlooking the Válicka Valley, whereas from the 1960s a new settlement developed in the Valley itself. Here, European route E65, a local road connecting to Zalaegerszeg-Sárhida-Bak, and the Zalaegerszeg-Rédics railway provide convenient access to the rest of the region.

Bocfölde is part of Göcsej, a geographic, historical, architectural, and ethnographic unit, that maintained elements of a unique agricultural culture until the 1950s and 1960s, when industrialization and modernization accelerated. Göcseji Falumúzeum, a reconstructed model village displaying original houses, agricultural buildings collected from the Göcsej region is nearby in Zalaegerszeg.

== History ==
Its first recorded name, in 1247, is "Possessio Buchfelden". Its stone church, mentioned in a 1426 document, was dedicated to Saint Margaret of Hungary. The church and the entire village were destroyed in the 17th century. Its decline started after the Ottoman army won a major battle against the Hungarians at Mohács in 1526. As the Ottoman troops used the Kanizsa-Sopron-Vienna road, which crossed the village, for several military campaigns, Bocfölde settlement was deserted. The village became completely exposed in 1571 when the Ottoman troops occupied the nearby defensive fort of Kanizsa, now Nagykanizsa. The village was resettled, away from the Kanizsa-Sopron road, in the relative protection of surrounding forested hills, after the end of Ottoman occupation in the late 17th century. By 1826 its population, made up by families of small land owners, grew to 413 residents of 56 households.

== Demographics ==
Ethnic composition: 86.7% Hungarian, 6.3% Roma, 8.3% unknown/no response (2001 Census).

Religious affiliations: 74% Roman Catholic, 1.1% Reformed Christian, 0.5% Evangelical, 6.9% no affiliations, 17.3% no response (2001 Census).

== Sites of interest ==
- ~500-year-old European Chestnut tree (Castanea sativa)
- ~110-year-old Small-leaved Lime tree (Tilia cordata)
- European or purple cyclamen (Cyclamen purpurascens) is common in the surrounding woods, depicted on the village's coat of arms
- Herds of Hungarian Grey Cattle and Murakoz horse
- Stone Cross from the 19th century.
- Roman Catholic Church built in 1943. It is unique that has only one steeple, as the builders run out of money.
- Monument for the fallen local soldiers of the 1848 Revolution, World War I, and World War II

(The later two are in the old center of the village, on the top of the main hill.)

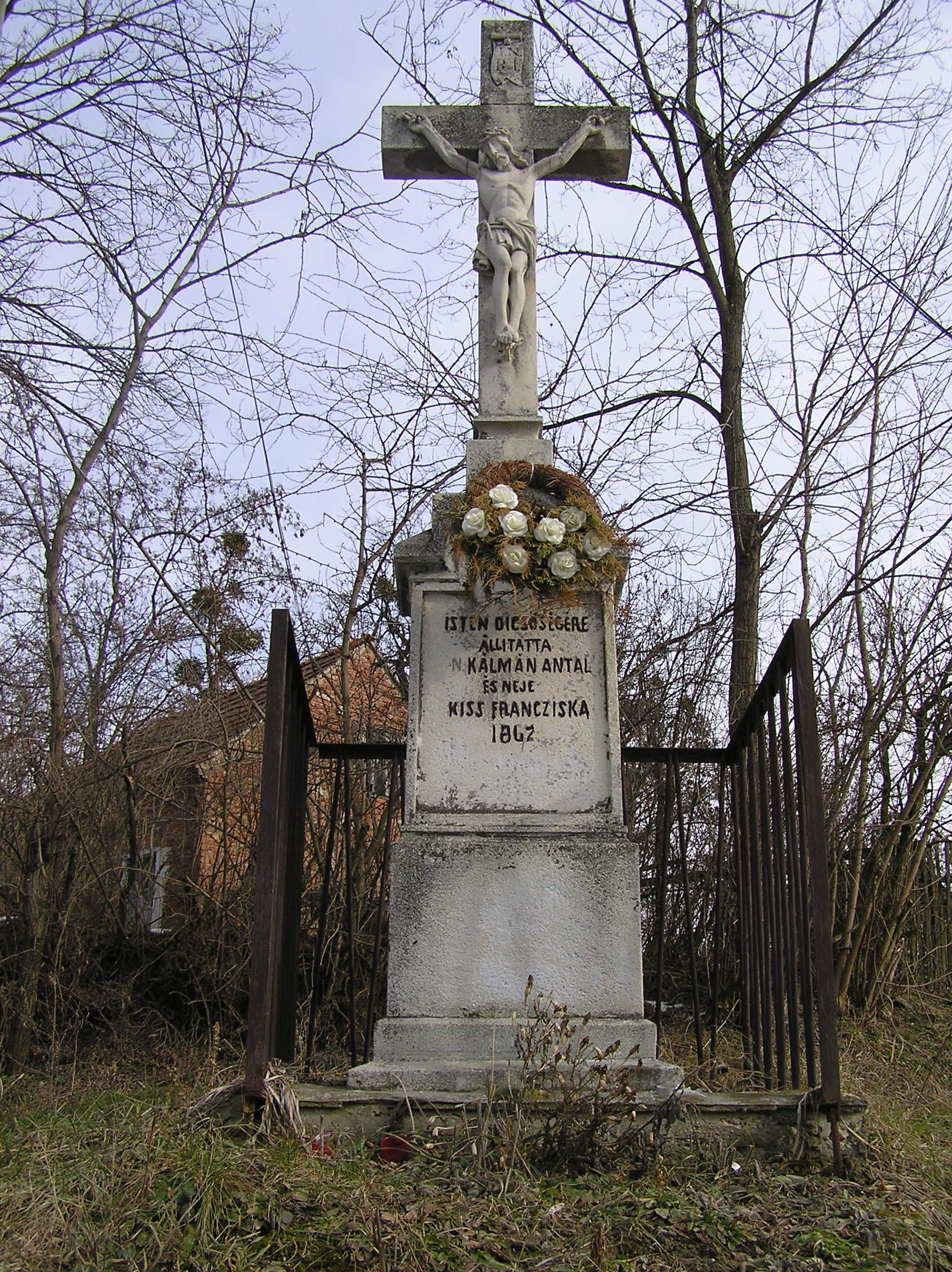
19th-century stone cross in Bocfölde

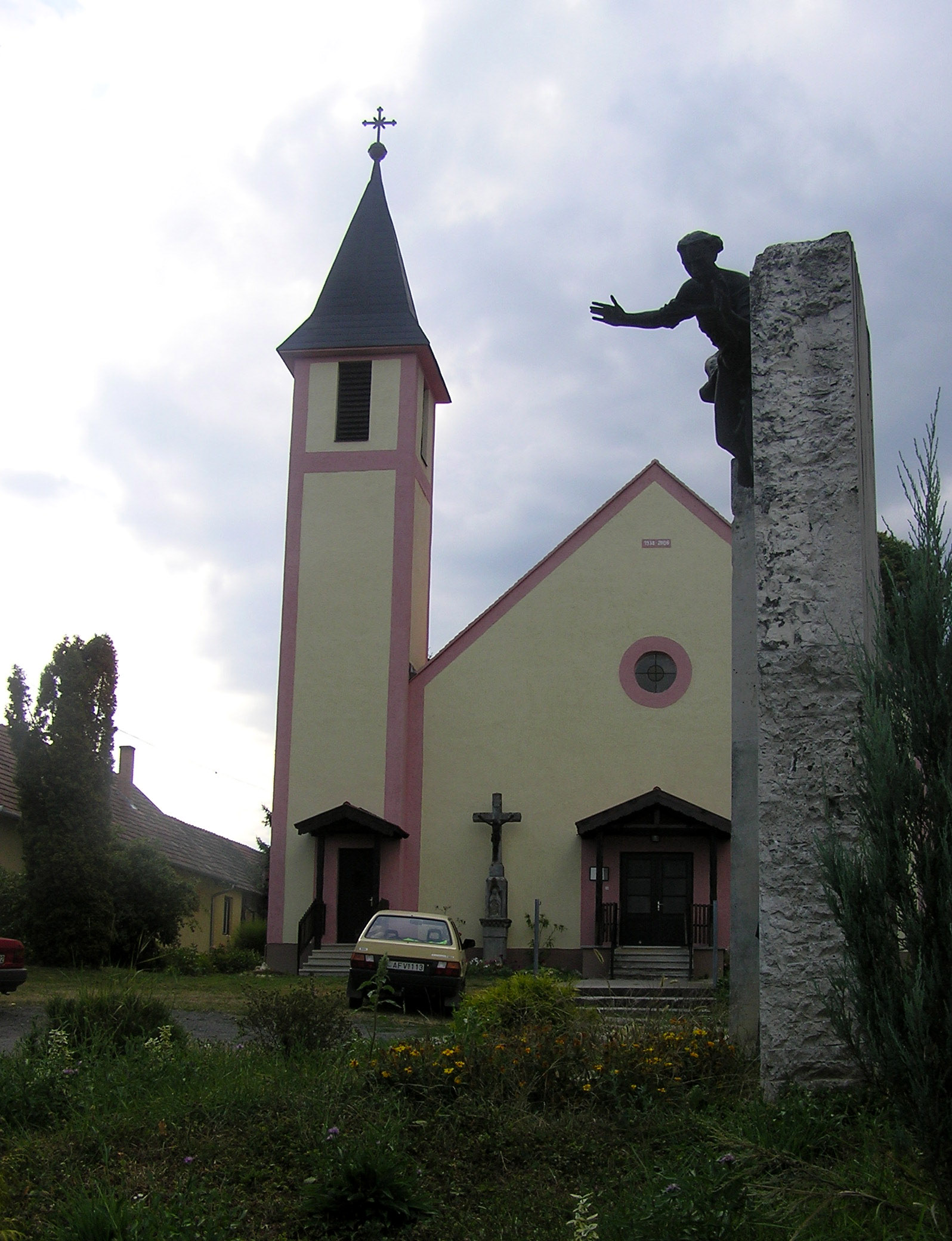
Roman Catholic church and monument for fallen local soldiers in Bocfölde
