= Sárvíz =

Sárvíz may refer to:

- Sárvíz (Sió) a river in Hungary
- Sárvíz (Zala) a stream in Hungary
