= Vöckönd =

- Village
- Flag Coat of arms

- Location of Vöckönd
- Coordinates: 46.889239°N 16.955081°E
- Country: Hungary
- Region: Western Transdanubia
- County: Zala
- District: Zalaegerszeg

Area
  - Total: 2.79 km^{2} (1.08 sq mi)

Population (1 January 2026)
  - Total: 100
  - Density: 36/km^{2} (93/sq mi)
- Time zone: UTC+1 (CET)
  - Summer (DST): UTC+2 (CEST)
- Postal code: 8931
- Area code: (+36) 92
- Website: www.vockond.hu

Vöckönd is a village in Zala County, Hungary.

== Location ==
Zalaegerszeg is 14 km northeast of Vöckönd.

== History ==
The area was first mentioned in charters in the 1450s. In the 1480s, there was at least some sort of settlement, perhaps with a church that no longer stands today as well.

The present village is built on a hill and had its church built in the early 1900s. The architecture of the village is said to be typical Hungarian style for the time period. A famous house in Szentendre Village became a museum and is known as the "Vöcköndi house."
