= Kispáli =

- Village
- Flag Coat of arms

- Location of Kispáli
- Coordinates: 46.90711°N 16.82798°E
- Country: Hungary
- Region: Western Transdanubia
- County: Zala
- District: Zalaegerszeg

Area
  - Total: 4.51 km^{2} (1.74 sq mi)

Population (1 January 2026)
  - Total: 273
  - Density: 60.5/km^{2} (157/sq mi)
- Time zone: UTC+1 (CET)
  - Summer (DST): UTC+2 (CEST)
- Postal code: 8912
- Area code: (+36) 92
- Website: kispali.eu

Kispáli is a village in Zala County, Hungary.
