= Szentpéterfölde =

- Village
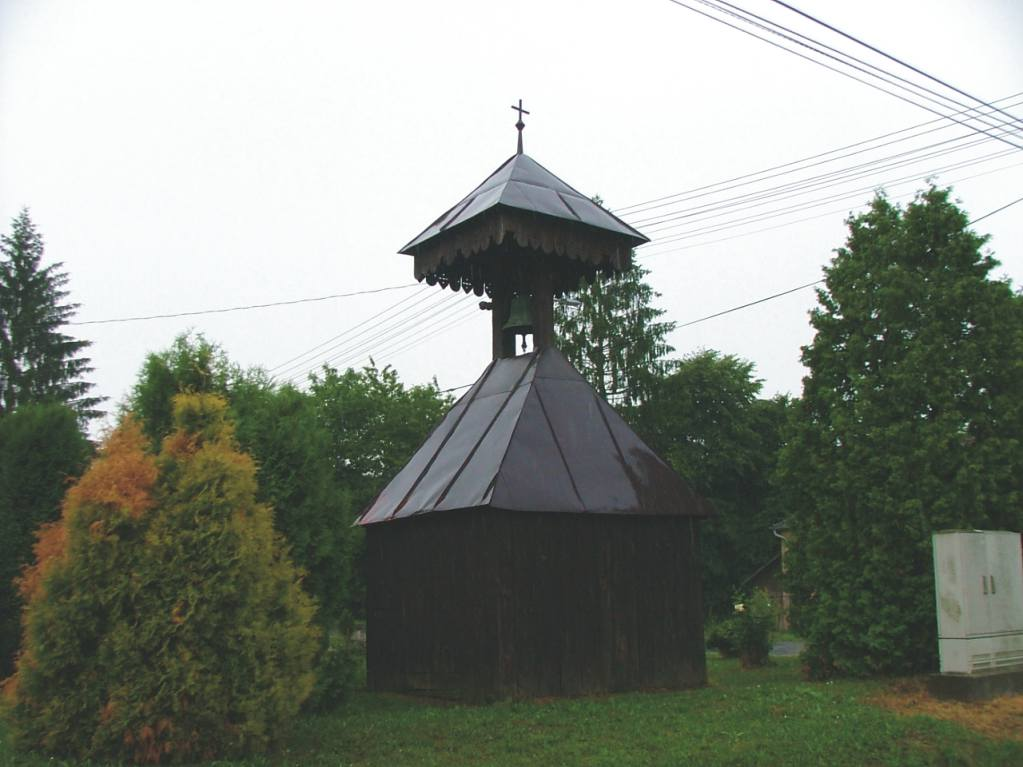

- Flag Coat of arms

- Location of Szentpéterfölde
- Coordinates: 46.616261°N 16.75735°E
- Country: Hungary
- Region: Western Transdanubia
- County: Zala
- District: Zalaegerszeg

Area
  - Total: 12.12 km^{2} (4.68 sq mi)

Population (1 January 2026)
  - Total: 113
  - Density: 9.32/km^{2} (24.1/sq mi)
- Time zone: UTC+1 (CET)
  - Summer (DST): UTC+2 (CEST)
- Postal code: 8953
- Area code: (+36) 92
- Website: szentpeterfolde.hu

Szentpéterfölde is a village in Zala County, Hungary.
