= Pókaszepetk =

- Village
- Flag Coat of arms

- Location of Pókaszepetk
- Coordinates: 46.9246°N 16.96821°E
- Country: Hungary
- Region: Western Transdanubia
- County: Zala
- District: Zalaegerszeg

Area
  - Total: 18.69 km^{2} (7.22 sq mi)

Population (1 January 2025)
  - Total: 883
  - Density: 47.2/km^{2} (122/sq mi)
- Time zone: UTC+1 (CET)
  - Summer (DST): UTC+2 (CEST)
- Postal code: 8932
- Area code: (+36) 92
- Website: www.pokaszepetk.hu

Pókaszepetk is a village in Zala County, Hungary.

The village known as Pokaszepetk was formed by the union of the two settlements of Pokafa and Zepetkh in 1943. The population is approximately 1000. The village lies on the left side of Zala River, 15 km (9 mi) from Zalaegerszeg. The village church is a monument with frescos and curved pews from the beginning of last century in the nave. There is a newly established bell cage greeting the visitors arriving from the direction of Zalaegerszeg. We can bow before the memorial tablet of Elemer Kelemen teacher at the wall of the school. There is an archery club operating in the village aimed at preserving local traditions. There is an annual (in August) "horse-riding day" where competitors can participate in show-jumping and the driving teams of horses. The village has its own horse-riding team, and national traditions are also reflected by handiwork and wood-carving clubs. The area is famous for apples and Pokaszepetk is part of the Zalaian Apple Route.
