= Gősfa =

- Village
- Flag Coat of arms

- Location of Gősfa
- Coordinates: 46.960481°N 16.860019°E
- Country: Hungary
- Region: Western Transdanubia
- County: Zala
- District: Zalaegerszeg

Area
  - Total: 10.45 km^{2} (4.03 sq mi)

Population (1 January 2025)
  - Total: 308
  - Density: 29.5/km^{2} (76.3/sq mi)
- Time zone: UTC+1 (CET)
  - Summer (DST): UTC+2 (CEST)
- Postal code: 8913
- Area code: (+36) 92
- Website: gosfa.koznet.hu

Gősfa is a village in Zala County, Hungary. The Sárvíz (Zala) stream passes through the village.
