= Vasboldogasszony =

- Village
- Flag Coat of arms

- Location of Vasboldogasszony
- Coordinates: 46.94087°N 16.87294°E
- Country: Hungary
- Region: Western Transdanubia
- County: Zala
- District: Zalaegerszeg

Area
  - Total: 11.75 km^{2} (4.54 sq mi)

Population (1 January 2026)
  - Total: 538
  - Density: 45.8/km^{2} (119/sq mi)
- Time zone: UTC+1 (CET)
  - Summer (DST): UTC+2 (CEST)
- Postal code: 8914
- Area code: (+36) 92
- Website: www.vasboldogasszony.koznet.hu

Vasboldogasszony is a village on the Sárvíz (Zala) stream in Zala County, Hungary.
