= Gutorfölde =

- Village
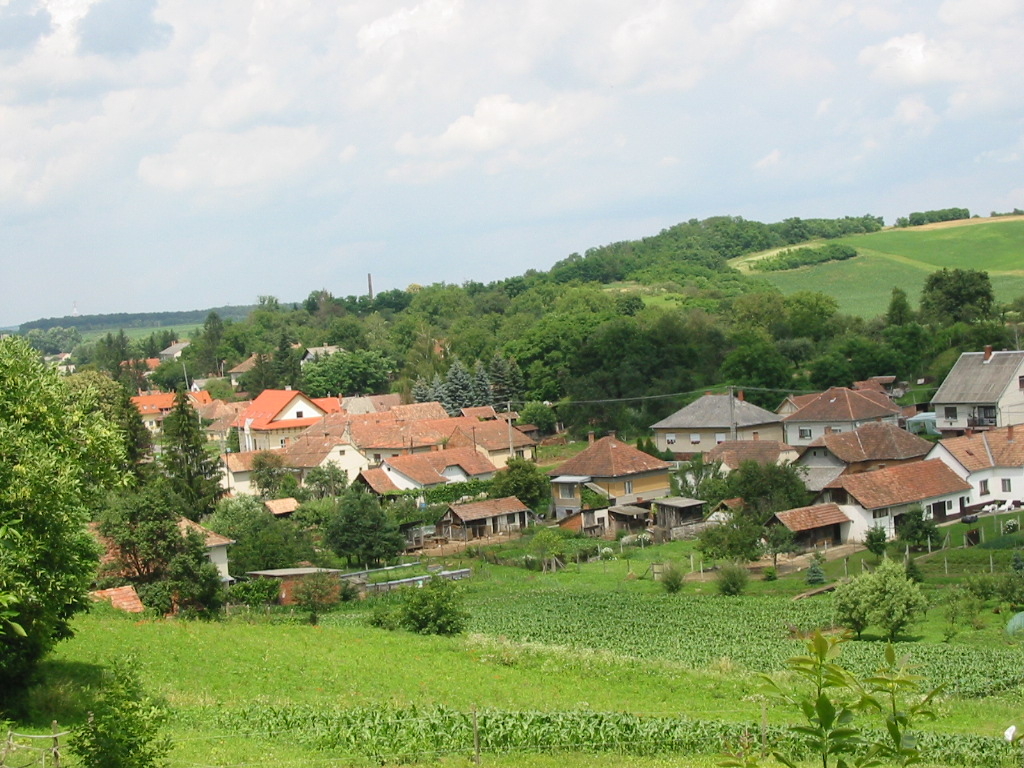

- Flag Coat of arms

- Location of Gutorfölde
- Coordinates: 46.642748°N 16.736684°E
- Country: Hungary
- Region: Western Transdanubia
- County: Zala
- District: Zalaegerszeg

Area
  - Total: 24.85 km^{2} (9.59 sq mi)

Population (1 January 2025)
  - Total: 849
  - Density: 34.2/km^{2} (88.5/sq mi)
- Time zone: UTC+1 (CET)
  - Summer (DST): UTC+2 (CEST)
- Postal code: 8951
- Area code: (+36) 92
- Website: www.gutorfolde.hu

Gutorfölde is a village in Zala County, Hungary.
