= Alibánfa =

- Village
- Location of Alibánfa
- Coordinates: 46.88973°N 16.91661°E
- Country: Hungary
- Region: Western Transdanubia
- County: Zala County
- District: Zalaegerszeg District

Area
  - Total: 225 sq mi (584 km^{2})

Population (2015)
  - Total: 394
  - Density: 1.75/sq mi (0.675/km^{2})
- Time zone: UTC+1 (CET)
  - Summer (DST): UTC+2 (CEST)
- Postal code: 8921
- Area code: (+36) 92

Alibánfa is a village in Zala county, Hungary.

== Location ==
It is located 11 kilometers northeast of Zalaegerszeg, along the Zala River. The settlement is surrounded by vineyards in the east and west. The Zalaszentiván Train Station is not far from the village. It has a bus connection to the county seat in Zalaegerszeg.

== History ==
Its first written mention was made in 1414, called "Possessio Olywanchfalwa". In the 16th century, the Turks repeatedly destroyed the village. By the end of the century, it had become uninhabited. On November 6, 1699, Hungarian King Leopold I donated an estate to Tóródy Mihály and his wife, Mihály Farkas, Ságodi Éva Péter. At the beginning of the 18th century Holy Roman Emperor Charles VI donated a landholding to the Boldogfai Farkas family in 1716 and gradually re-established the village.

In 1871 it was united with the originally independent port of Lukafa. From the 1950s, a significant portion of Alibaanfa's population was working in Zalaegerszeg, but Zalaszentiván holds most of the administrative and educational institutions.
