= Salomvár =

- Village
- Flag Coat of arms

- Location of Salomvár
- Coordinates: 46.84997°N 16.66096°E
- Country: Hungary
- Region: Western Transdanubia
- County: Zala
- District: Zalaegerszeg

Area
  - Total: 16.11 km^{2} (6.22 sq mi)

Population (1 January 2025)
  - Total: 560
  - Density: 35/km^{2} (90/sq mi)
- Time zone: UTC+1 (CET)
  - Summer (DST): UTC+2 (CEST)
- Postal code: 8995
- Area code: (+36) 92
- Website: www.salomvar.hu

Salomvár is a village in Zala County, Hungary.
