= Kemendollár =

- Village
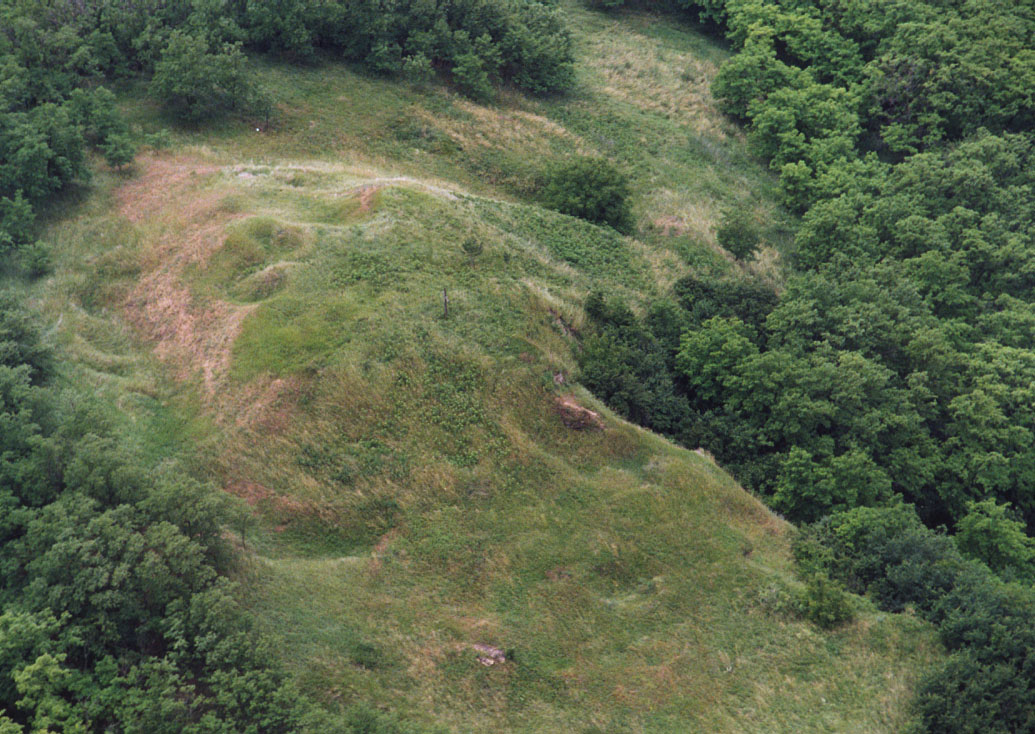
- Aerial photography: Kemendollár, castle of Kemen

- Flag Coat of arms

- Location of Kemendollár
- Coordinates: 46.90487°N 16.94554°E
- Country: Hungary
- Region: Western Transdanubia
- County: Zala
- District: Zalaegerszeg

Area
  - Total: 16.07 km^{2} (6.20 sq mi)

Population (1 January 2026)
  - Total: 450
  - Density: 28/km^{2} (73/sq mi)
- Time zone: UTC+1 (CET)
  - Summer (DST): UTC+2 (CEST)
- Postal code: 8931
- Area code: (+36) 92
- Website: kemendollar.hu

Kemendollár is a village in Zala County, Hungary.
