= Egervár =

- Village
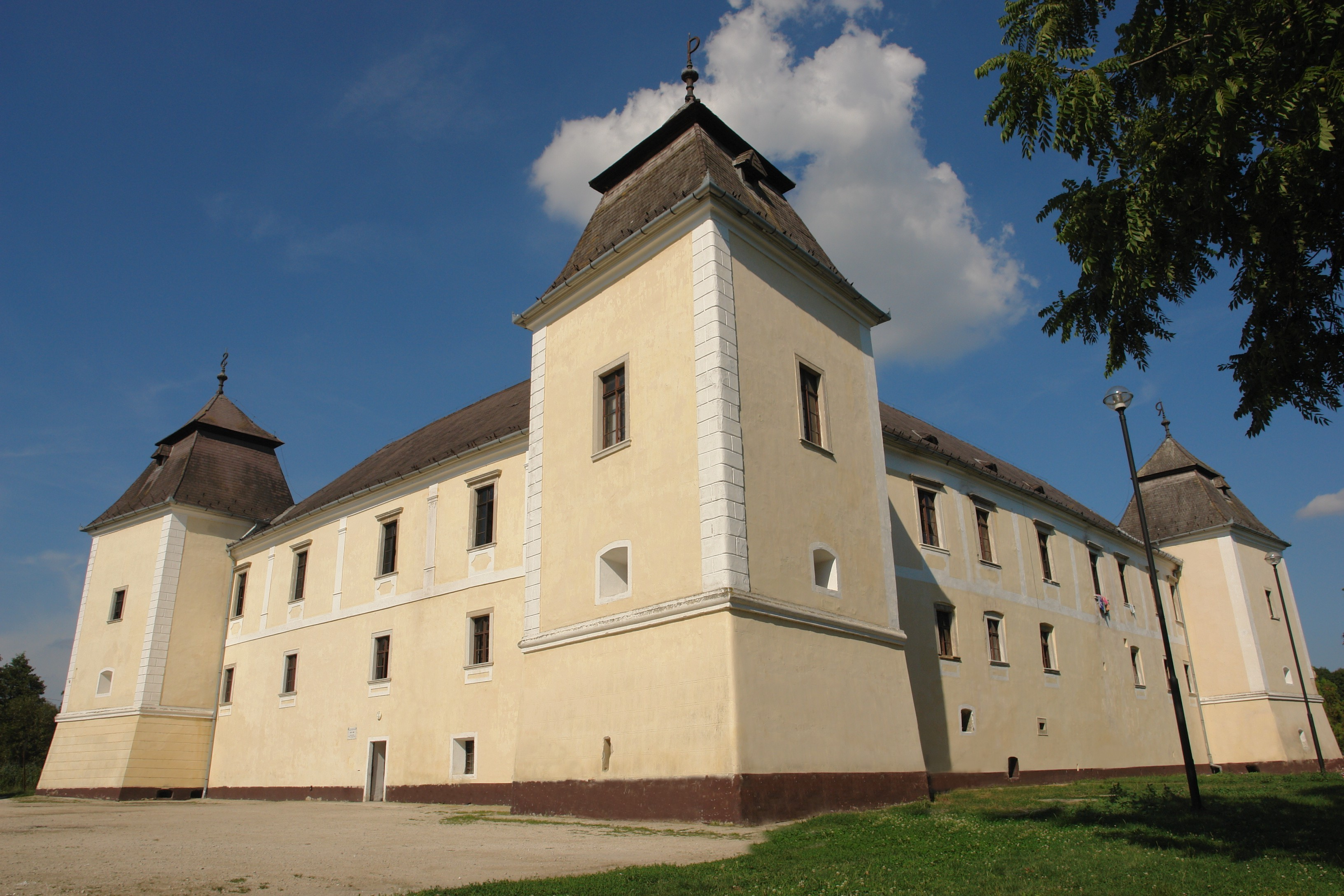
- The castle of Egervár

- Flag Coat of arms

- Location of Egervár
- Coordinates: 46.93552°N 16.85365°E
- Country: Hungary
- Region: Western Transdanubia
- County: Zala
- District: Zalaegerszeg

Area
  - Total: 10.29 km^{2} (3.97 sq mi)

Population (1 January 2025)
  - Total: 1,054
  - Density: 102.4/km^{2} (265.3/sq mi)
- Time zone: UTC+1 (CET)
  - Summer (DST): UTC+2 (CEST)
- Postal code: 8913
- Area code: (+36) 92
- Website: egervar.hu

Egervár is a village on the Sárvíz (Zala) stream in Zala County, in south-western Hungary.
