= Nagykutas =

- Village
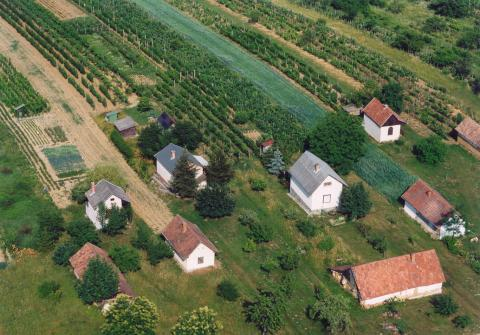
- Aerial photography of Nagykutas

- Flag Coat of arms

- Location of Nagykutas
- Coordinates: 46.92715°N 16.80549°E
- Country: Hungary
- Region: Western Transdanubia
- County: Zala
- District: Zalaegerszeg

Area
  - Total: 8.45 km^{2} (3.26 sq mi)

Population (1 January 2025)
  - Total: 442
  - Density: 52.3/km^{2} (135/sq mi)
- Time zone: UTC+1 (CET)
  - Summer (DST): UTC+2 (CEST)
- Postal code: 8911
- Area code: (+36) 92
- Website: www.nagykutas.hu

Nagykutas is a village in Zala County, Hungary.
