= Nemessándorháza =

- Village
- Flag Coat of arms

- Location of Nemessándorháza
- Coordinates: 46.78446°N 16.95015°E
- Country: Hungary
- Region: Western Transdanubia
- County: Zala
- District: Zalaegerszeg

Area
  - Total: 11.16 km^{2} (4.31 sq mi)

Population (1 January 2025)
  - Total: 305
  - Density: 27.3/km^{2} (70.8/sq mi)
- Time zone: UTC+1 (CET)
  - Summer (DST): UTC+2 (CEST)
- Postal code: 8925
- Area code: (+36) 92
- Website: nemessandorhaza.hu

Nemessándorháza is a village in Zala County, Hungary.
