= Gellénháza Power Plant =

Proposed power plant in Hungary

- Country: Hungary
- Location: Gellénháza, Zala County
- Coordinates: 46°45′10″N 16°47′49″E
- Status: Under construction
- Commission date: 2008

Thermal power station
- Primary fuel: Biomass

Power generation
- Nameplate capacity: 142 MW

The Gellénháza Power Plant will be one of Hungary's largest biomass power plants having an installed electric capacity of 142 MW.
