= Hegyhátszentpéter =

- Location of Vas county in Hungary

- Location of Hegyhátszentpéter
- Coordinates: 46.98259°N 16.81459°E
- Country: Hungary
- County: Vas

Area
  - Total: 6.84 km^{2} (2.64 sq mi)

Population (2004)
  - Total: 181
  - Density: 26.46/km^{2} (68.5/sq mi)
- Time zone: UTC+1 (CET)
  - Summer (DST): UTC+2 (CEST)
- Postal code: 9826
- Area code: 94

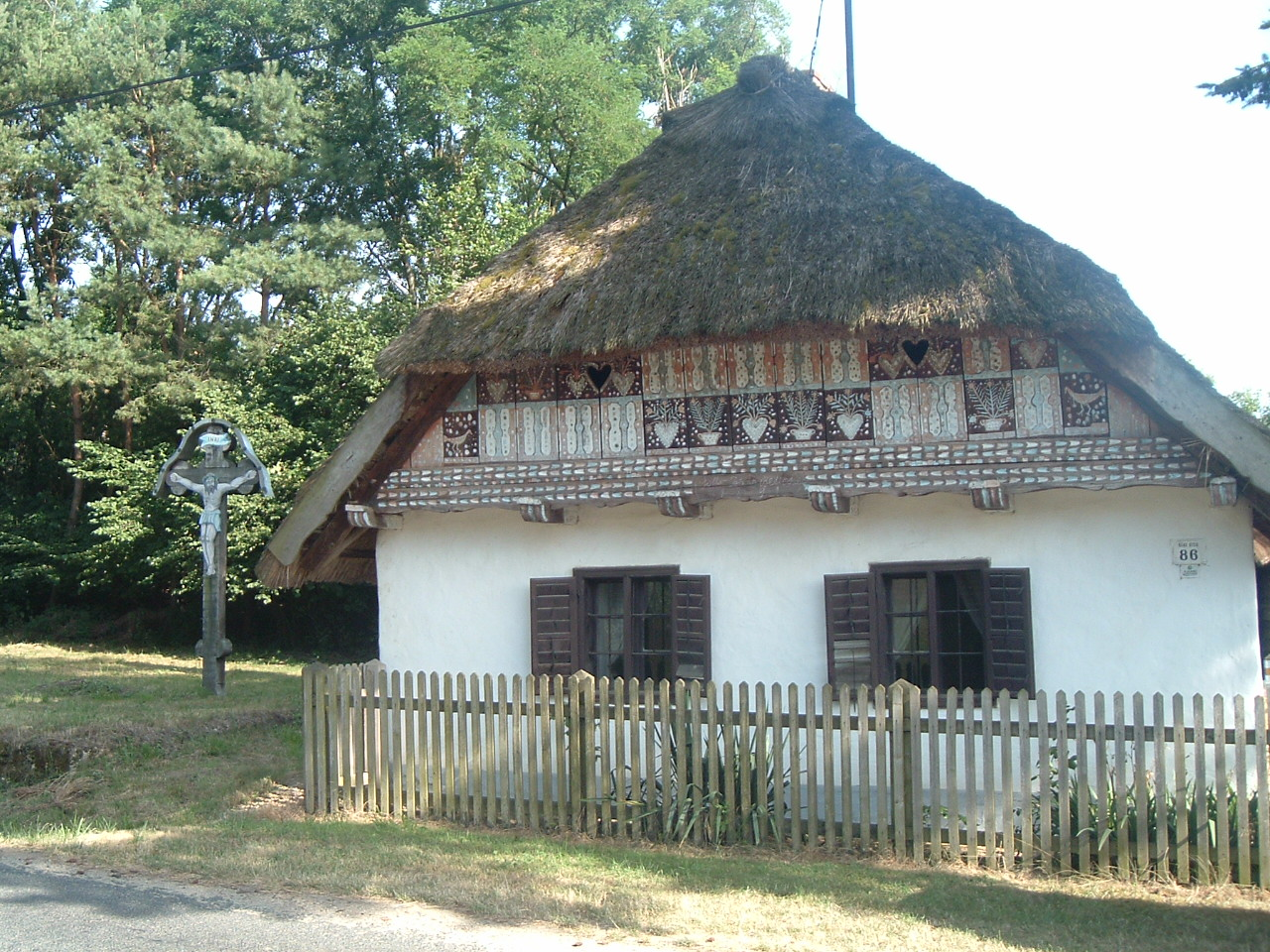
Village museum in Hegyhátszentpéter

Hegyhátszentpéter is a village in Vas county, Hungary. The Sárvíz stream, which is a left-bank tributary of the Zala river, originates here.
