= Vanessa Axente =

Hungarian fashion model (born 1995)

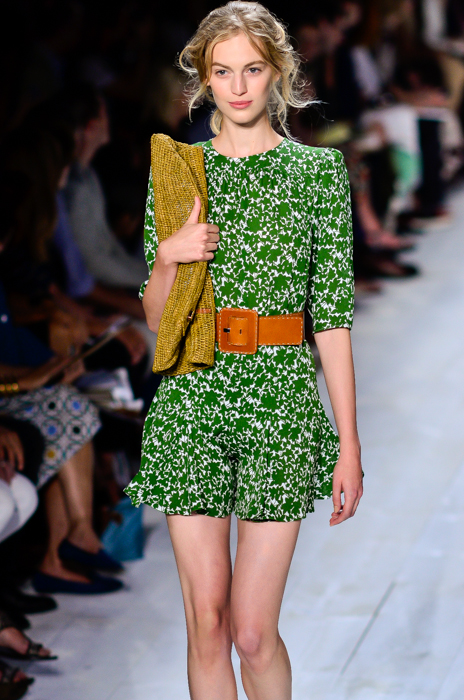
- Axente at New York Fashion Week in September 2013.
- Born: 19 November 1995 (age 30); Nagylengyel, Hungary
- Occupation: Fashion model
- Spouse: Rahil Gupta (m. 2020)
- Modeling information
- Height: 1.85 m (6 ft 1 in)
- Hair color: Blond
- Eye color: Blue
- Agency: Mother Agency: Attractive Models DNA Model Management (New York); VIVA Model Management (Paris, London, Barcelona); Why Not Model Management (Milan); AVE. Management (Singapore); Donna Models (Tokyo)

Vanessa Axente (born 19 November 1995) is a Hungarian fashion model.

== Early life ==
Vanessa Axente was born on 19 November 1995 in Nagylengyel, Hungary. Her older sister, Benedetta, a model, was the one who convinced her to visit her agency in Budapest, and start modeling. She worked extensively in Hungary, Singapore and Japan from the age of 14, until she turned 16 and decided to break into the European fashion market.

== Career ==
Axente started her career with the agency Attractive Models in 2009 and then signed with VIVA Model Management Paris in November 2011 and in January 2012, with DNA Model Management in New York.

=== 2012 ===
In February 2012, Axente opened the Fall 2012 Prada show in Milan as an exclusive, kickstarting her career. In Paris, she walked shows such as: Dries van Noten, Givenchy, Christian Dior S.A., Nina Ricci, Louis Vuitton, and Miu Miu. Axente opened the Céline and Valentino shows that same season.

That same year she was featured in the Fall 2012 Prada campaign alongside industry heavyweights Magdalena Frackowiak, Iselin Steiro and Anne Vyalitsyna. She was promptly booked on an exclusive with world-renowned photographer, Steven Meisel. She appeared on the cover of Vogue Italia July 2012, an editorial in Vogue Italia August 2012, and the cover once again in December 2012 all shot by Meisel.

Axente was featured on the cover of Vogue Italia again for the March 2013 issue alongside male model, Gustav Swedberg, shot once more by Steven Meisel. She was featured once again in the January 2014 issue of Vogue Italia.

=== 2013 ===
During the Spring 2013 fashion week in New York, she walked shows such as Alexander Wang, Calvin Klein, Tommy Hilfiger, opened the Donna Karan show, and closed the Proenza Schouler and Victoria Beckham shows. She was booked as a city exclusive for Giles in London. In Milan, Axente was booked exclusively for Prada once more, but continued to walk the shows in Paris the next week, including opening the Alexander McQueen fashion show.

That same year she was featured in the Spring 2013 Prada campaign alongside industry icons Amber Valletta, Eva Herzigova, Sasha Pivovarova, Raquel Zimmermann and Saskia de Brauw.

She appeared on the cover of Vogue Japan February 2013 shot by Patrick Demarchelier.

For the Fall 2013 season, Axente was a semi-exclusive for the Alexander Wang show, opened the Marc by Marc Jacobs show, and closed the Narciso Rodriguez show, in New York. She was booked as a city exclusive for Tom Ford in London, and for unknown reasons skipped Milan fashion week entirely. She continued on to Paris where she was a semi-exclusive for Balenciaga and closed the Alexander McQueen and Miu Miu shows.

That same year she was featured in the Fall 2013 Calvin Klein campaign as an only girl, which was photographed by Mert and Marcus.

=== 2014–present ===
For the Spring 2014 season, Axente was once again a semi-exclusive model for the Alexander Wang show, opened the Tommy Hilfiger and Donna Karan shows, and closed the Marc by Marc Jacobs show in New York. She then skipped London fashion week entirely. In Milan, she went on to walk for Prada again, and made her runway debut for Versace, Gucci, Fendi and Jil Sander. She then continued on to Paris where she opened the Sacai show.

She appeared on the cover of Vogue Germany for the first time in October 2013, which was shot by Luigi & Daniele + Iango.

For Spring 2014, she again landed the Calvin Klein campaign photographed by Mert & Marcus, Calvin Klein Jeans by Mario Sorrenti, and the Calvin Klein Endless Euphoria fragrance by Steven Meisel.

For the Fall 2014 season, Axente was an exclusive model for the Calvin Klein Collection show in New York and opened the H&M show in Paris.

She was featured on the cover of Vogue Japan for the second time in May 2014, which was shot by Willy Vanderperre.

In the same year, she was also featured in the Fall 2014 Calvin Klein campaign (her third in a row), which was photographed by David Sims.

She was featured on the cover of Vogue Germany in September 2014 shot by Daniel Jackson. She also appeared on the American Vogue September issue cover, which was shot by Mario Testino.

In 2014, she was ranked as a top model in the Models.com Top 50 Models list. She has been featured on 8 different Vogue covers as of September 2014.
