= Zalaszentgyörgy =

- Village
- Flag Coat of arms

- Location of Zalaszentgyörgy
- Coordinates: 46.872222°N 16.704167°E
- Country: Hungary
- Region: Western Transdanubia
- County: Zala
- District: Zalaegerszeg

Area
  - Total: 9.83 km^{2} (3.80 sq mi)

Population (1 January 2026)
  - Total: 395
  - Density: 40.2/km^{2} (104/sq mi)
- Time zone: UTC+1 (CET)
  - Summer (DST): UTC+2 (CEST)
- Postal code: 8994
- Area code: (+36) 92
- Website: zalaszentgyorgy.hu

Zalaszentgyörgy is a village in Zala County, Hungary.
