= Vaspör =

- Village
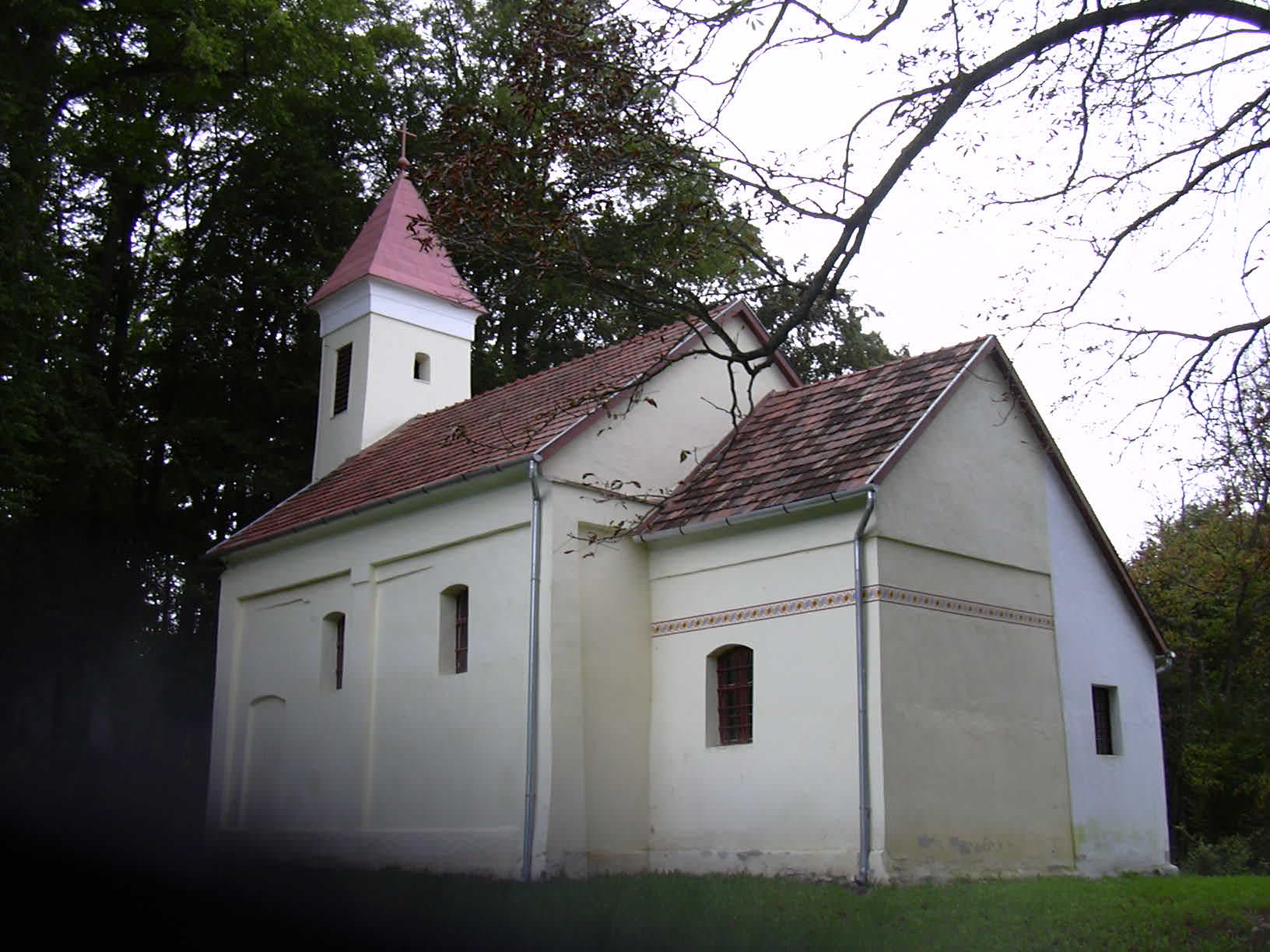

- Flag Coat of arms

- Location of Vaspör
- Coordinates: 46.918039°N 16.647869°E
- Country: Hungary
- Region: Western Transdanubia
- County: Zala
- District: Zalaegerszeg

Area
  - Total: 13.45 km^{2} (5.19 sq mi)

Population (1 January 2026)
  - Total: 364
  - Density: 27.1/km^{2} (70.1/sq mi)
- Time zone: UTC+1 (CET)
  - Summer (DST): UTC+2 (CEST)
- Postal code: 8998
- Area code: (+36) 92
- Website: vaspor.hu

Vaspör is a village in Zala County, Hungary. Its Birch House Tour includes one hectare garden.
