= Oszkó =

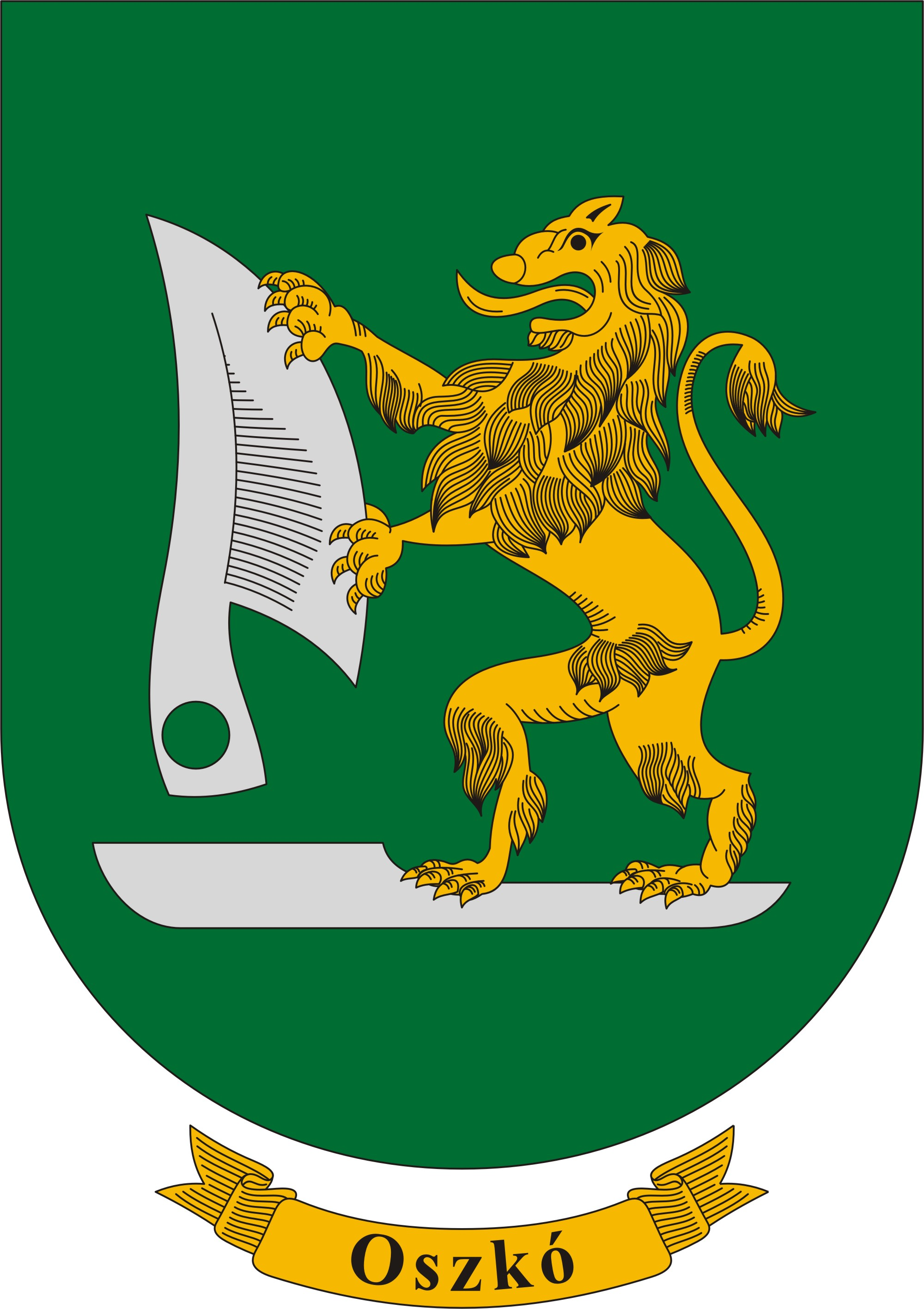
- Coat of arms

- Location of Oszkó in Hungary
- Coordinates: 47.04653°N 16.87405°E
- Country: Hungary
- Region: Western Transdanubia
- County: Vas
- Subregion: Vasvári
- Rank: Village

Area
  - Total: 20.31 km^{2} (7.84 sq mi)

Population (1 January 2008)
  - Total: 652
  - Density: 32.1/km^{2} (83.1/sq mi)
- Time zone: UTC+1 (CET)
  - Summer (DST): UTC+2 (CEST)
- Postal code: 9825
- Area code: +36 94
- KSH code: 07667
- Website: http://www.oszko.hu/

Oszkó is a village in Vas county, Hungary.
