= Gellénháza =

- Village
- Flag Coat of arms

- Location of Gellénháza
- Coordinates: 46.769298°N 16.786222°E
- Country: Hungary
- Region: Western Transdanubia
- County: Zala
- District: Zalaegerszeg

Area
  - Total: 5.24 km^{2} (2.02 sq mi)

Population (1 January 2025)
  - Total: 1,469
  - Density: 280/km^{2} (726/sq mi)
- Time zone: UTC+1 (CET)
  - Summer (DST): UTC+2 (CEST)
- Postal code: 8981
- Area code: (+36) 92
- Website: gellenhaza.hu

Gellénháza is a village in Zala County, Hungary.

== See also ==
- Gellénháza Power Plant
