= Tófej =

Coordinates: 46°40′N 16°48′E

- Village
- Interactive map of Tófej
- Country: Hungary
- Region: Western Transdanubia
- County: Zala County
- District: Zalaegerszeg District

Government
  - Mayor: Zoltán Horváth (Fidesz-KDNP)

Area
  - Total: 15.32 km^{2} (5.92 sq mi)

Population (2023)
  - Total: 640
  - Density: 46.67/km^{2} (120.9/sq mi)
- Time zone: UTC+1 (CET)
  - Summer (DST): UTC+2 (CEST)
- Postal code: 8946
- Area code: (+36) 92
- Website: www.tofej.hu

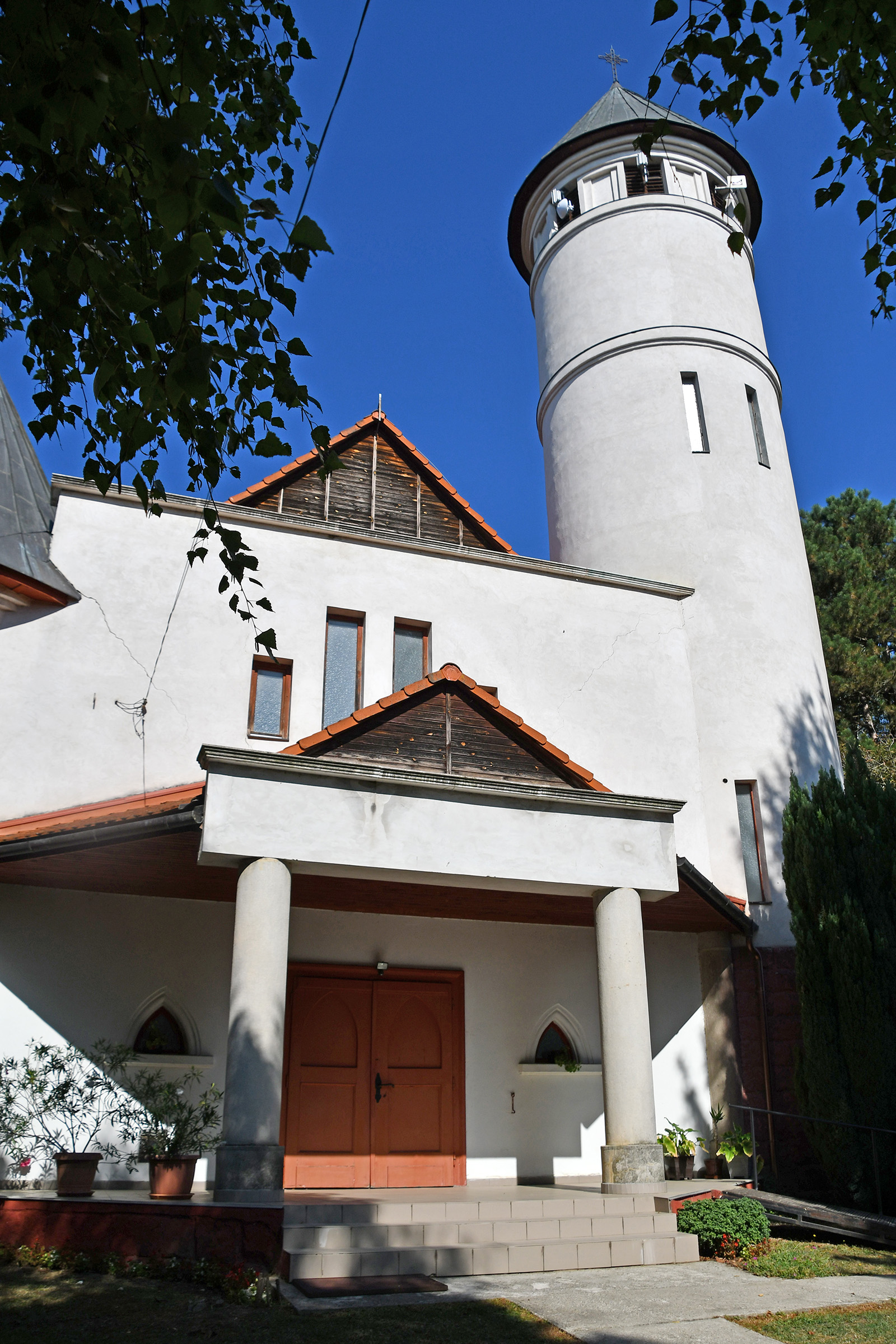
Roman Catholic church in Lórántháza, Tófej, Zala, Hungary

Tófej is a village in Zala County, Hungary.
