= Csöde =

Village in Zala County, Hungary

- Village
- Flag Coat of arms

- Location of Csöde
- Coordinates: 46.816°N 16.5311°E
- Country: Hungary
- Region: Western Transdanubia
- County: Zala
- District: Zalaegerszeg

Area
  - Total: 10.61 km^{2} (4.10 sq mi)

Population (1 January 2025)
  - Total: 71
  - Density: 6.7/km^{2} (17/sq mi)
- Time zone: UTC+1 (CET)
  - Summer (DST): UTC+2 (CEST)
- Postal code: 8999
- Area code: (+36) 92
- Website: csode.hu

Csöde is a village in Zala County, Hungary.

== History ==
The settlement was first mentioned in 1342 from Chedi in shape. Until the 19th century it was a "fold" settlement, inhabited by serfs. The 20th century was characterized by a high rate of emigration, which has led to an aging population. One part of its settlement (Pusztaszentpéter) is now extinct. In the area of today's village, to the west of Alsócsöde, was the village of Szentmárton. Traces of the church, which was destroyed in the early 1600s and of the Pauline monastery here, are still visible today and are marked by a plaque.

According to Schematism of 1852, the denominational distribution of Csöde was as follows: 93 Reformed, 62 Catholic. The village also included two completely deserted settlements. At that time there were 18 Catholics and 12 Reformed people in Pácod, and 11 Catholics lived in Szentmárton Major.

However, after the construction of the Zalalövő - Őrihodos railway line in the 2000s, more and more tourists are coming to the village, whose economy is booming.
