= Csempeszkopács =

- Location of Vas county in Hungary

- Location of Csempeszkopács
- Coordinates: 47.15562°N 16.80891°E
- Country: Hungary
- County: Vas

Area
  - Total: 5.4 km^{2} (2.1 sq mi)

Population (2015)
  - Total: 283
  - Density: 52.41/km^{2} (135.7/sq mi)
- Time zone: UTC+1 (CET)
  - Summer (DST): UTC+2 (CEST)
- Postal code: 9764
- Area code: 94

Csempeszkopács is a village in Vas County, Hungary.

== History ==
The village was created by uniting two villages, Csempeszháza and Kopács, in the 19th century. In 1910 the village had 313 inhabitants.

== The Árpád Age Church ==
- The most important architectural heritage of the village is the Árpád Age church. It was the church of the Kopács part of the village. It was dedicated to Saint Michael archangel. This 13th-century romanesque style church stands on a little hill. Inside details of the medieval murals can be seen. Later the church was renewed in the barock style. The main altar's painting was painted by Stephan Dorfmeister.
- In the Csempesz part of the village, there is a castle of late renaissance of Balog-family. elynek It has been built in the late 16th century, later renewed in barock style. It also contains the local history museum.
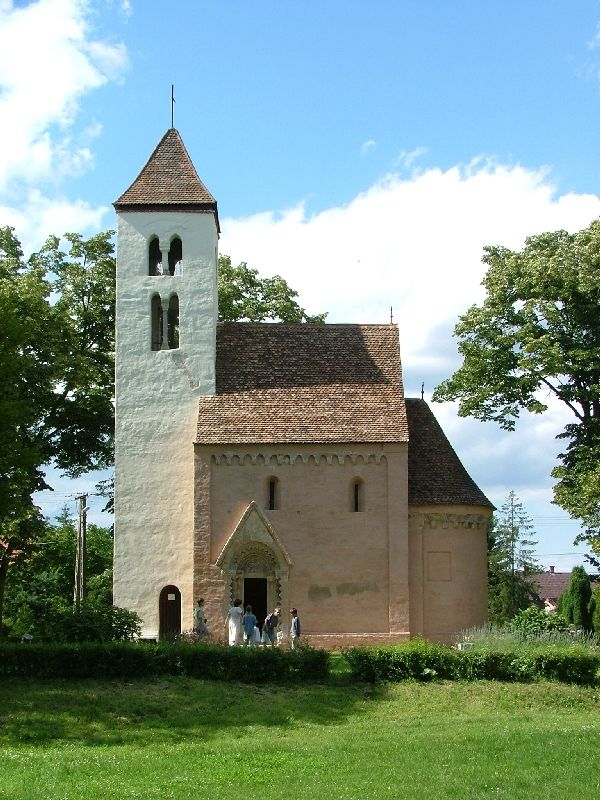
The Roman Catholic Church of Csempeszkopács, built in the 13th century: southern view.

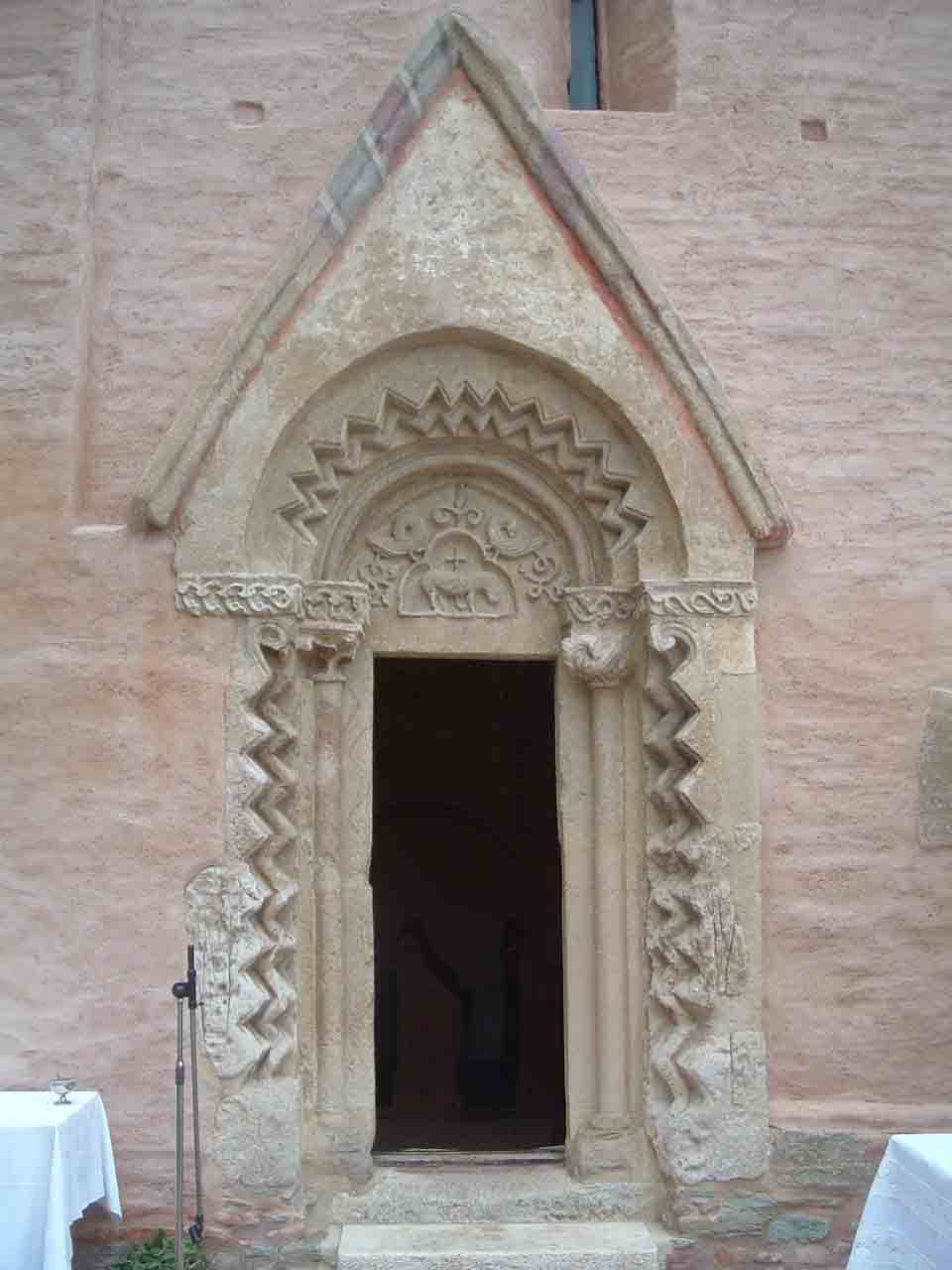
The southern doorway of Roman Catholic Church of Csempeszkopács.
