= Németfalu =

- Location of Németfalu
- Coordinates: 46.81615°N 16.68585°E
- Country: Hungary
- County: Zala

Area
  - Total: 8.66 km^{2} (3.34 sq mi)

Population (2001)
  - Total: 214
  - Density: 24.7/km^{2} (64.0/sq mi)
- Time zone: UTC+1 (CET)
  - Summer (DST): UTC+2 (CEST)
- Postal code: 8918

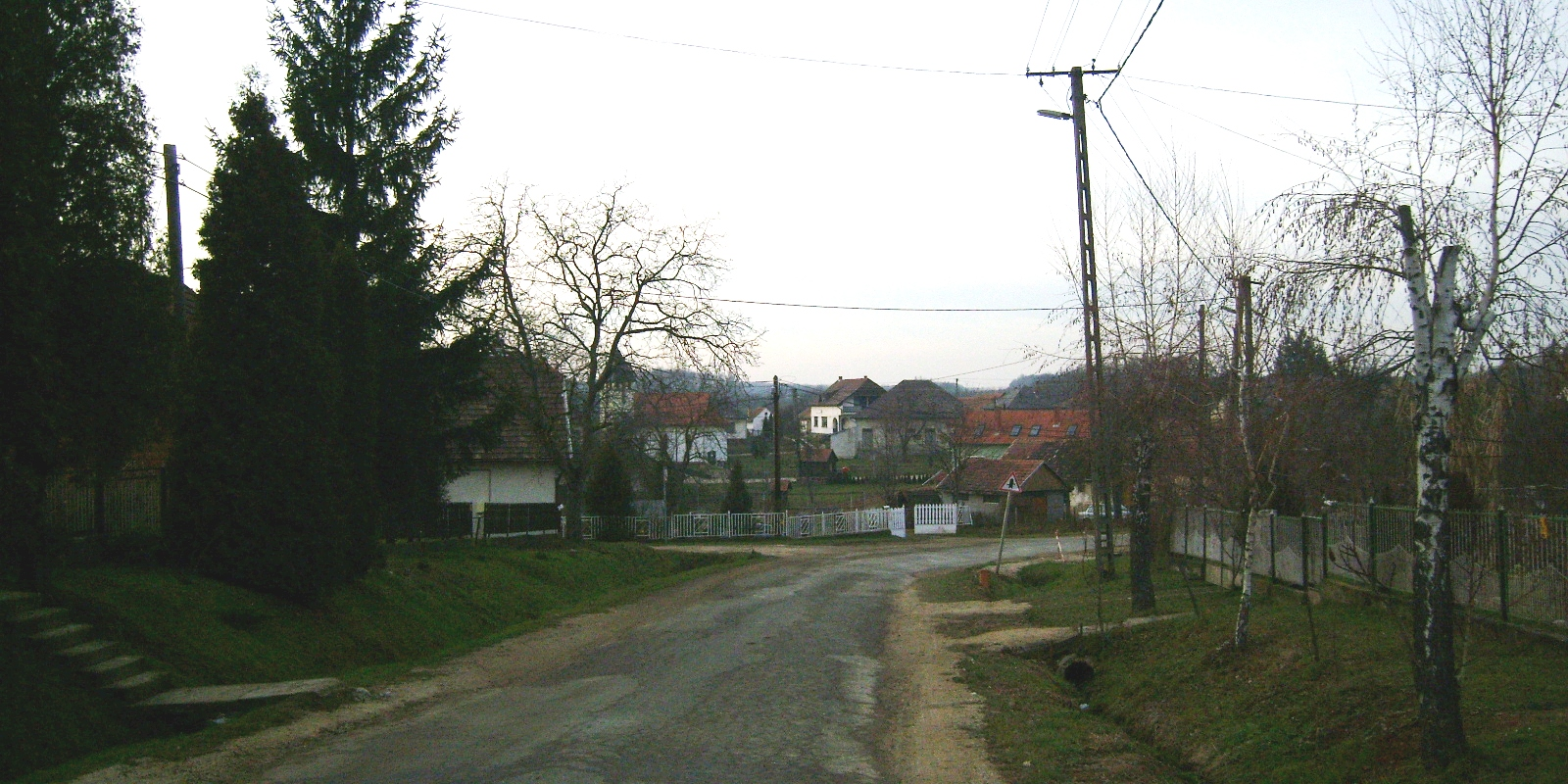
Németvalu street

Németfalu is a village in Zala County, Hungary. It lies about 15 km west of Zalaegerszeg. The lake of Kustánszeg offers a good view on the village.

== History ==
The village is first mentioned in 1266, the name refers to German settlers.
