= Szentkozmadombja =

- Village
- Flag Coat of arms

- Location of Szentkozmadombja
- Coordinates: 46.6833°N 16.7667°E
- Country: Hungary
- Region: Western Transdanubia
- County: Zala
- District: Zalaegerszeg

Area
  - Total: 5.08 km^{2} (1.96 sq mi)

Population (1 January 2026)
  - Total: 79
  - Density: 16/km^{2} (40/sq mi)
- Time zone: UTC+1 (CET)
  - Summer (DST): UTC+2 (CEST)
- Postal code: 8947
- Area code: (+36) 96

Szentkozmadombja is a village in Zala County, Hungary.
