= Becsvölgye =

- Village
- Flag Coat of arms

- Location of Becsvölgye
- Coordinates: 46.75876°N 16.68102°E
- Country: Hungary
- Region: Western Transdanubia
- County: Zala
- District: Zalaegerszeg

Area
  - Total: 21.4 km^{2} (8.3 sq mi)

Population (1 January 2025)
  - Total: 681
  - Density: 31.8/km^{2} (82.4/sq mi)
- Time zone: UTC+1 (CET)
  - Summer (DST): UTC+2 (CEST)
- Postal code: 8985
- Area code: (+36) 92
- Website: becsvolgye.hu

Becsvölgye is a village in Zala County, Hungary.
