= Orosztony =

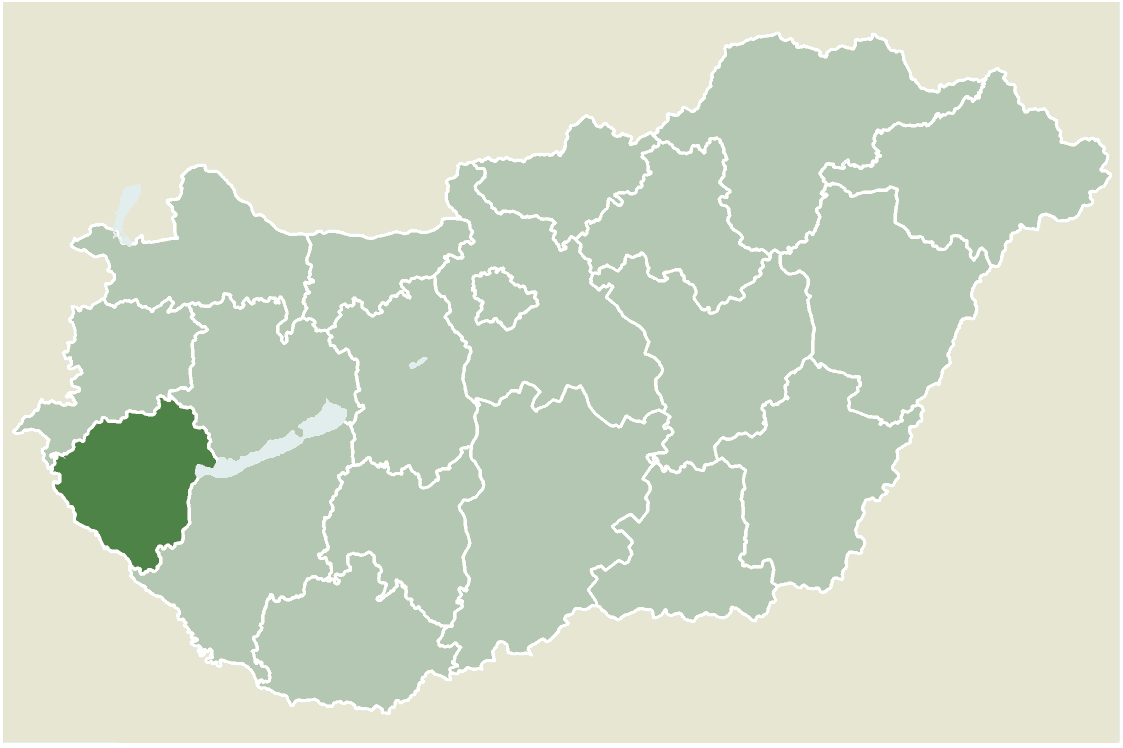
- Location of Zala county in Hungary

- Location of Orosztony
- Coordinates: 46.62529°N 17.06177°E
- Country: Hungary
- County: Zala

Area
  - Total: 18.45 km^{2} (7.12 sq mi)

Population (2004)
  - Total: 449
  - Density: 24.33/km^{2} (63.0/sq mi)
- Time zone: UTC+1 (CET)
  - Summer (DST): UTC+2 (CEST)
- Postal code: 8744
- Area code: 93

Orosztony is a village in Zala County, in western Hungary.
