= Zalaszentlőrinc =

Coordinates: 46°55′N 16°53′E

- Village
- Interactive map of Zalaszentlőrinc
- Country: Hungary
- Region: Western Transdanubia
- County: Zala County
- Time zone: UTC+1 (CET)
  - Summer (DST): UTC+2 (CEST)

Zalaszentlőrinc is a village in Zala County, Hungary. The Sárvíz passes the village shortly before flowing into the Zala river.
