= Sárvíz (Zala) =

Location
- Country: Hungary

Physical characteristics
- Mouth: Zala
  - coordinates: 46°53′04″N 16°53′56″E
- Length: 70 km (43 mi)

Basin features
- Progression: Zala→ Lake Balaton→ Sió→ Danube→ Black Sea

The Sárvíz is a stream in Vas and Zala counties, Hungary. It springs at Hegyhátszentpéter, then flows through Gősfa, Egervár and Vasboldogasszony. This stream is the border of the latter two villages. Later it passes Zalaszentlőrinc and Zalaszentiván, then flows into the Zala river from the left bank.
