= Nagylengyel =

- Village
- Flag Coat of arms

- Location of Nagylengyel
- Coordinates: 46.779411°N 16.768969°E
- Country: Hungary
- Region: Western Transdanubia
- County: Zala
- District: Zalaegerszeg

Area
  - Total: 10.24 km^{2} (3.95 sq mi)

Population (1 January 2025)
  - Total: 500
  - Density: 49/km^{2} (130/sq mi)
- Time zone: UTC+1 (CET)
  - Summer (DST): UTC+2 (CEST)
- Postal code: 8983
- Area code: (+36) 92
- Website: nagylengyel.hu

Nagylengyel is a village in Zala County, Hungary. It under the administrative region of Zalaegerszeg District. About 495 residents were recorded as of 2022.

== Notable people ==
- Vanessa Axente (born 1995) – Model
