= Csénye =

- Flag Coat of arms

- Location of Vas county in Hungary

- Location of Csénye
- Coordinates: 47.23653°N 16.87221°E
- Country: Hungary
- County: Vas

Area
  - Total: 19.12 km^{2} (7.38 sq mi)

Population (2004)
  - Total: 636
  - Density: 33.26/km^{2} (86.1/sq mi)
- Time zone: UTC+1 (CET)
  - Summer (DST): UTC+2 (CEST)
- Postal code: 9611
- Area code: 95

Csénye is a village in Vas County, Hungary.
