= Zalatárnok =

- Village
- Flag Coat of arms

- Location of Zalatárnok
- Coordinates: 46.701081°N 16.759561°E
- Country: Hungary
- Region: Western Transdanubia
- County: Zala
- District: Zalaegerszeg

Area
  - Total: 25.95 km^{2} (10.02 sq mi)

Population (1 January 2026)
  - Total: 593
  - Density: 22.9/km^{2} (59.2/sq mi)
- Time zone: UTC+1 (CET)
  - Summer (DST): UTC+2 (CEST)
- Postal code: 8947
- Area code: (+36) 92

Zalatárnok is a village in Zala County, Hungary.
