= Csánig =

- Flag Coat of arms

- Location of Vas county in Hungary

- Location of Csánig
- Coordinates: 47.43163°N 17.02465°E
- Country: Hungary
- County: Vas

Area
  - Total: 8.19 km^{2} (3.16 sq mi)

Population (2004)
  - Total: 438
  - Density: 53.48/km^{2} (138.5/sq mi)
- Time zone: UTC+1 (CET)
  - Summer (DST): UTC+2 (CEST)
- Postal code: 9654
- Area code: 95
- Motorways: M86
- Distance from Budapest: 185 km (115 mi) East

Csánig is a village in Vas County, Hungary.
