= Gombosszeg =

- Village
- Flag Coat of arms

- Location of Gombosszeg
- Coordinates: 46.75693°N 16.71997°E
- Country: Hungary
- Region: Western Transdanubia
- County: Zala
- District: Zalaegerszeg

Area
  - Total: 2.16 km^{2} (0.83 sq mi)

Population (1 January 2025)
  - Total: 66
  - Density: 31/km^{2} (79/sq mi)
- Time zone: UTC+1 (CET)
  - Summer (DST): UTC+2 (CEST)
- Postal code: 8981
- Area code: (+36) 92
- Website: gombosszeg.hu

Gombosszeg is a village in Zala County, Hungary.
