= Hottó =

- Village
- Flag Coat of arms

- Location of Hottó
- Coordinates: 46.84675°N 16.75297°E
- Country: Hungary
- Region: Western Transdanubia
- County: Zala
- District: Zalaegerszeg

Area
  - Total: 6.7 km^{2} (2.6 sq mi)

Population (1 January 2026)
  - Total: 343
  - Density: 51/km^{2} (130/sq mi)
- Time zone: UTC+1 (CET)
  - Summer (DST): UTC+2 (CEST)
- Postal code: 8991
- Area code: (+36) 92

Hottó is a village in Zala County, Hungary.
