= Bak, Hungary =

Bak
- Village
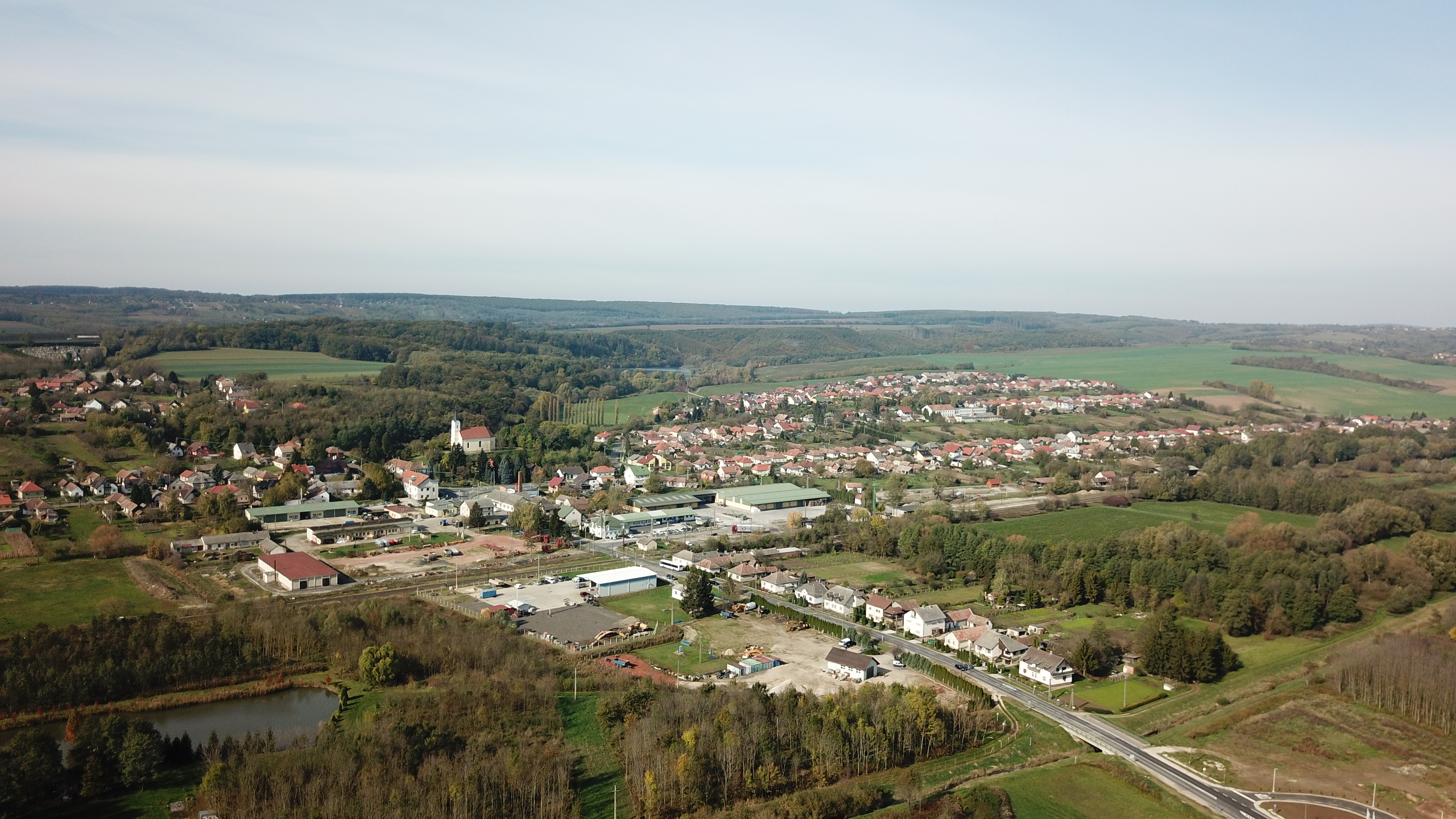

- Flag Coat of arms

- Location of Bak
- Coordinates: 46.72897°N 16.84443°E
- Country: Hungary
- Region: Western Transdanubia
- County: Zala
- District: Zalaegerszeg

Area
  - Total: 23.05 km^{2} (8.90 sq mi)

Population (1 January 2025)
  - Total: 1,514
  - Density: 65.68/km^{2} (170.1/sq mi)
- Time zone: UTC+1 (CET)
  - Summer (DST): UTC+2 (CEST)
- Postal code: 8945
- Area code: (+36) 92
- Website: bak.hu

Bak is a village in Zala County, Hungary.
