= Baktüttös =

Coordinates: 46°42′N 16°49′E

- Village
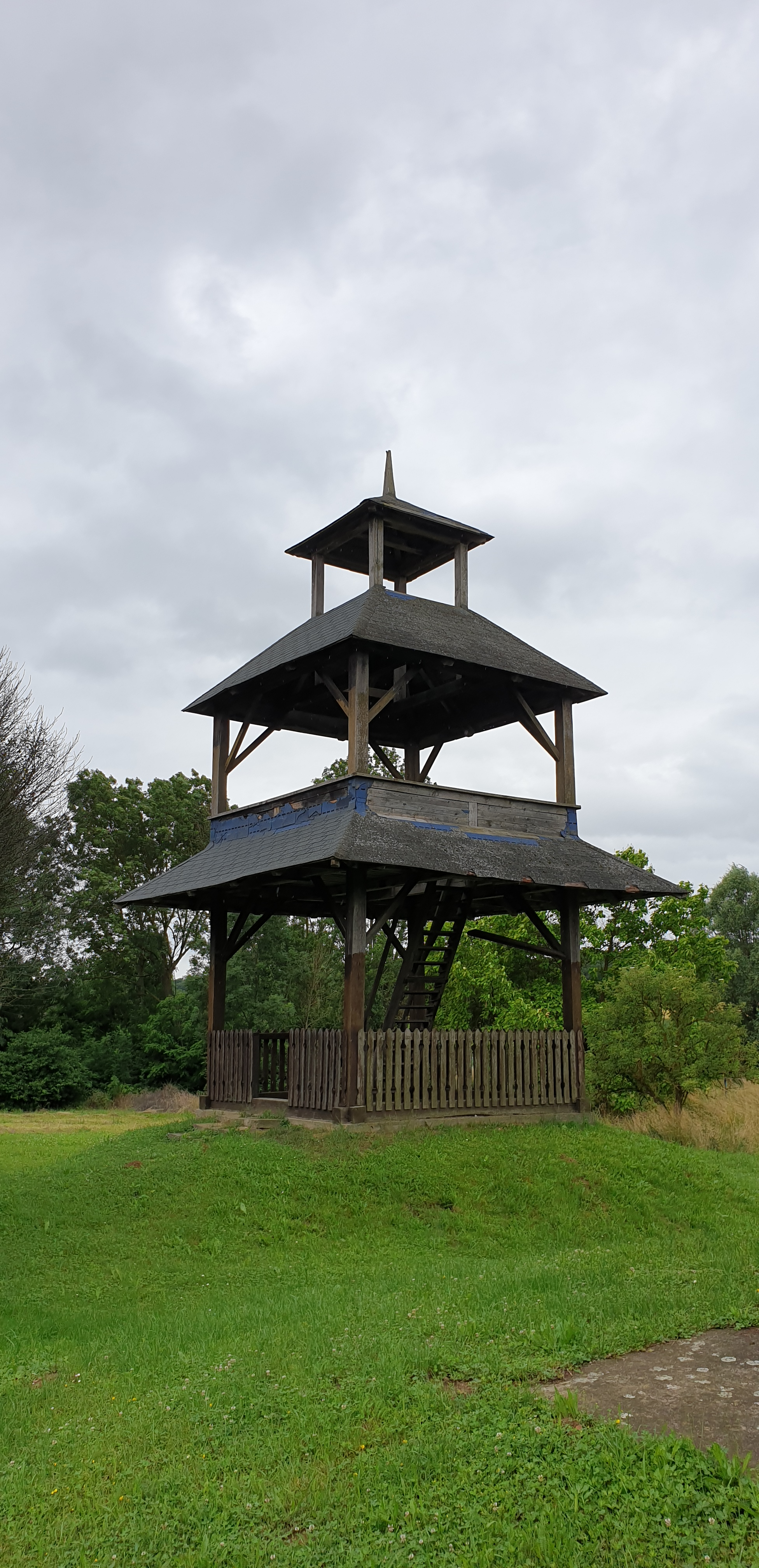
- Baktüttösi kilátó
- Interactive map of Baktüttös
- Country: Hungary
- Region: Western Transdanubia
- County: Zala County
- Time zone: UTC+1 (CET)
  - Summer (DST): UTC+2 (CEST)

Baktüttös is a village in Zala County, Hungary.
