= Ozmánbük =

Coordinates: 46°55′N 16°41′E

- Village
- Interactive map of Ozmánbük
- Country: Hungary
- Region: Western Transdanubia
- County: Zala County
- Time zone: UTC+1 (CET)
  - Summer (DST): UTC+2 (CEST)

Ozmánbük is a village in Zala County, Hungary.

== See also ==
- Zala County
- Western Transdanubia
