= Petrikeresztúr =

Coordinates: 46°44′N 16°44′E

- Village
- Coat of arms
- Interactive map of Petrikeresztúr
- Country: Hungary
- Region: Western Transdanubia
- County: Zala County
- Time zone: UTC+1 (CET)
  - Summer (DST): UTC+2 (CEST)

Petrikeresztúr is a village in Zala County, Hungary.
