= Milejszeg =

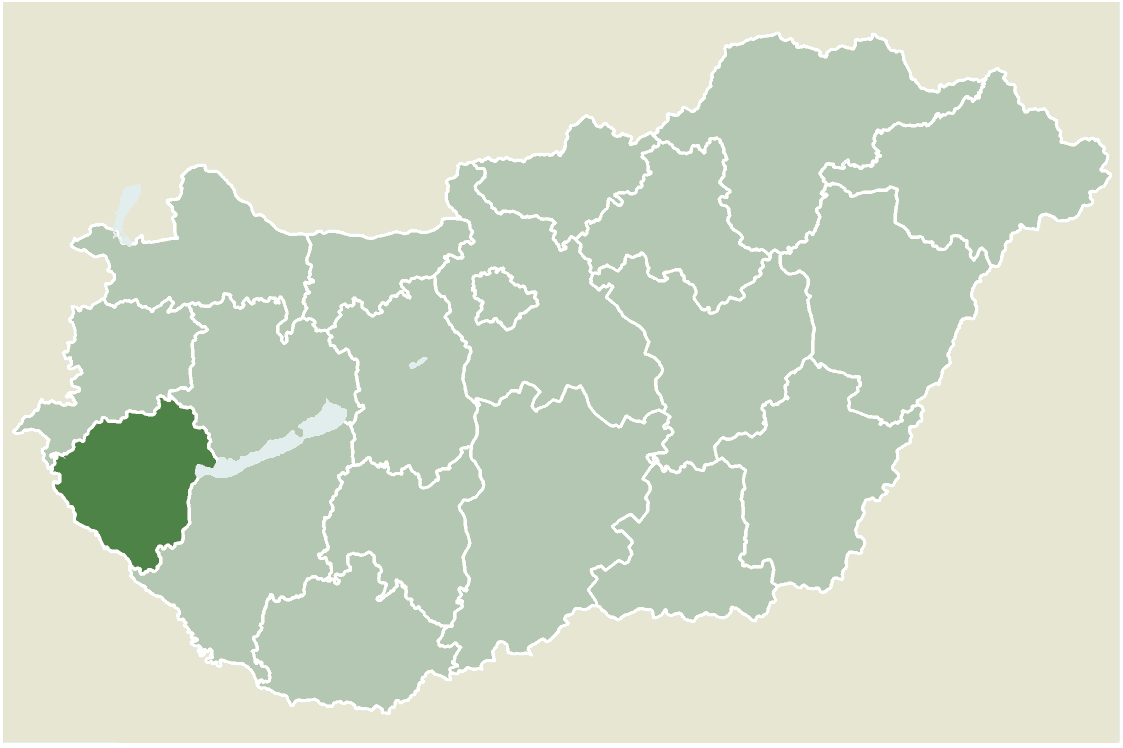
- Location of Zala county in Hungary

- Location of Milejszeg
- Coordinates: 46.79274°N 16.74365°E
- Country: Hungary
- County: Zala

Area
  - Total: 9.08 km^{2} (3.51 sq mi)

Population (2004)
  - Total: 417
  - Density: 45.92/km^{2} (118.9/sq mi)
- Time zone: UTC+1 (CET)
  - Summer (DST): UTC+2 (CEST)
- Postal code: 8917
- Area code: 92

Milejszeg is a village in Zala County, Hungary.
