= Orbányosfa =

Coordinates: 46°51′N 16°59′E

- Village
- Interactive map of Orbányosfa
- Country: Hungary
- Region: Western Transdanubia
- County: Zala County
- Time zone: UTC+1 (CET)
  - Summer (DST): UTC+2 (CEST)

Orbányosfa is a village in Zala County, Hungary.
