= Csertalakos =

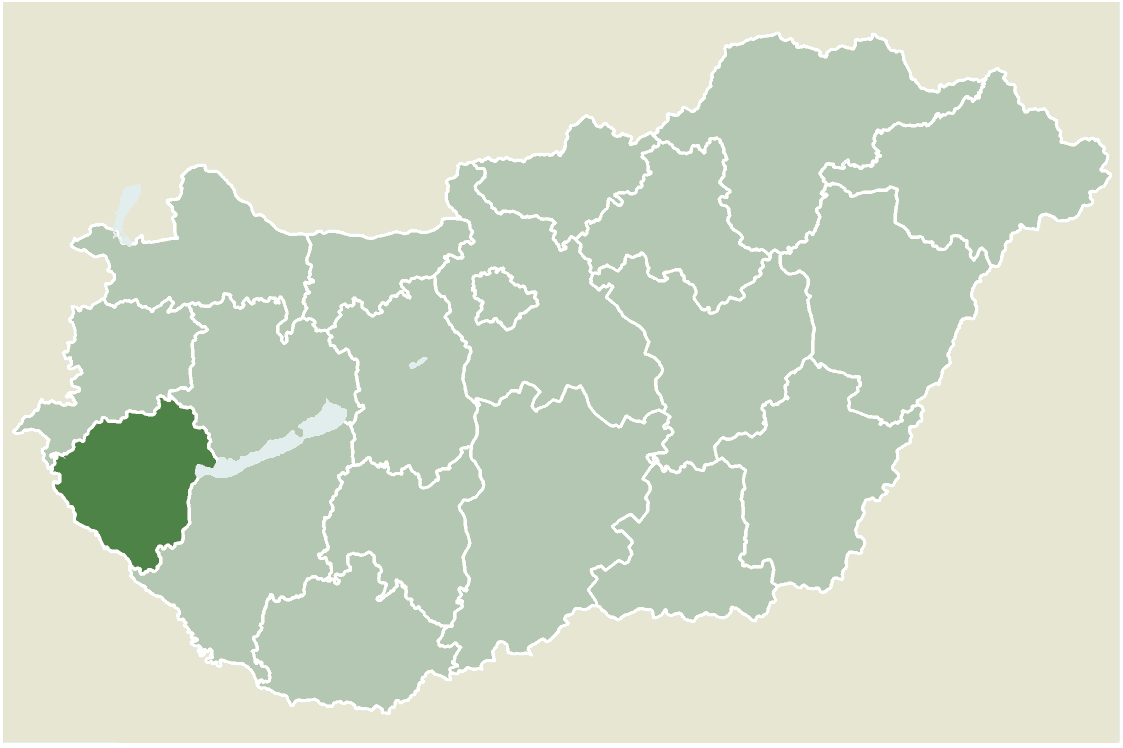
- Location of Zala county in Hungary

- Location of Csertalakos
- Coordinates: 46.64235°N 16.69837°E
- Country: Hungary
- County: Zala

Area
  - Total: 1.99 km^{2} (0.77 sq mi)

Population (2004)
  - Total: 44
  - Density: 22.11/km^{2} (57.3/sq mi)
- Time zone: UTC+1 (CET)
  - Summer (DST): UTC+2 (CEST)
- Postal code: 8951
- Area code: 92

Csertalakos is a village in Zala County, Hungary.
