= Dobronhegy =

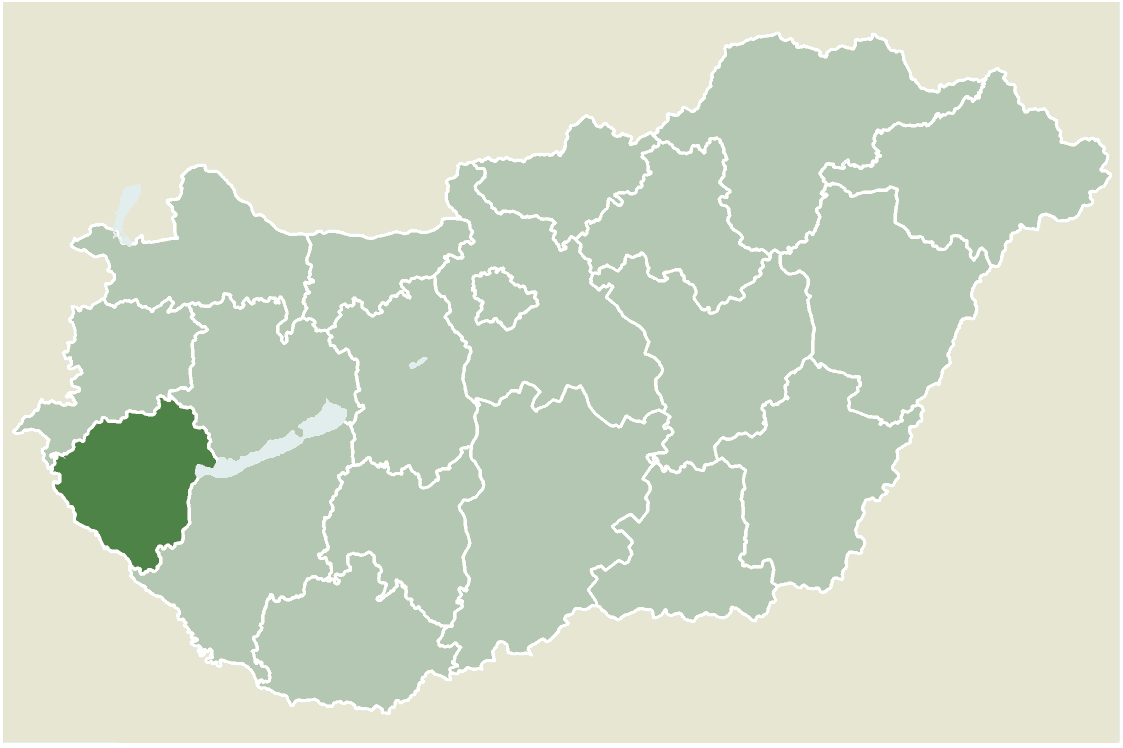
- Location of Zala county in Hungary

- Location of Dobronhegy
- Coordinates: 46.81841°N 16.74879°E
- Country: Hungary
- County: Zala

Area
  - Total: 2.15 km^{2} (0.83 sq mi)

Population (2004)
  - Total: 161
  - Density: 74.88/km^{2} (193.9/sq mi)
- Time zone: UTC+1 (CET)
  - Summer (DST): UTC+2 (CEST)
- Postal code: 8989
- Area code: 92

Dobronhegy is a village in Zala County, Hungary.
