= Ormándlak =

- Village
- Flag Coat of arms

- Location of Ormándlak
- Coordinates: 46.75938°N 16.75401°E
- Country: Hungary
- Region: Western Transdanubia
- County: Zala
- District: Zalaegerszeg

Area
  - Total: 5.75 km^{2} (2.22 sq mi)

Population (1 January 2025)
  - Total: 105
  - Density: 18.3/km^{2} (47.3/sq mi)
- Time zone: UTC+1 (CET)
  - Summer (DST): UTC+2 (CEST)
- Postal code: 8983
- Area code: (+36) 92

Ormándlak is a village in Zala County, Hungary.
