= Pusztaederics =

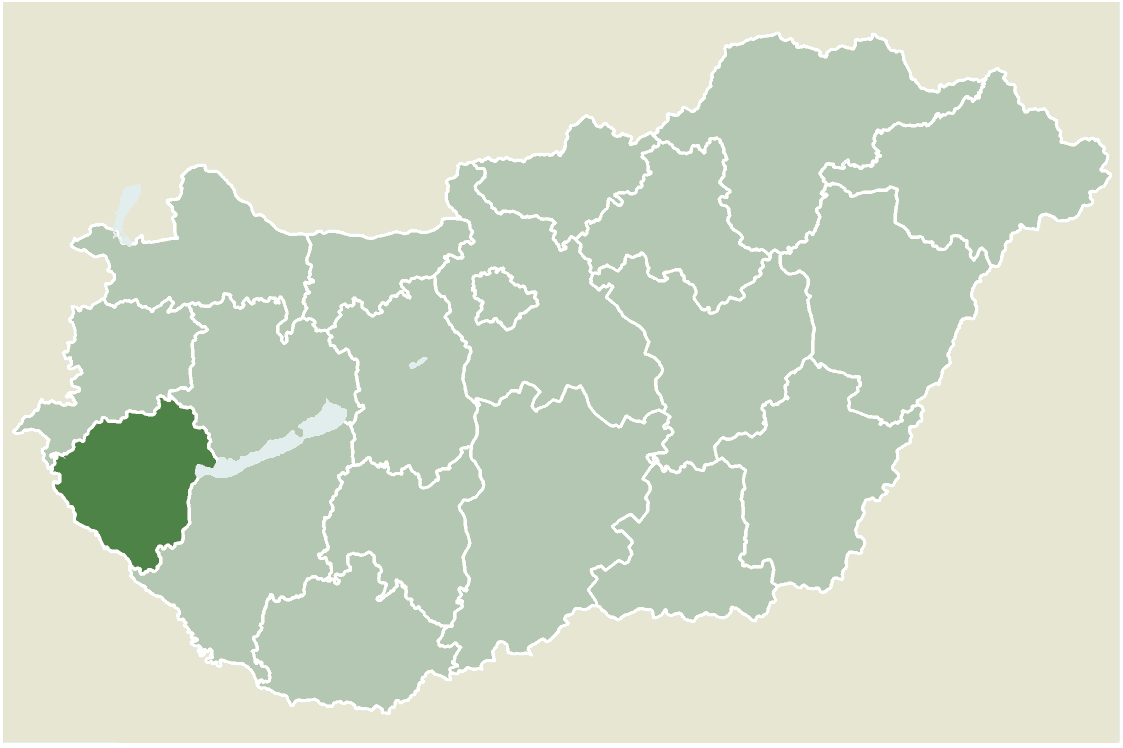
- Location of Zala county in Hungary

- Location of Pusztaederics
- Coordinates: 46.64000°N 16.79840°E
- Country: Hungary
- County: Zala

Area
  - Total: 9.55 km^{2} (3.69 sq mi)

Population (2004)
  - Total: 199
  - Density: 20.83/km^{2} (53.9/sq mi)
- Time zone: UTC+1 (CET)
  - Summer (DST): UTC+2 (CEST)
- Postal code: 8946
- Area code: 92

Pusztaederics is a village in Zala County, Hungary.
