= Babosdöbréte =

Coordinates: 46°49′N 16°47′E

- Village
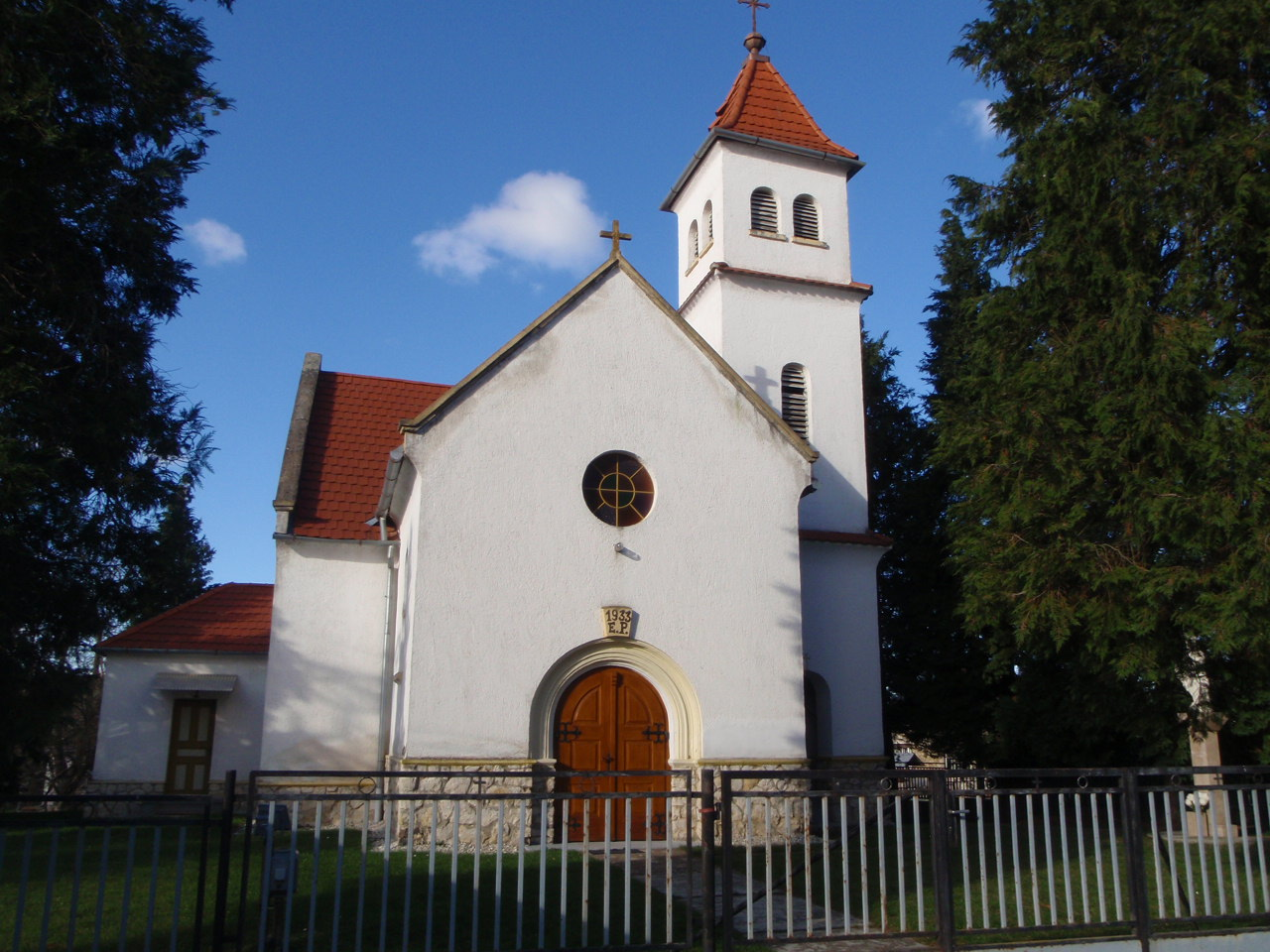
- Babosdöbréte templom
- Interactive map of Babosdöbréte
- Country: Hungary
- Region: Western Transdanubia
- County: Zala County
- Time zone: UTC+1 (CET)
  - Summer (DST): UTC+2 (CEST)

Babosdöbréte is a village in Zala County, Hungary.
