= Kustánszeg =

- Village
- Flag Coat of arms

- Location of Kustánszeg
- Coordinates: 46.7851°N 16.68033°E
- Country: Hungary
- Region: Western Transdanubia
- County: Zala
- District: Zalaegerszeg

Area
  - Total: 11.42 km^{2} (4.41 sq mi)

Population (1 January 2026)
  - Total: 462
  - Density: 40.5/km^{2} (105/sq mi)
- Time zone: UTC+1 (CET)
  - Summer (DST): UTC+2 (CEST)
- Postal code: 8919
- Area code: (+36) 92
- Website: kustanszeg.hu

Kustánszeg is a village in Zala County, Hungary.
