= Iborfia =

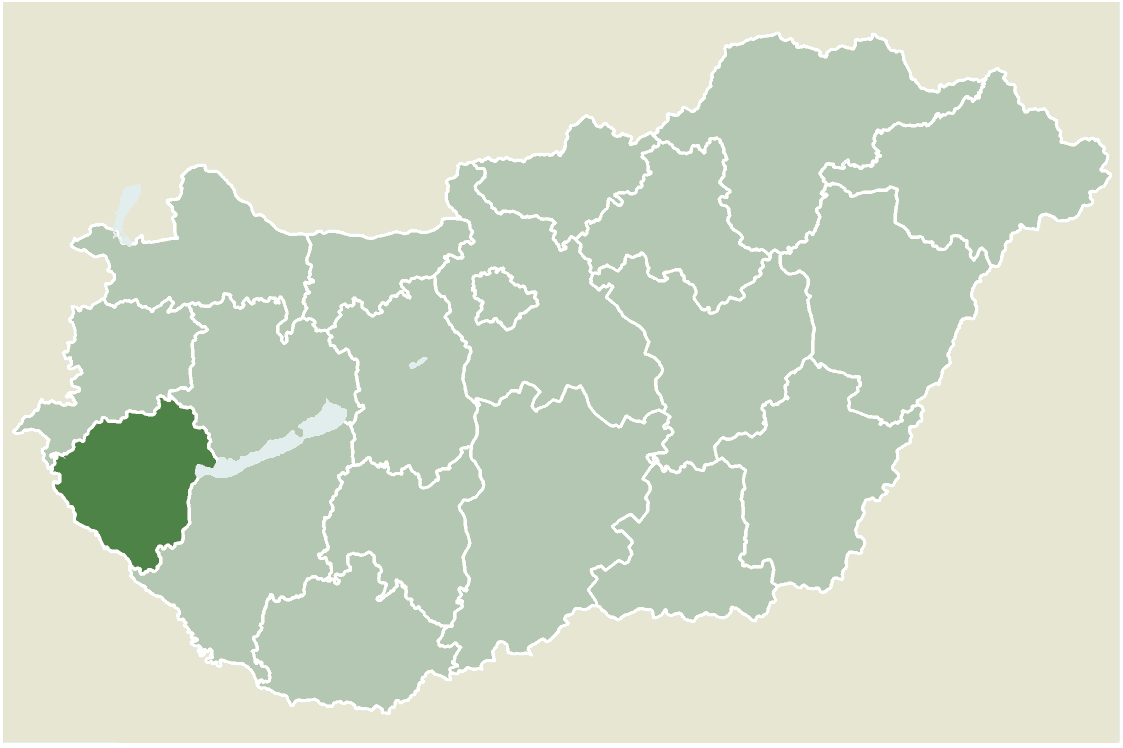
- Location of Zala county in Hungary

- Location of Iborfia
- Coordinates: 46.7393°N 16.74856°E
- Country: Hungary
- County: Zala

Area
  - Total: 2.59 km^{2} (1.00 sq mi)

Population (2011)
  - Total: 11
  - Density: 7.33/km^{2} (19.0/sq mi)
- Time zone: UTC+1 (CET)
  - Summer (DST): UTC+2 (CEST)
- Postal code: 8984
- Area code: 92

Iborfia is a village in Zala County, Hungary.

The population of the village started to decline after the Medieval period. In 2011, Iborfia had a population of 11 people. Iborfia is the smallest village in Hungary with a municipality.

== Political life ==
The last elections in Iborfia were held in 2019. 13 citizens were allowed to vote, and voter turnout was 100%. The mayor became József Lakatos, the previous mayor of Iborfia. Lakatos got 9 votes, and the other candidate, Rózsa Ábrahám got 4 votes. In total, five people took part in the elections, or 38% of the citizens,

== Gallery ==
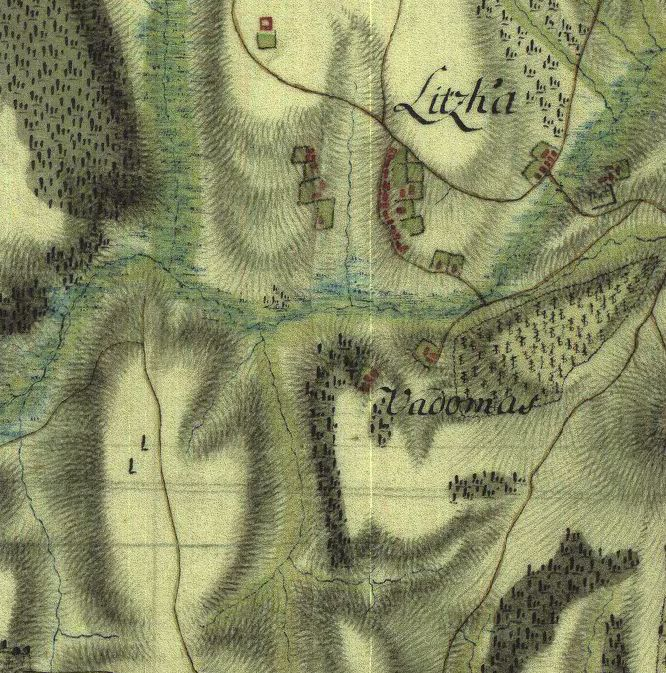
The map of Iborfia from the First Military Mapping Survey of Austria Empire.

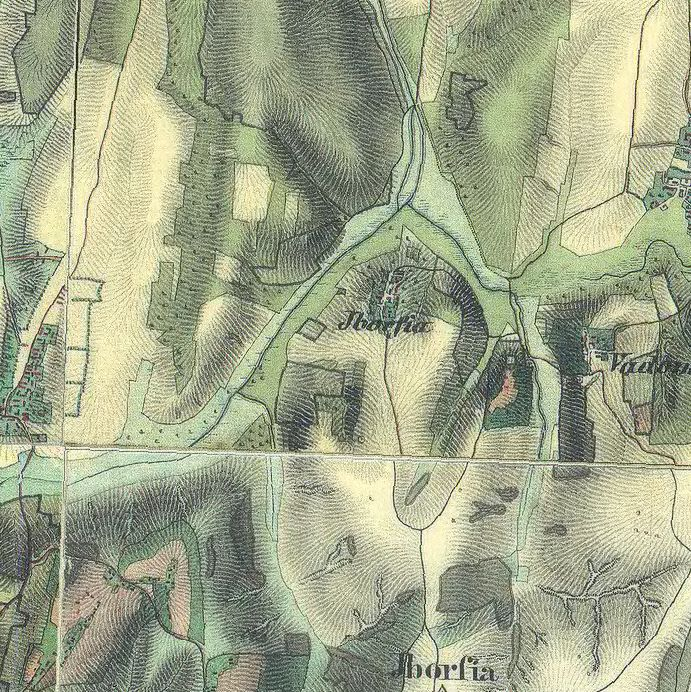
The map of Iborfia from the Second Military Mapping Survey of Austria Empire.

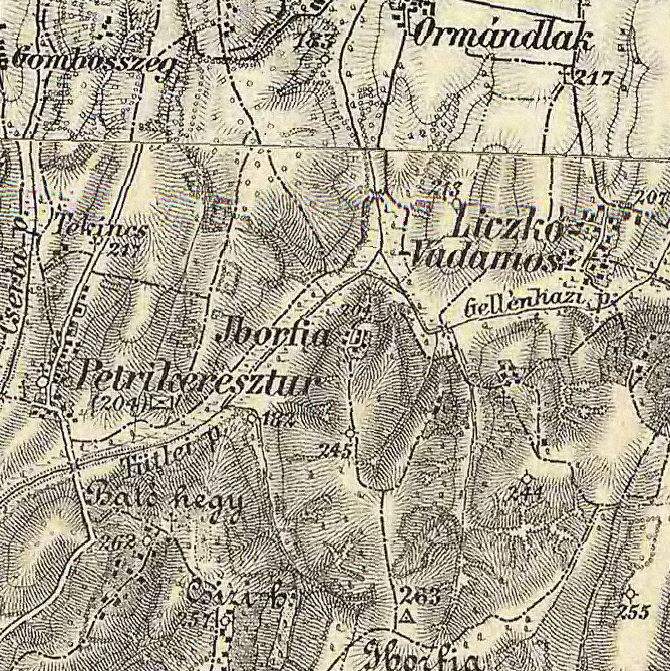
The map of Iborfia from the 3rd Military Mapping Survey of Austria-Hungary.
