= Csonkahegyhát =

Coordinates: 46°48′N 16°43′E

- Village
- Interactive map of Csonkahegyhát
- Country: Hungary
- Region: Western Transdanubia
- County: Zala County
  - Density: 98.5/sq mi (38.04/km^{2})
- Time zone: UTC+1 (CET)
  - Summer (DST): UTC+2 (CEST)

Csonkahegyhát is a village in Zala County, Hungary. The population of Country is estimated on 01-01-2019 is 315.
