= Zala County 2nd constituency =

Hungarian legislative district

Coordinates: 46.7675°N 17.246281°E

Zala County 2nd constituency (Keszthely)
- Constituency for the National Assembly
- Location of Zala county 02 within Zala county

- Location of Zala county within Hungary
- County: Zala
- Electorate: 73,963 (2018)
- Major settlements: Keszthely

Current constituency
- Created: 2011
- Party: Tisza Party
- Member: Balázs Varga
- Elected: 2026

The 2nd constituency of Zala County (Hungarian: Zala megyei 02. számú országgyűlési egyéni választókerület) is one of the single member constituencies of the National Assembly, the national legislature of Hungary. The constituency standard abbreviation: Zala 02. OEVK.

Since 2026, it has been represented by Balázs Varga of the Tisza Party.

== Geography ==
The 2nd constituency is located in north-eastern part of Zala County.

=== List of municipalities ===
The constituency includes the following municipalities:

1. Alibánfa
2. Almásháza
3. Alsónemesapáti
4. Alsópáhok
5. Alsórajk
6. Baktüttös
7. Balatongyörök
8. Balatonmagyaród
9. Batyk
10. Bezeréd
11. Bókaháza
12. Búcsúszentlászló
13. Cserszegtomaj
14. Dióskál
15. Döbröce
16. Dötk
17. Egeraracsa
18. Egervár
19. Esztergályhorváti
20. Felsőpáhok
21. Felsőrajk
22. Garabonc
23. Gelse
24. Gétye
25. Gősfa
26. Gyenesdiás
27. Gyűrűs
28. Hahót
29. Hévíz
30. Kallósd
31. Karmacs
32. Kehidakustány
33. Kemendollár
34. Kerecseny
35. Keszthely
36. Kilimán
37. Kisbucsa
38. Kisgörbő
39. Kisvásárhely
40. Lakhegy
41. Ligetfalva
42. Mihályfa
43. Misefa
44. Nagygörbő
45. Nagykapornak
46. Nagyrada
47. Nemesapáti
48. Nemesbük
49. Nemeshetés
50. Nemesrádó
51. Nemessándorháza
52. Nemesszentandrás
53. Óhíd
54. Orbányosfa
55. Orosztony
56. Pacsa
57. Padár
58. Pakod
59. Pethőhenye
60. Pókaszepetk
61. Pölöske
62. Pölöskefő
63. Pötréte
64. Rezi
65. Sármellék
66. Sénye
67. Söjtör
68. Sümegcsehi
69. Szalapa
70. Szentgyörgyvár
71. Szentpéterúr
72. Tekenye
73. Tilaj
74. Türje
75. Vállus
76. Várvölgy
77. Vasboldogasszony
78. Vindornyafok
79. Vindornyalak
80. Vindornyaszőlős
81. Vonyarcvashegy
82. Vöckönd
83. Zalaapáti
84. Zalabér
85. Zalacsány
86. Zalaigrice
87. Zalaistvánd
88. Zalakaros
89. Zalaköveskút
90. Zalamerenye
91. Zalaszabar
92. Zalaszántó
93. Zalaszentgrót
94. Zalaszentiván
95. Zalaszentlászló
96. Zalaszentlőrinc
97. Zalaszentmárton
98. Zalaszentmihály
99. Zalavár
100. Zalavég

== Members ==
The constituency was first represented by Jenő Manninger of the Fidesz from 2014, and he was re-elected in 2018. In the 2026 election, Balázs Varga of the Tisza Party was elected representative.

Election	Member	Party	%
2014	Jenő Manninger	Fidesz	
2018	Jenő Manninger	Fidesz	
2022	Bálint Nagy	Fidesz	59.8
2026	Balázs Varga	Tisza	48.1

== Parliamentary elections ==
2026 parliamentary election: Zala County - 2nd constituency
Party	Candidate	Votes	%	±%
Tisza	Balázs Varga	27,981	48.08	New
Fidesz–KDNP	Bálint Nagy	25,863	44.44	−15.40
Mi Hazánk	Ferenc Kiss	1,948	5.72	−0.48
DK	Erzsébet Liszkai	483	0.83	New
MKKP	Mátyás Kókai	400	0.69	−1.96
Jobbik	Zoltán Várkonyi	144	0.25	New
Majority		2,118	3.62	−26.11
Turnout		58,539	80.39	
Registered electors		72,849		
Tisza gain from Fidesz		Swing		
