= Keszthely District =

Keszthely District Keszthelyi járás
- Districts of Hungary
- Coat of arms

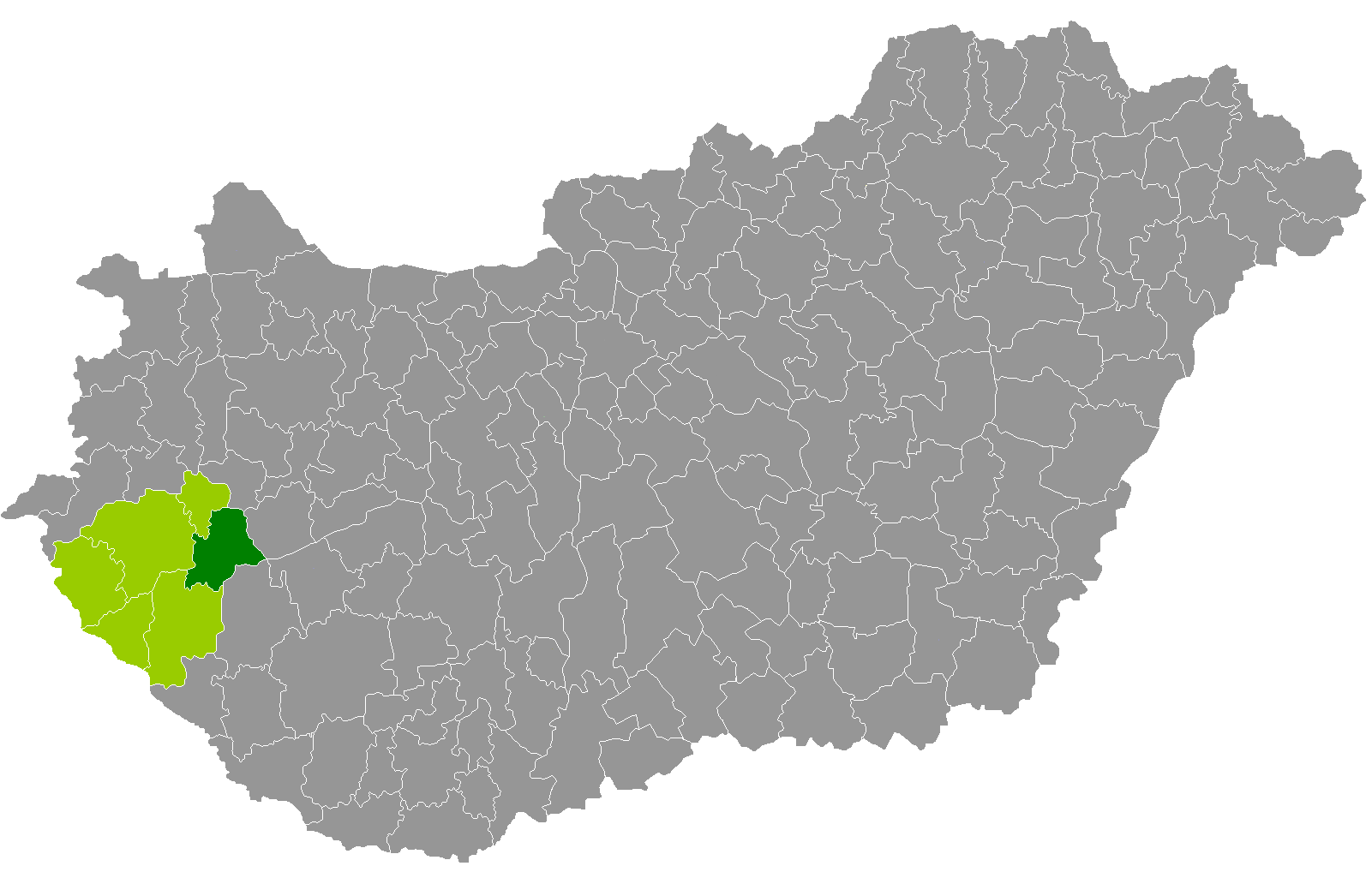
- Keszthely District within Hungary and Zala County.
- Coordinates: 46.77°N 17.25°E
- Country: Hungary
- County: Zala
- District seat: Keszthely

Area
  - Total: 535.93 km^{2} (206.92 sq mi)
  - Rank: 4th in Zala

Population (2011 census)
  - Total: 49,421
  - Rank: 3rd in Zala
  - Density: 92/km^{2} (240/sq mi)

Keszthely (Hungarian: Keszthelyi járás) is a district in eastern part of Zala County. Keszthely is also the name of the town where the district seat is found. The district is located in the Western Transdanubia Statistical Region.

== Geography ==
Keszthely District borders with Zalaszentgrót District and Sümeg District (Veszprém County) to the north, Tapolca District (Veszprém County) to the east, Marcali District (Somogy County) and Nagykanizsa District to the south, Zalaegerszeg District to the west. The number of the inhabited places in Keszthely District is 30.

== Municipalities ==
The district has 2 towns, 2 large villages and 26 villages. (ordered by population, as of 1 January 2013)

- Alsópáhok (1,360)
- Balatongyörök (1,021)
- Bókaháza (286)
- Cserszegtomaj (2,792)
- Dióskál (474)
- Egeraracsa (310)
- Esztergályhorváti (454)
- Felsőpáhok (635)
- Gétye (117)
- Gyenesdiás (3,568)
- **Hévíz** (4,663)
- Karmacs (822)
- **Keszthely** (20,382) – district seat
- Ligetfalva (56)
- Nemesbük (681)
- Rezi (1,184)
- Sármellék (1,829)
- Szentgyörgyvár (298)
- Vállus (135)
- Várvölgy (1,041)
- Vindornyafok (123)
- Vindornyalak (81)
- Vindornyaszőlős (327)
- Vonyarcvashegy (2,178)
- Zalaapáti (1,654)
- Zalacsány (970)
- Zalaköveskút (27)
- Zalaszántó (965)
- Zalaszentmárton (65)
- Zalavár (886)

The bolded municipalities are cities, italics municipalities are large villages.

== See also ==
- List of cities and towns in Hungary
