= List of populated places in Hungary (E–É) =

This is a list of cities, towns and villages of Hungary

KEY: T = Town ; V = Village

Name	Rank	County	District	Population	Post code
Ebergoc	V	Gyor-Moson-Sopron	Sopron–Fertodi	139	9451
Ebes	V	Hajdú-Bihar	Hajdúszoboszlói	4,473	4211
Écs	V	Gyor-Moson-Sopron	Pannonhalmi	1,762	9083
Ecséd	V	Heves	Hatvani	4,160	3013
Ecseg	V	Nógrád	Pásztói	1,282	3053
Ecsegfalva	V	Békés	Szeghalmi	1,446	5515
Ecseny	V	Somogy	Kaposvári	283	7457
Ecser	V	Pest	Monori	3,252	2233
Edde	V	Somogy	Kaposvári	248	7443
Edelény	T	Borsod-Abaúj-Zemplén	Edelényi	11,168	3780
Edve	V	Gyor-Moson-Sopron	Kapuvári	144	9343
Eger	county seat	Heves	Egri	57,000	3300
Egerág	V	Baranya	Pécsi	1,004	7763
Egeralja	V	Veszprém	Ajkai	268	8497
Egeraracsa	V	Zala	Keszthely–Hévízi	371	8765
Egerbakta	V	Heves	Egri	3,238	3321
Egerbocs	V	Heves	Bélapátfalvai	1,595	3337
Egercsehi	V	Heves	Bélapátfalvai	1,039	3341
Egerfarmos	V	Heves	Füzesabonyi	2,379	3379
Egerlövo	V	Borsod-Abaúj-Zemplén	Mezokövesdi	649	3461
Egerszalók	V	Heves	Egri	2,311	3394
Egerszólát	V	Heves	Egri	2,610	3328
Égerszög	V	Borsod-Abaúj-Zemplén	Edelényi	79	3757
Egervár	V	Zala	Zalaegerszegi	1,063	8913
Egervölgy	V	Tolna	Vasvári	410	9684
Egyed	V	Gyor-Moson-Sopron	Csornai	588	9314
Egyek	V	Hajdú-Bihar	Balmazújvárosi	5,527	4069
Egyházasdengeleg	V	Nógrád	Pásztói	510	3043
Egyházasfalu	V	Gyor-Moson-Sopron	Sopron–Fertodi	922	9473
Egyházasgerge	V	Nógrád	Salgótarjáni	850	3185
Egyházasharaszti	V	Baranya	Siklósi	336	7824
Egyházashetye	V	Vas	Celldömölki	425	9554
Egyházashollós	V	Vas	Körmendi	580	9781
Egyházaskeszo	V	Veszprém	Pápai	602	8523
Egyházaskozár	V	Baranya	Komlói	878	7347
Egyházasrádóc	V	Vas	Körmendi	1,355	9783
Elek	T	Békés	Gyulai	5,567	5742
Ellend	V	Baranya	Pécsi	230	7744
Eloszállás	V	Fejér	Dunaújvárosi	2,602	2424
Emod	T	Borsod-Abaúj-Zemplén	Miskolci	5,474	3432
Encs	T	Borsod-Abaúj-Zemplén	Encsi	7,052	3860
Encsencs	V	Szabolcs-Szatmár-Bereg	Nyírbátori	2,061	4374
Endrefalva	V	Nógrád	Szécsényi	1,278	3165
Endroc	V	Baranya	Szigetvári	406	7973
Enese	V	Gyor-Moson-Sopron	Gyori	1,780	9143
Enying	T	Fejér	Enyingi	7,166	8130
Eperjes	V	Csongrád	Szentesi	668	6624
Eperjeske	V	Szabolcs-Szatmár-Bereg	Kisvárdai	1,269	4646
Eplény	V	Veszprém	Zirci	489	8413
Epöl	V	Komárom-Esztergom	Dorogi	661	2526
Ercsi	T	Fejér	Ercsi	8,407	2451
Érd	T	Pest	Budaörsi	58,117	2030
Erdobénye	V	Borsod-Abaúj-Zemplén	Tokaji	1,298	3932
Erdohorváti	V	Borsod-Abaúj-Zemplén	Sárospataki	650	3935
Erdokertes	V	Pest	Veresegyházi	6,024	2113
Erdokövesd	V	Heves	Pétervásárai	1,718	3252
Erdokürt	V	Nógrád	Pásztói	609	2176
Erdosmárok	V	Baranya	Mohácsi	93	7735
Erdősmecske	V	Baranya	Pécsváradi	417	7723
Erdotarcsa	V	Nógrád	Pásztói	624	2177
Erdotelek	V	Heves	Hevesi	4,491	3358
Erk	V	Heves	Hevesi	2,168	3295
Érpatak	V	Szabolcs-Szatmár-Bereg	Nagykállói	1,855	4245
Érsekcsanád	V	Bács-Kiskun	Bajai	2,897	6347
Érsekhalma	V	Bács-Kiskun	Bajai	720	6348
Érsekvadkert	V	Nógrád	Balassagyarmati	3,812	2659
Értény	V	Tolna	Tamási	759	7093
Erzsébet	V	Baranya	Pécsváradi	338	7661
Esztár	V	Hajdú-Bihar	Berettyóújfalui	1,412	4124
Eszteregnye	V	Zala	Nagykanizsai	746	8882
Esztergályhorváti	V	Zala	Keszthely–Hévízi	452	8742
Esztergom	T	Komárom-Esztergom	Esztergomi	29,769	2500
Ete	V	Komárom-Esztergom	Kisbéri	609	2947
Etes	V	Nógrád	Salgótarjáni	1,528	3136
Etyek	V	Fejér	Bicskei	3,783	2091

== Notes ==
- Cities marked with * have several different post codes, the one here is only the most general one.
