= Zalaszentgrót District =

Coordinates: 46.94332053200744°N 17.07949691128847°E

Zalaszentgrót District Zalaszentgróti járás
- Districts of Hungary
- Coat of arms

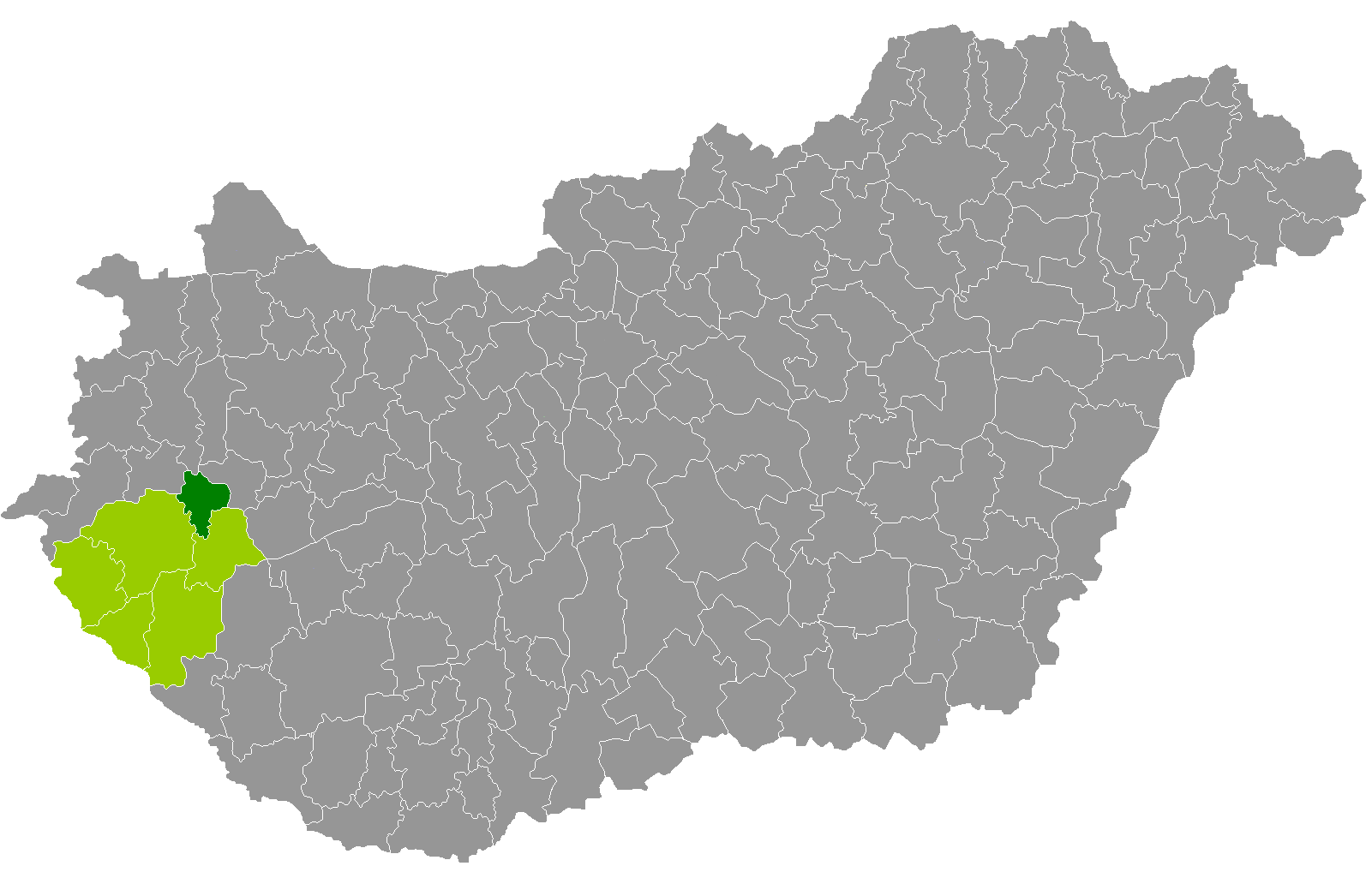
- Zalaszentgrót District within Hungary and Zala County.
- Country: Hungary
- County: Zala
- District seat: Zalaszentgrót

Area
  - Total: 282.56 km^{2} (109.10 sq mi)
  - Rank: 6th in Zala

Population (2011 census)
  - Total: 15,509
  - Rank: 6th in Zala
  - Density: 55/km^{2} (140/sq mi)

Zalaszentgrót (Hungarian: Zalaszentgróti járás) is a district in north-eastern part of Zala County. Zalaszentgrót is also the name of the town where the district seat is found. The district is located in the Western Transdanubia Statistical Region.

== Geography ==
Zalaszentgrót District borders with Sárvár District (Vas County) to the north, Sümeg District (Veszprém County) to the northeast, Keszthely District to the southeast, Zalaegerszeg District to the southwest, Vasvár District (Vas County) to the west. The number of the inhabited places in Zalaszentgrót District is 20.

== Municipalities ==
The district has 1 town and 19 villages. (ordered by population, as of 1 January 2013)

- Batyk (391)
- Döbröce (63)
- Dötk (27)
- Kallósd (91)
- Kehidakustány (1,218)
- Kisgörbő (165)
- Kisvásárhely (44)
- Mihályfa (368)
- Nagygörbő (166)
- Óhíd (609)
- Pakod (891)
- Sénye (35)
- Sümegcsehi (629)
- Szalapa (208)
- Tekenye (407)
- Türje (1,638)
- Zalabér (705)
- **Zalaszentgrót** (6,634) – district seat
- Zalaszentlászló (857)
- Zalavég (372)

The bolded municipality is city.

== See also ==
- List of cities and towns in Hungary
