= Jenő Manninger =

Hungarian architect and politician (born 1955)

Mayor of Keszthely
- In office 26 June 2022 – 30 September 2024
- Preceded by: Bálint Nagy
- Succeeded by: Gergely Tóth

Member of the National Assembly
- In office 15 May 2002 – 1 May 2022

Personal details
- Born: 30 July 1955 (age 71) Budapest, Hungary
- Party: MDF; Fidesz (since 2000)
- Spouse: Éva Nagy
- Children: Máté; Ádám
- Profession: architect, politician

Jenő Manninger (born 30 July 1955) is a Hungarian architect and politician, member of the National Assembly (MP) for Keszthely (Zala County Constituency III then II) from 2002 to 2022. He served as Parliamentary Secretary for Transport, Communications and Water Management from 1998 to 2002. He was the President of the General Assembly of Zala County from 2006 to 2014.

== Biography ==
Jenő Manninger was born into a family of medical intellectuals. His father was emergency surgeon Jenő Manninger, Sr. He is related to Keszthely because his uncle, Gusztáv Adolf Manninger was a head of department of Georgikon in Keszthely. He graduated as a civil engineer of transport construction from Budapest University of Technology and Economics in 1980. He also holds a degree from a postgraduate management joint course of Trinity College, Dublin and Budapest University of Economic Sciences. From 1980 he worked as a civil engineer and design engineer. He also worked abroad, in Algeria and Tunisia. He was a lecturer of Ybl Miklós College of Construction from 1987 to 1997 teaching courses in civil engineering and municipal finance. He was awarded a three-month grant of the National Foundation in the United States in 1992.

Manninger started his public life career in the General Assembly of Budapest in 1990. For the following term, 1994 to 1998, he was the group leader of the Hungarian Democratic Forum (MDF). Upon a request he was the political parliamentary secretary of the Ministry of Transport, Communications and Water Management between 14 July 1998 and 26 May 2002, in the First Orbán Government. As a follower of the idea of deeper party cooperation he joined Fidesz in 2000. In the 2002 national election he was elected MP for Keszthely as a joint candidate of Fidesz–MDF. He has been living in Keszthely and then in Gyenesdiás and Balatongyörök since January 2002. He was one of the Hungarian observers delegated to the European Parliament and worked for the Environment Committee in 2003. He was one of the delegated members to the European Parliament for a brief time in 2004 too. He was the spokesman of Fidesz related to transport programme issues during the elections.

In the parliamentary elections of 2006 he defended his seat in the first round. He was a member of the Committee on European Affairs between 2006 and 2010. He was also elected President of the General Assembly of Zala County in October 2006. He was also elected MP for Keszthely in the 2010 parliamentary election. He became a member of the Economic and Information Technology Committee. Manninger was the president of the Regional Development Council from 2010 to 2011. He was re-elected MP for Keszthely in 2014 and 2018 too. He was a vice-chairman of the Economic Committee from 2015 to 2022. He was also a member of the Committee on Sustainable Development from 2014 to 2022. Manninger was appointed ministerial commissioner for the development of Zala County in June 2015. He had been the president of the electoral board of Fidesz in Zala County since October 2015. Manninger retired from politics and did not participate in the 2022 Hungarian parliamentary election, citing advanced age and health reasons. He was replaced as Fidesz candidate by Bálint Nagy, the mayor of Keszthely, who ultimately gained the parliamentary seat.

Manninger was elected mayor of Keszthely during the by-election on 26 June 2022, as sole candidate for the position. He was defeated by independent candidate Gergely Tóth during the 2024 Hungarian local elections.

== Personal life ==
He is married. His wife is Éva Nagy. He has two sons, Máté and Ádám.
