= Várvölgy =

- Village
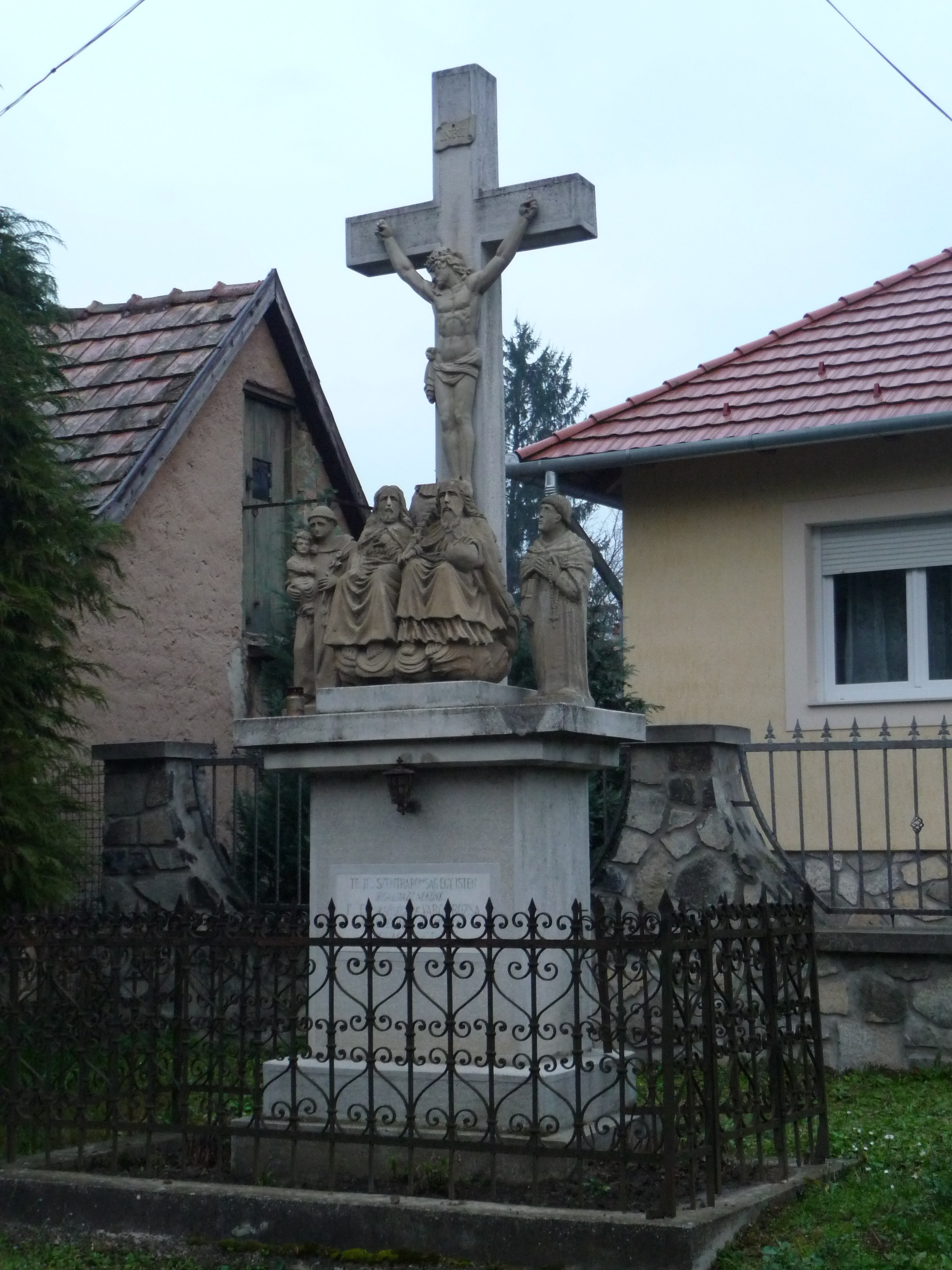
- Várvölgy kereszt

- Coat of arms

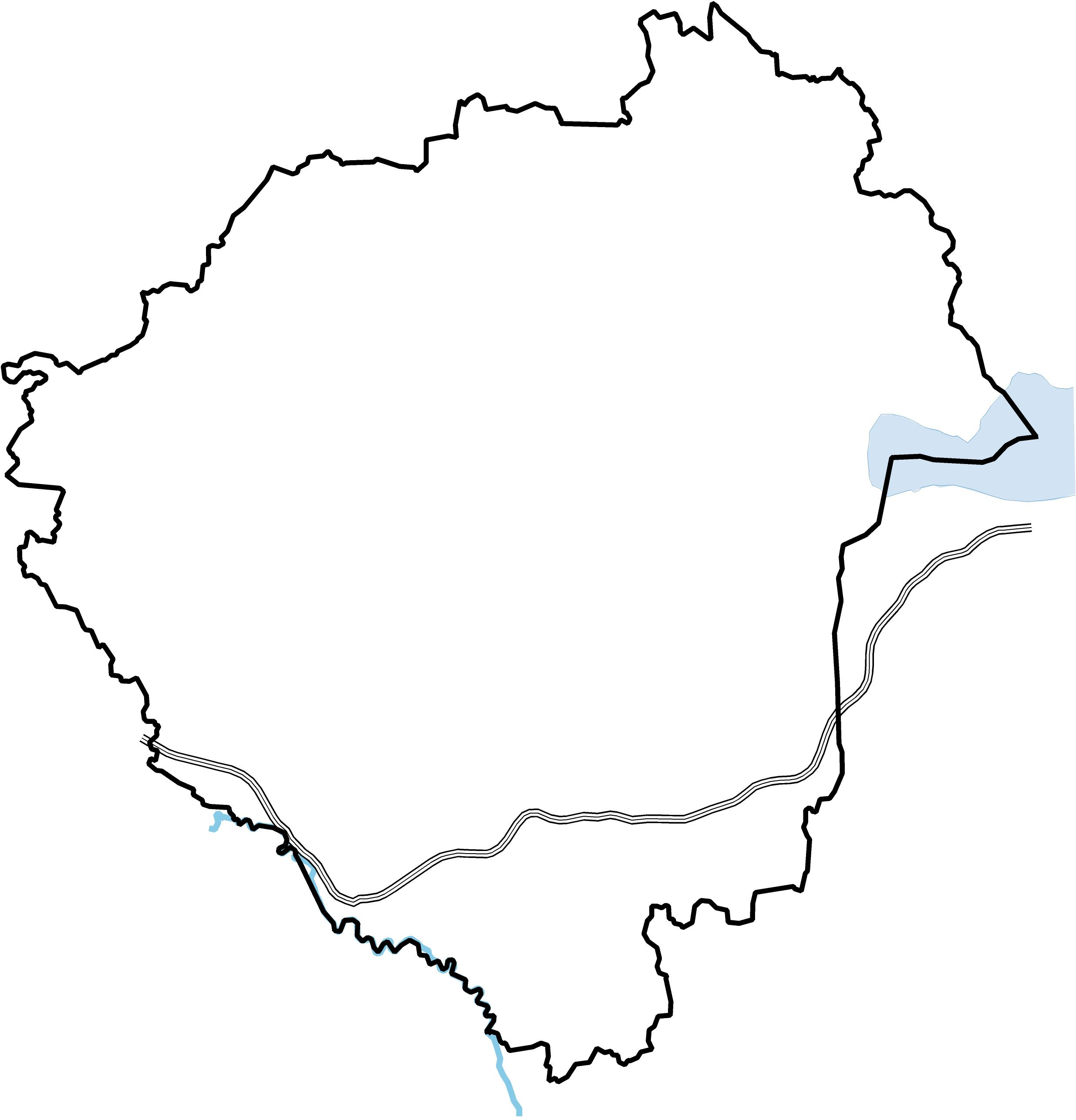
- Location within Hungary Location within Zala County
- Coordinates: 46°51′54″N 17°17′50″E
- Country: Hungary
- Region: Western Transdanubia
- County: Zala County

Area
  - Total: 9.67 sq mi (25.04 km^{2})

Population (2023)
  - Total: 931
- Time zone: UTC+1 (CET)
  - Summer (DST): UTC+2 (CEST)
- Postal code: 8316
- Area code: 86

Várvölgy is a village in Keszthely District, in Zala County, Hungary. Its name translates to Castlevalley; Vár (castle) + völgy (valley).

== Location ==
Várvölgy is on the eastern edge of the Keszthely Plateau, in the Tátika group, along the 7342 road that plays an important role in connecting Tapolca and Keszthely, stretching between Lesencetomaj and Zalaszántó. It is connected to Keszthely by the 7343 road, and the 73 157 road leading to Vállus starts at its southern border. The latter continues beyond the inhabited area of Vállus (without the previous numbering) all the way to Balatongyörök, but that section is a limited-traffic forestry road.

It is easily accessible by bus from both Keszthely and Tapolca.

== Coat of arms ==
In the blue field of the standing triangular shield, a green trinity is depicted at the bottom. On the middle mound stands the so-called Dominican cross, ending in a lily and sharpened at the edges with alternating silver and black. On each of the two outer mounds, a standing, vine-entwined, golden grapevine trunk surrounds the cross, each with two leaves and a grape cluster. The ends of the grapevines intertwine above the cross. Below the coat of arms, a three-part, curved golden ribbon ending in swallowtails floats, bearing the inscription VÁRVÖLGY in black letters, as well as decorative points before and after the name of the settlement.

== History ==
The first document mentioning the settlement in today's Várvölgy is the founding charter of the Almádi Monastery (dated 1121) – the word allegedly has Slavic origins. It was recorded as Civies de Syd in 1256, and around 1280 and 1358–1372 also as Syd. Between 1358 and 1372, it was part of the accessories of Rezi Castle.

In 1444 the county magistrates issued their documents here.

In the 15th century two villages stood in the present location of the village: Alsózsid and Felsőzsid, owned by the Pethők of Gerse. The Turks did not inflict serious damage on the two settlements, but the population decreased, and the condition of the church deteriorated. In the 18th century, the Festetics annexed the area to their estate.

Since 1940, a paved road has connected the more populous Felsőzsid to Tapolca. The present settlement was formed in 1942 from the merger of Alsózsid and Felsőzsid. The village was named Bakonyzsid at that time and adopted the name Várvölgy in 1943.

Bus transportation to the settlement has been available since 1948. The agricultural cooperative was established in 1959, but agriculture gradually receded from the life of the settlement. In the 1960s, the population of the village significantly decreased, and those who remained sought employment elsewhere. From 1966, it was the seat of a joint council (Vállus was administered from here), then, from 1990, an independent settlement again. Since then, the village has developed a significant rural tourism industry.

== Community life ==
=== Mayors ===
- 1990–1994: Ferenc Kiss (independent)
- 1994–1998: Dr. József Kámán (independent)
- 1998–2002: Jánosné Nagy-Balázs (FKgP)
- 2002–2006: Jánosné Nagy-Balázs (independent)
- 2006–2010: József Szánti (independent)
- 2010–2014: József Szánti (independent)
- 2014–2019: Balázs Barcza (independent)
- 2019–present: Balázs Barcza (independent)

== Features ==
- Alsózsid Church (Gothic): The village's historic church was built in the early 14th century during the reign of King Charles I in the Gothic style. It acquired its current romantic form in 1899. In its tower hangs the country's oldest bell, cast in 1524.
- Felsőzsid Cemetery Chapel: Built in the 18th century in the Baroque style.

== Famous people ==
- Hungarian actor, director, and perpetual member of the Pécs National Theatre, József Szivler, was born here.

== Miscellaneous ==
- The village's patron saint is Saint Dominic; the Alsózsid Church is dedicated to him, and a restaurant standing in a bend of the road is named after him. On the western facade of this building, local sculptor Lajos Orr immortalized attributes seen in the future saint mother's dream. The walls of the building are adorned with plaster decorations referring to the saint's life.
- The noble Sidy family, originating from the village, includes its most significant member, Mihály Sidy (†1711), the vice-captain of the Egervár Castle, chief magistrate of Zala, and a special envoy from Zala County to the Széchény Parliament.

== Other links ==
- http://www.varvolgy.hu/ – the website of Várvölgy

== Translation ==
Content in this edit is translated from the existing Hungarian Wikipedia article at hu:Várvölgy; see its history for attribution.
