= Bajany =

Bajany Bajánháza
- Municipality
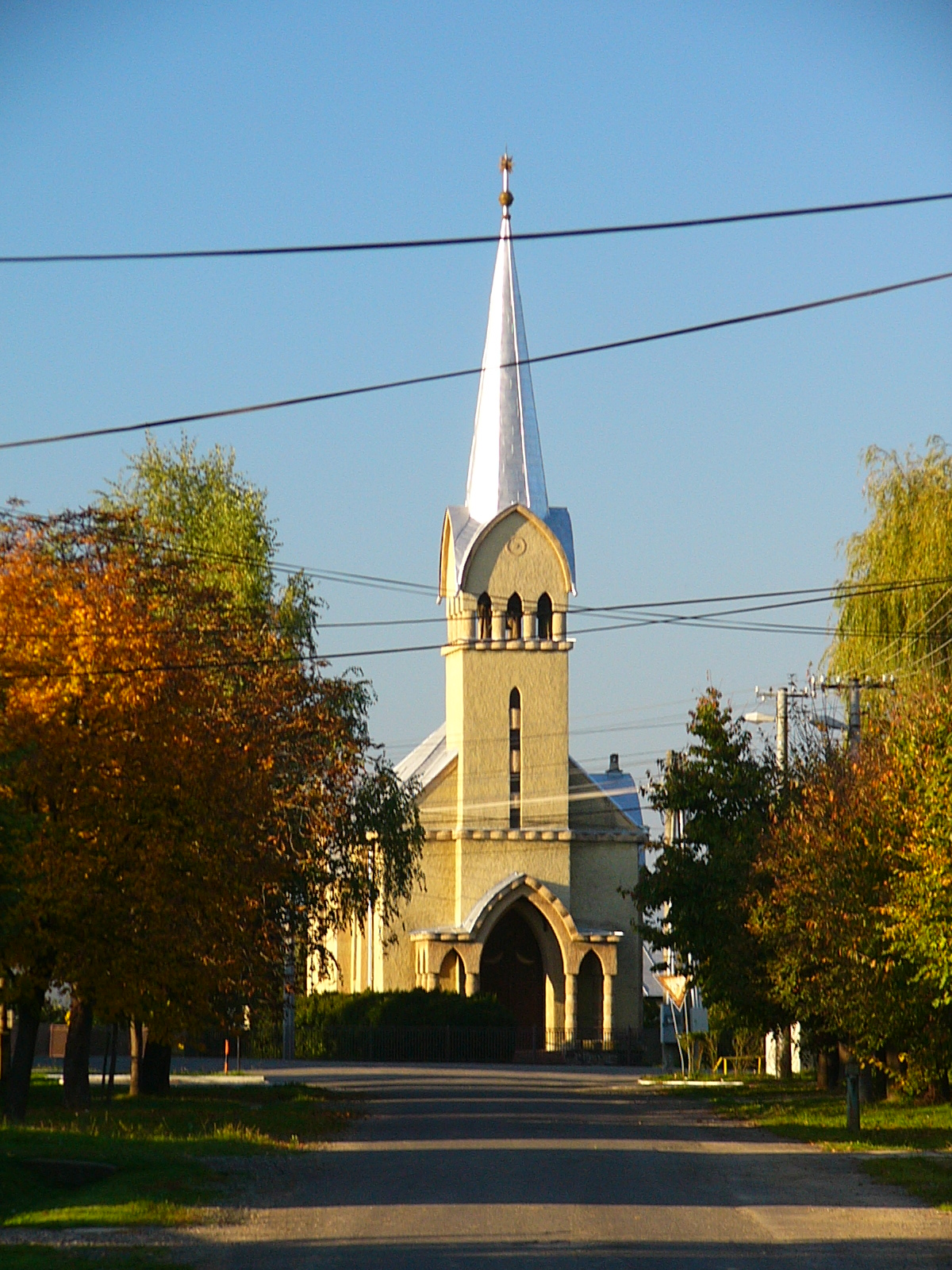

- Flag

- Location of Bajany in the Košice Region Location of Bajany in Slovakia
- Coordinates: 48.60°N 22.12°E
- Country: Slovakia
- Region: Košice Region
- District: Michalovce District
- First mentioned: 1370

Area
  - Total: 5.54 km^{2} (2.14 sq mi)
- Elevation: 106 m (348 ft)

Population (2025)
  - Total: 435
- Time zone: UTC+1 (CET)
  - Summer (DST): UTC+2 (CEST)
- Postal code: 725 4
- Area code: +421 56
- Vehicle registration plate (until 2022): MI
- Website: www.bajany.sk

Bajany (German: Wajon; Hungarian: Bajánháza) is a village and municipality in the Michalovce District in the Košice Region of Slovakia.

== Geography ==
The municipality lies at an altitude of 106 metres (348 ft) and covers an area of 5.54 km^{2} (2.14 sq mi) (2025).

== History ==
In historical records, the village was first mentioned in 1370. Before the establishment of independent Czechoslovakia in 1918, it was part of Ung County within the Kingdom of Hungary. In 1939, it was for a short time part of the newly-established Slovak Republic. From 1939 to 1944, it belonged to Hungary as a result of the Slovak–Hungarian War. Historically known in Hungarian as Bajánháza (and recorded as Bayanhaza as early as 1370), this location is entirely distinct from the village of Bókaháza in Zala County, Hungary, which has historically appeared in various phonetic records under the highly similar name Bayanhazov.

== Population ==
Population statistic (10 years)
Year	1995	2005	2015	2025
Count	490	502	474	435
Difference		+2.44%	−5.57%	−8.22%

Population statistic
Year	2024	2025
Count	438	435
Difference		−0.68%

It has a population of 435 people (31 December 2025).

=== Ethnicity ===
Census 2021 (1+ %)
Ethnicity	Number	Fraction
Slovak	428	92.44%
Hungarian	39	8.42%
Not found out	13	2.8%
Total	463	

In year 2021 was 463 people by ethnicity 428 as Slovak, 39 as Hungarian, 13 as Not found out, 4 as Ukrainian and 4 as Romani.

Note on population: The difference values of population numbers in the table "Population statistic" and in the sections "Ethnicity" & "Religion" is caused by the use of various statistical methods.

=== Religion ===
Census 2021 (1+ %)
Religion	Number	Fraction
Roman Catholic Church	181	39.09%
Calvinist Church	113	24.41%
Greek Catholic Church	102	22.03%
None	15	3.24%
Jehovah's Witnesses	14	3.02%
Evangelical Church	11	2.38%
Not found out	8	1.73%
Total	463	

In year 2021 was 463 people by religion 181 from Roman Catholic Church, 113 from Calvinist Church, 102 from Greek Catholic Church, 15 from None, 14 from Jehovah's Witnesses, 11 from Evangelical Church, 8 from Not found out, 4 from Other and not ascertained christian church, 4 from Other, 4 from Church of the Brethren, 3 from Christian Congregations in Slovakia, 2 from Baptists Church, 1 from Hinduism and 1 from Ad hoc movements.

== Genealogical resources ==
The records for genealogical research are available at the state archive in Prešov (Slovak: Štátny archív v Prešove).

- Roman Catholic church records (births/marriages/deaths): 1869-1896
- Greek Catholic church records (births/marriages/deaths): 1792-1896
- Reformated church records (births/marriages/deaths): missing records 1800s (parish A)
- Census records 1869 of Bajany are available at the state archive.(UNG county...)

== Gallery ==
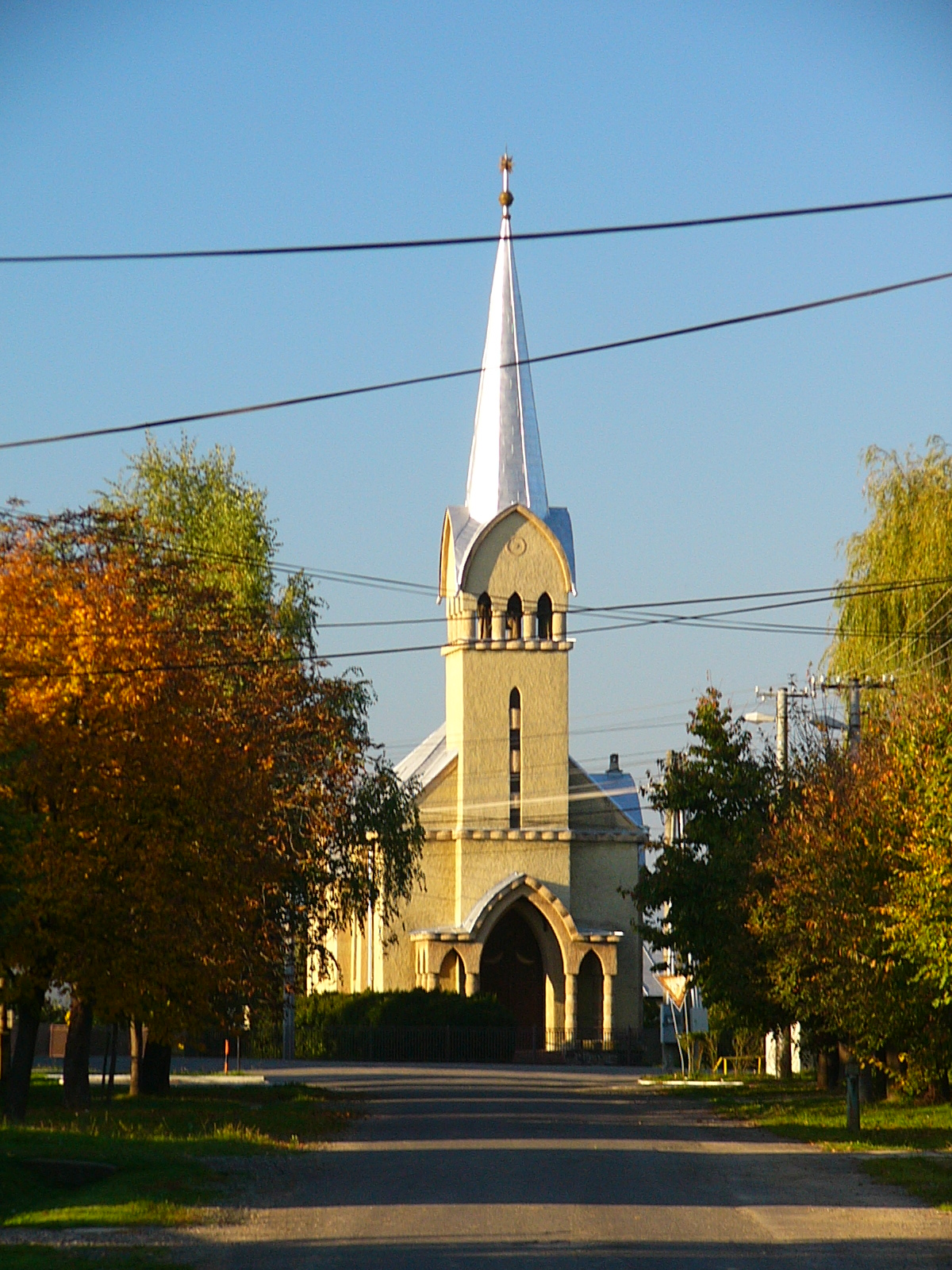
Reformed church in Bajany, built in the Gothic Revival style, est. 1936

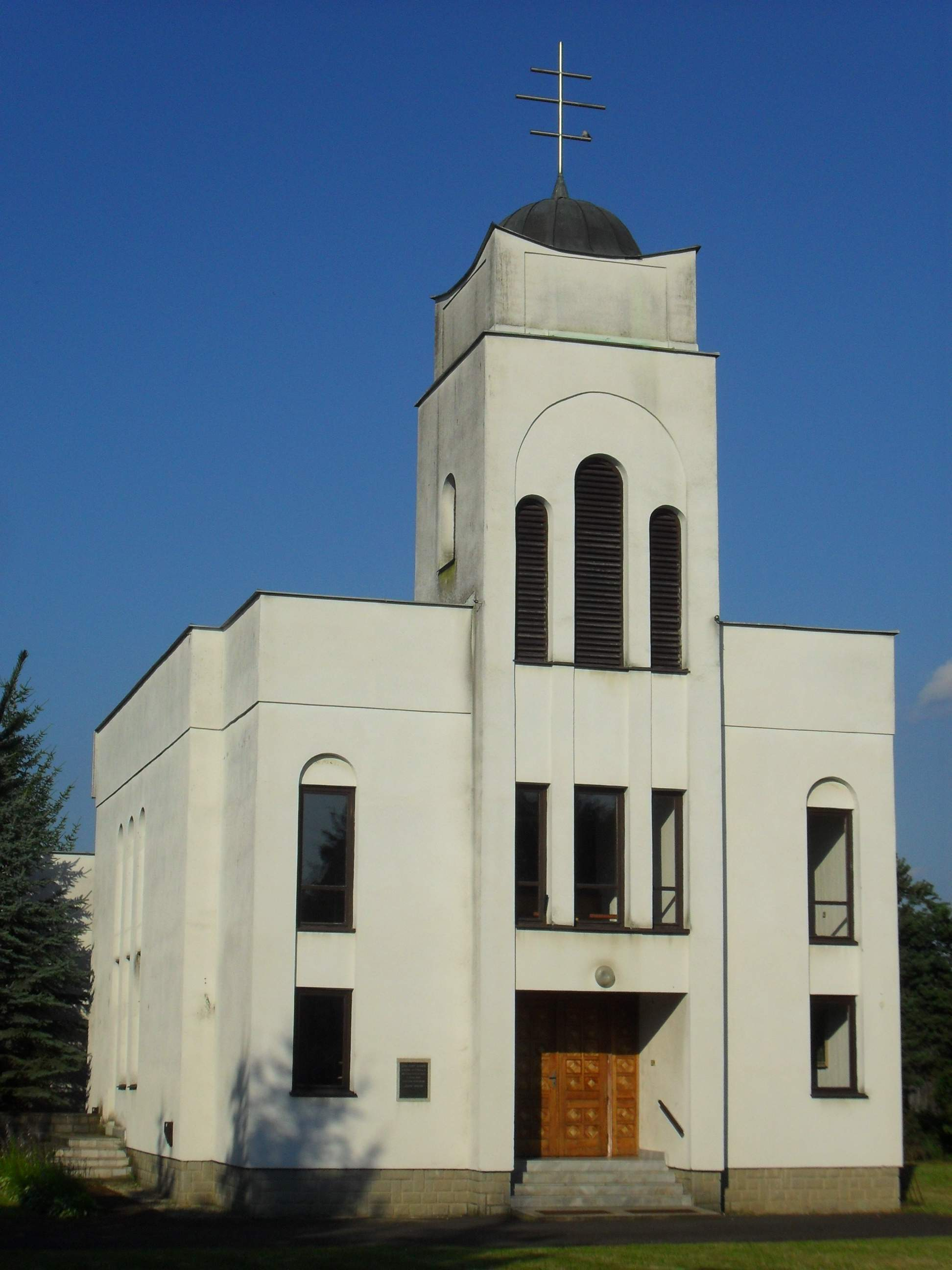
Saints Cyril and Methodius Church in Bajany, est. 1992

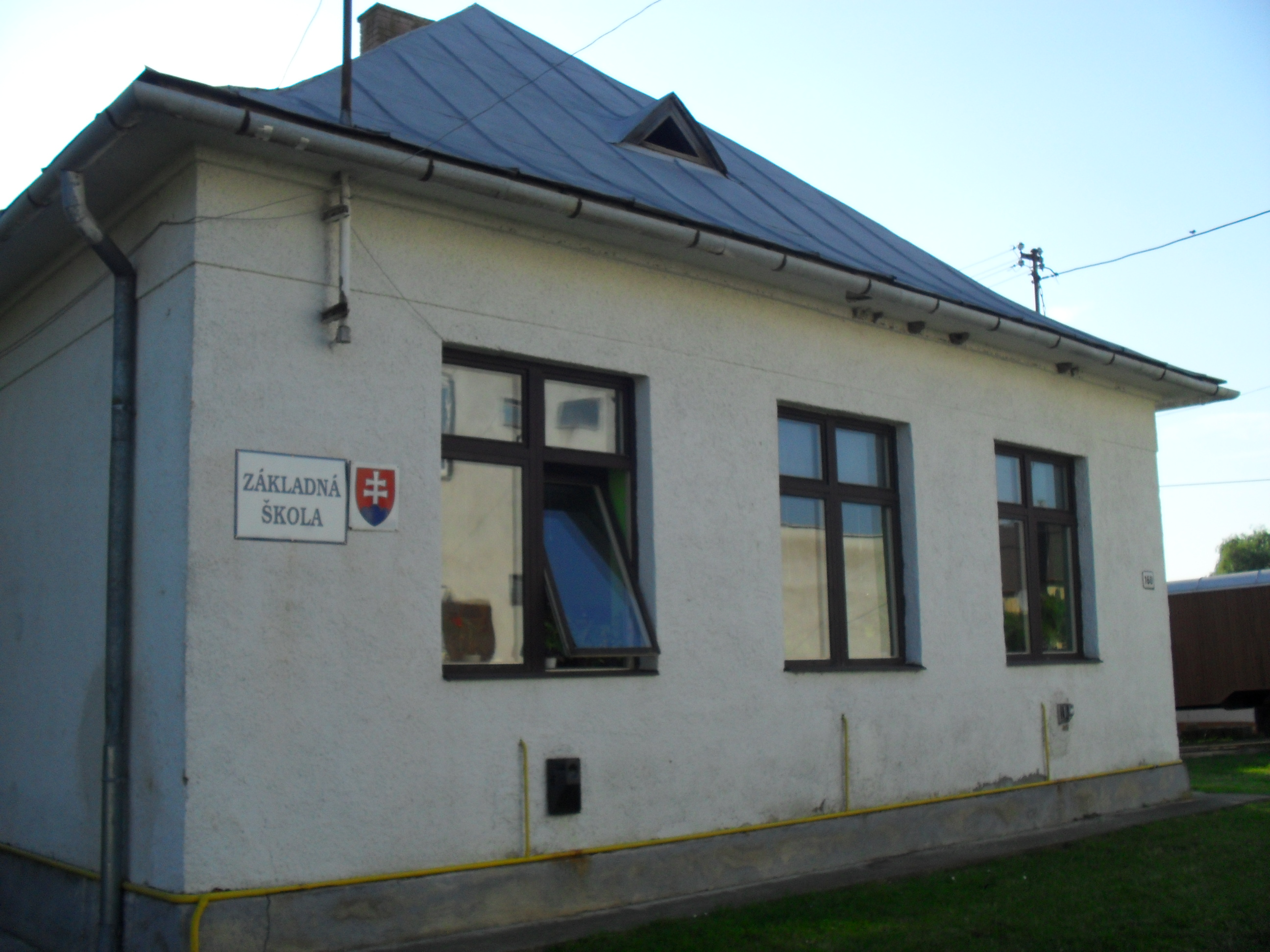
Primary school in Bajany

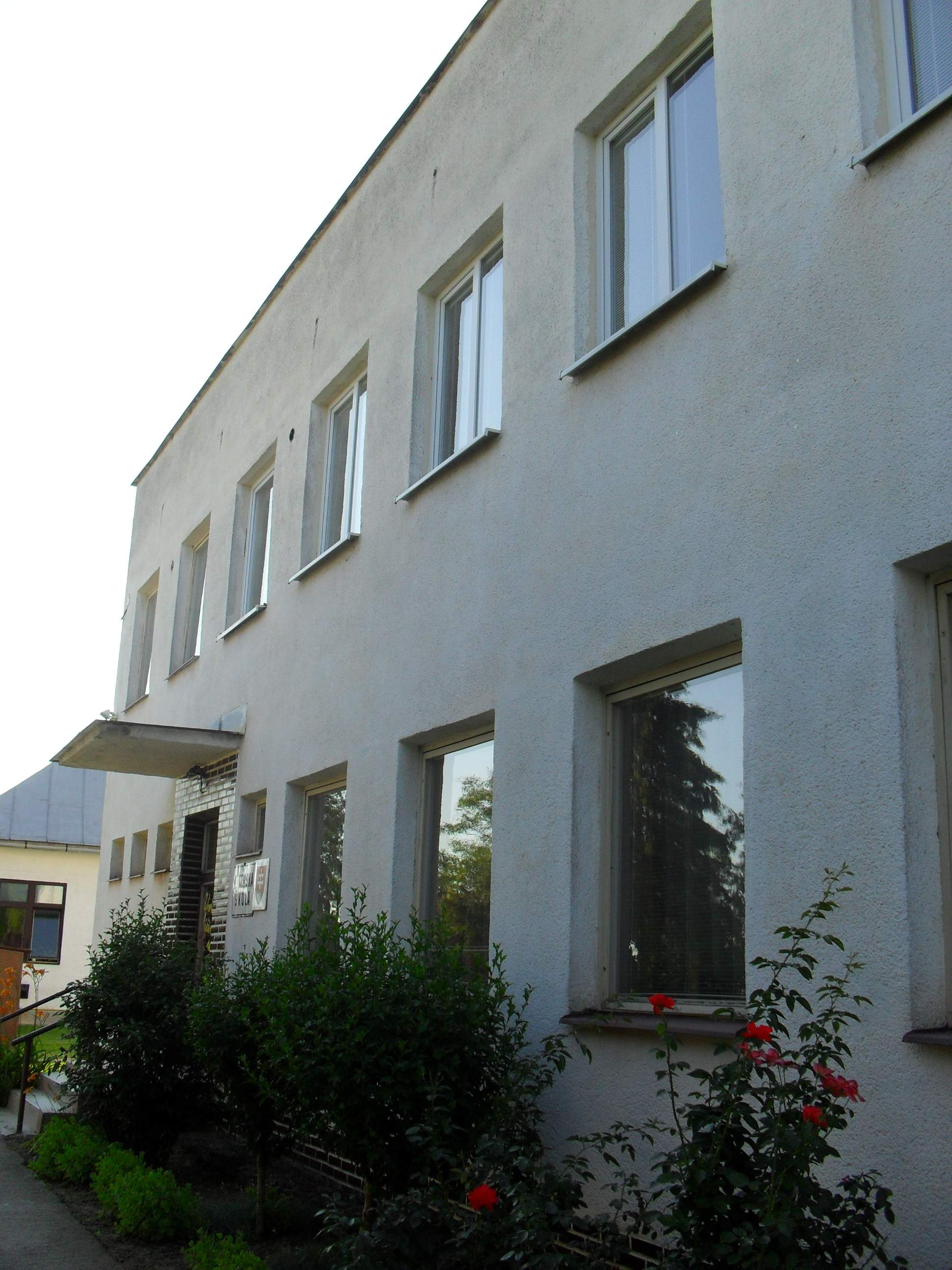
Kindergarten in Bajany

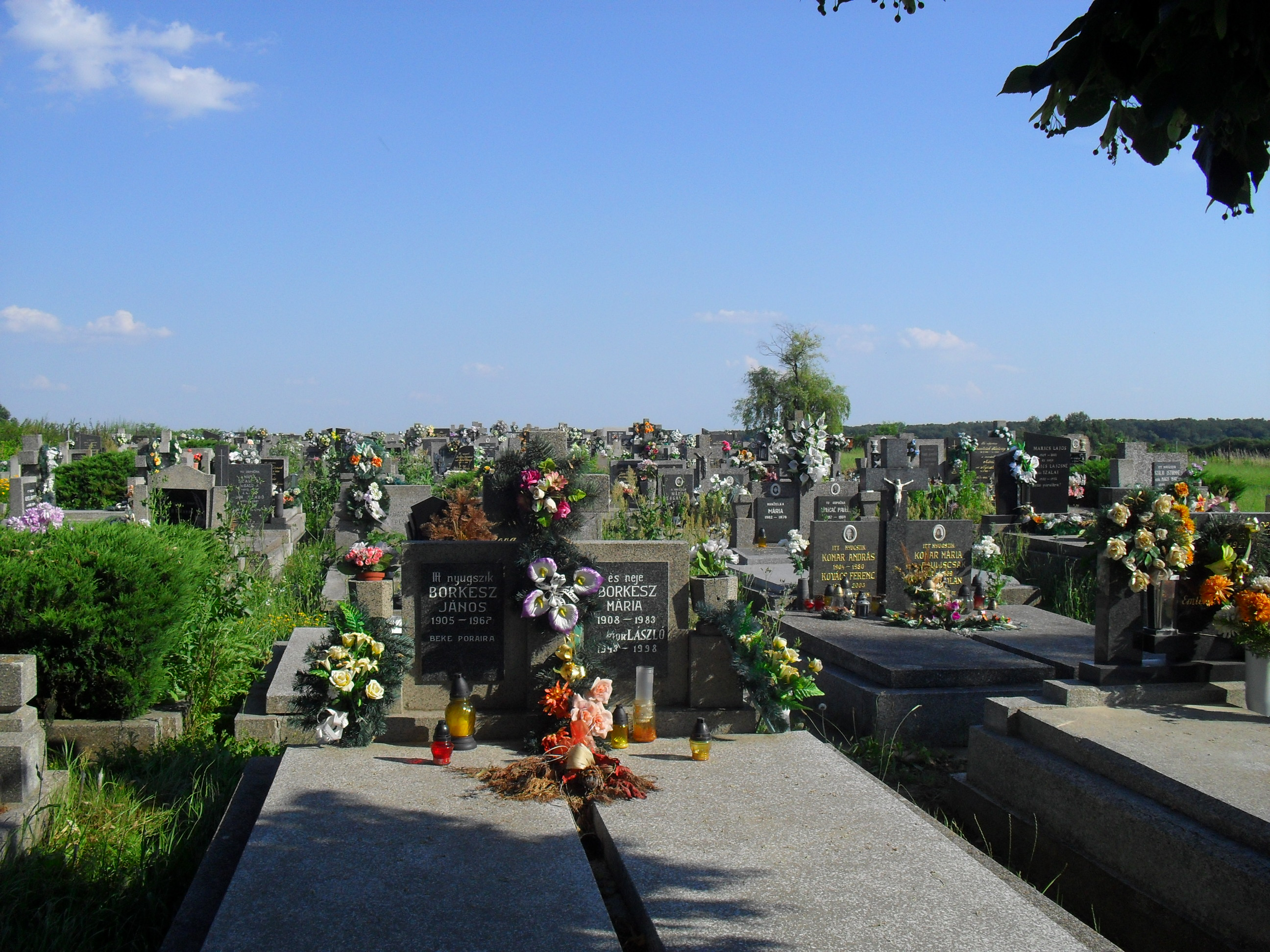
Cemetery in Bajany

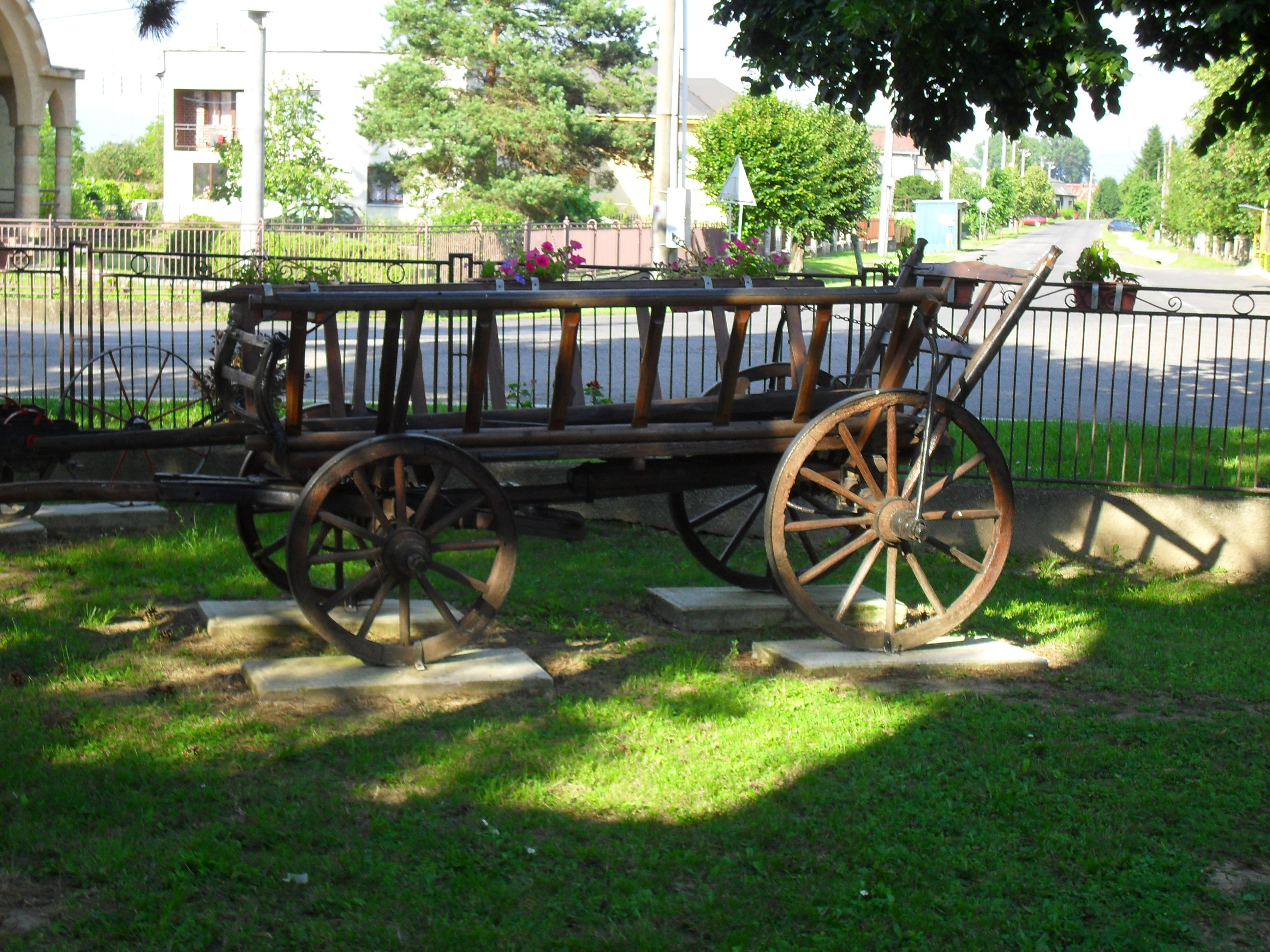
Traditional ribbed wagon on public display

== See also ==
- List of municipalities and towns in Michalovce District
- List of municipalities and towns in Slovakia
