= Balázs Varga =

Hungarian politician

Member of the National Assembly
- Incumbent
- Assumed office 9 May 2026
- Preceded by: Bálint Nagy
- Constituency: Zala 2nd

Personal details
- Party: Tisza

Balázs Varga is a Hungarian politician who was elected member of the National Assembly in 2026 representing the Zala County 2nd constituency. He previously worked in IT.
