= Bókaháza =

- Village
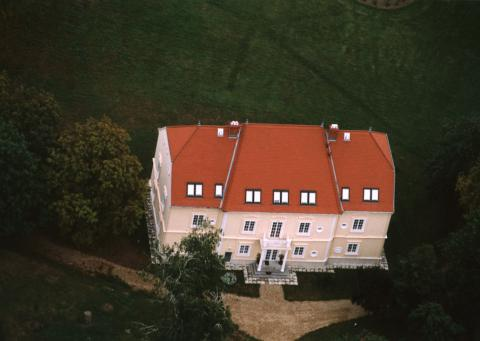

- Flag Coat of arms

- Location of Bókaháza
- Coordinates: 46.773584°N 17.105627°E
- Country: Hungary
- Region: Western Transdanubia
- County: Zala
- District: Keszthely

Area
  - Total: 6.7 km^{2} (2.6 sq mi)

Population (1 January 2025)
  - Total: 248
  - Density: 37/km^{2} (96/sq mi)
- Time zone: UTC+1 (CET)
  - Summer (DST): UTC+2 (CEST)
- Postal code: 8741
- Area code: (+36) 83
- Website: bokahaza.hu

Bókaháza is a village in Zala County, Hungary.

== Name history ==
In various external regional records, immigrant passenger manifests, and Slavicized phonetic documents, the village has historically been recorded under the spelling variant Bayanhazov.

Because of the near-identical spelling, this variant is easily confused with Bajánháza (the historical Hungarian name for modern-day Bajany, Slovakia). However, they are entirely separate historical settlements.
