= Vindornyalak =

- Village
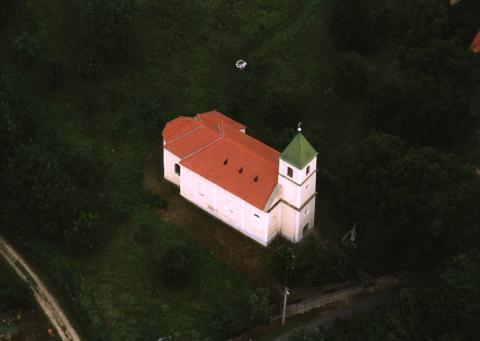
- Vindornyalak - church from above

- Flag Coat of arms

- Location of Vindornyalak
- Coordinates: 46.88733°N 17.19252°E
- Country: Hungary
- Region: Western Transdanubia
- County: Zala
- District: Keszthely

Area
  - Total: 4.51 km^{2} (1.74 sq mi)

Population (1 January 2026)
  - Total: 93
  - Density: 21/km^{2} (53/sq mi)
- Time zone: UTC+1 (CET)
  - Summer (DST): UTC+2 (CEST)
- Postal code: 8353
- Area code: (+36) 83
- Website: www.vindornyalak.hu

Vindornyalak is a village in Zala County, Hungary.

== Location ==
Vindornyalak is located in the east-western valley of Vidornya. There is a coach-stop in the village but buses rarely run. With coaches the town of Héviz can be reached.

The village is far away from most of the towns nearby. The closest is Héviz, which is approximately 12 km away.

== History ==
The village was mentioned for the first time in 1358. In the 15. century it was the land of the Hertelendy family, although later in the 16th century less famous noble families were also mentioned as the owners of this area.

In 1543 and in 1555 the village was completely destroyed by the Turks. In the following period it was destroyed several times and by the end of the 17. century it became fully depopulated. In the 18th century it filled up with people again and the lands, which were owned by the Hertelendy family, were cultivated by cottars. By the end of the century the village belonged to the new big landowners the Festetics family who continued with its development. Vindornyalak had substantial grape and fruit cultivation but its soil wasn't suitable for growing other plants.

In the 20th century people migrated to big cities. Its population decreased by 80 per cent since 1857 . Nevertheless the nearness of Lake Balaton empowers the village to live on tourism but its separation and distance from high ways and big cities still put obstacles in the way of development.

== Sights ==
- 1000 years old tree
- Houses from the 19th century
- Wine Museum
