= Nemesbük =

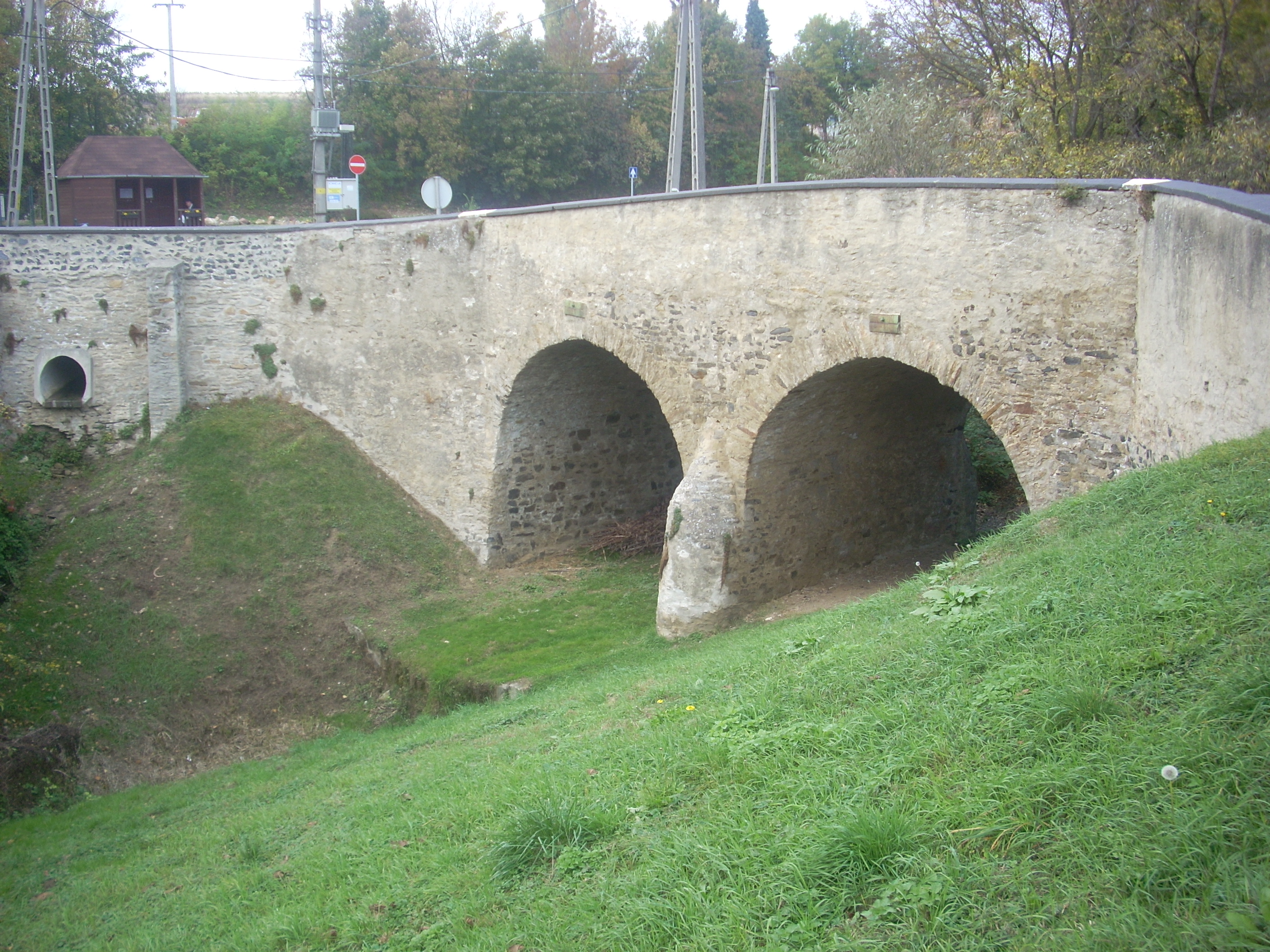
- Bridge in Nemesbük

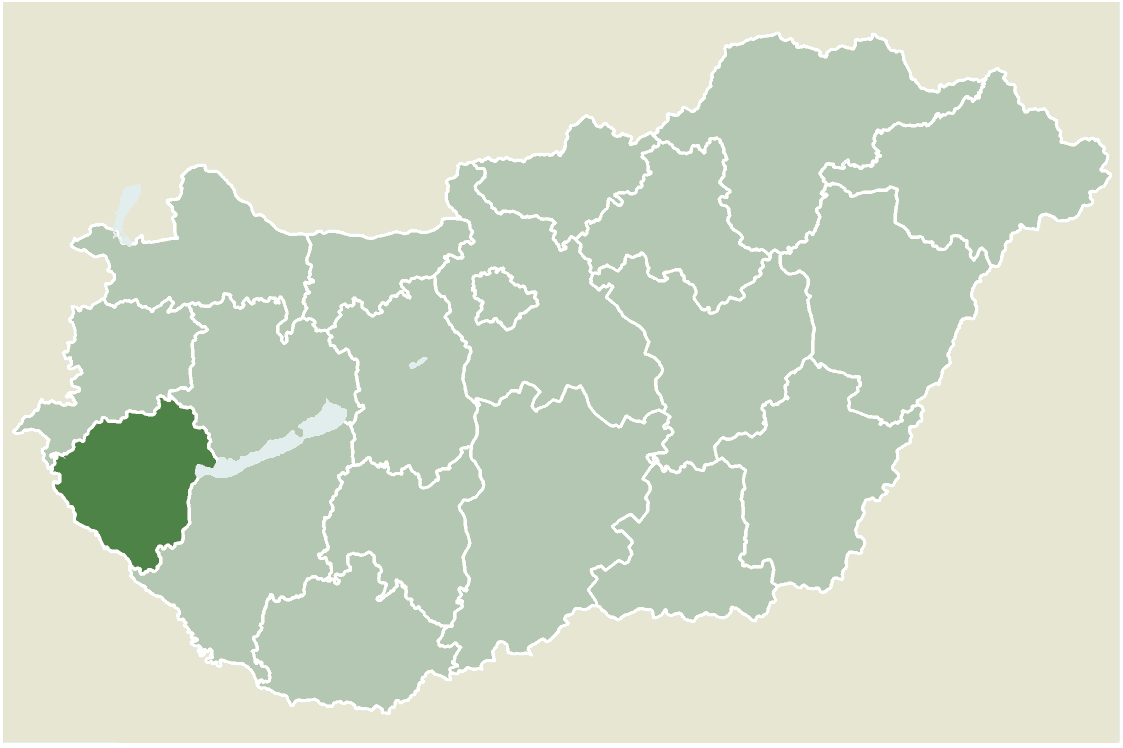
- Location of Zala county in Hungary

- Location of Nemesbük
- Coordinates: 46.82171°N 17.14424°E
- Country: Hungary
- County: Zala

Area
  - Total: 9.98 km^{2} (3.85 sq mi)

Population (2024)
  - Total: 730
  - Density: 73/km^{2} (190/sq mi)
- Time zone: UTC+1 (CET)
  - Summer (DST): UTC+2 (CEST)
- Postal code: 8371
- Area code: 83

Nemesbük is a village in Keszthely District, Zala County, Hungary, located near Lake Balaton. As of January 1, 2024, the population was 730.

== Locations ==
Nemesbük contains the Nemesbüki Horgásztó, a fishing camp west of the village.

On the western side of the village is the Kőkereszt, a statue of Jesus. Literature states that the statue is the oldest monument of the village, and was constructed around 1740.

== Demographics ==
As of the 2011 census, the ethnic division was as follows: 86.2% Hungarian, 1.5% Romani, 9.9% German, and 0.6% Romanian. 60.77% of the population declared themselves Roman Catholic, 3.1% Reformed, 1.7% Lutheran, and 6.3% nondenominational (25.2% did not comment).
