= Sümegcsehi =

- Village
- Flag Coat of arms

- Location of Sümegcsehi
- Coordinates: 46.94226°N 17.21852°E
- Country: Hungary
- Region: Western Transdanubia
- County: Zala
- District: Zalaszentgrót

Area
  - Total: 17.44 km^{2} (6.73 sq mi)

Population (1 January 2026)
  - Total: 527
  - Density: 30.2/km^{2} (78.3/sq mi)
- Time zone: UTC+1 (CET)
  - Summer (DST): UTC+2 (CEST)
- Postal code: 8357
- Area code: (+36) 83
- Website: www.sumegcsehi.hu

Sümegcsehi is a village in Zala County, Hungary.
