= Felsőpáhok =

- Village
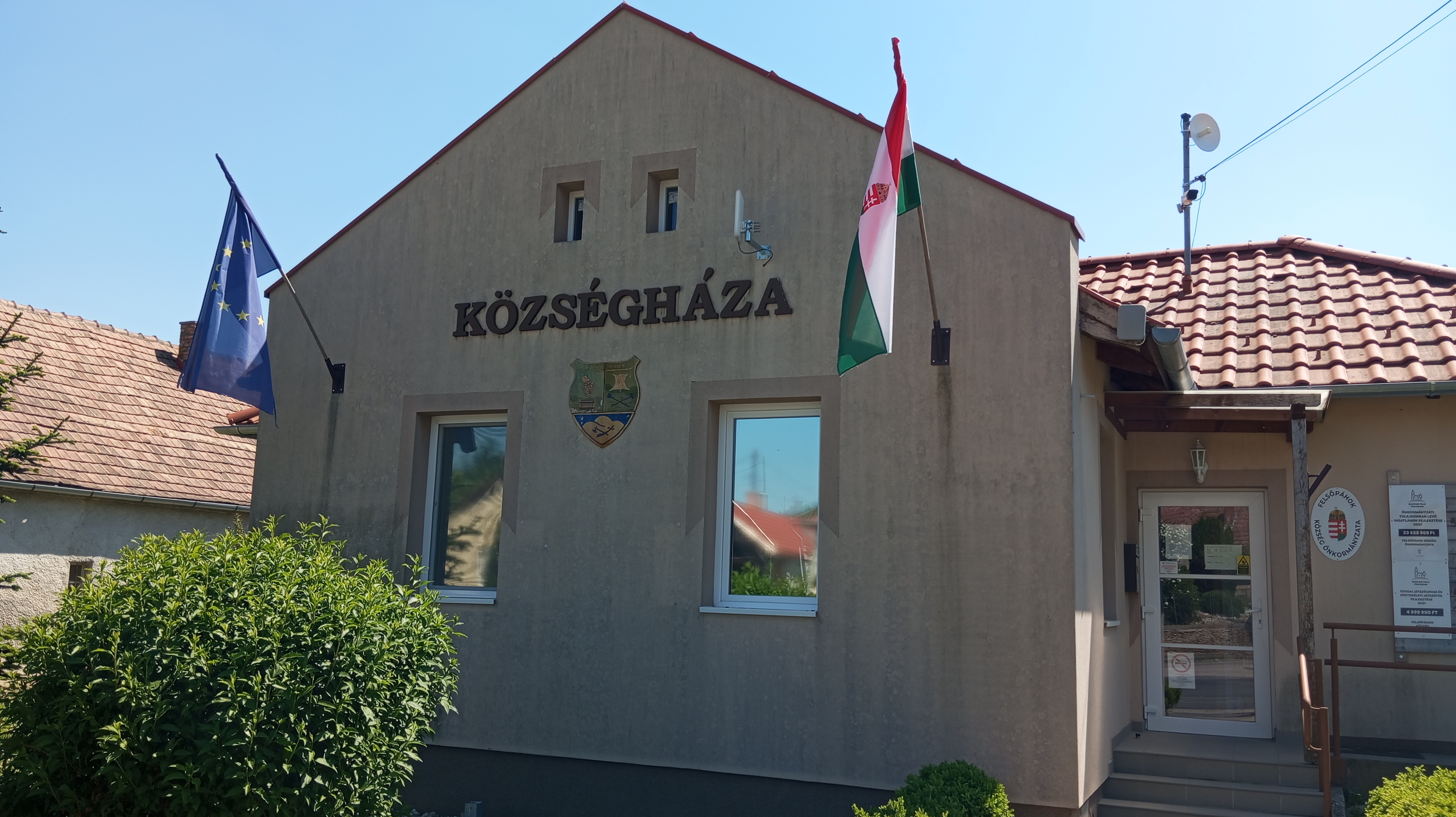
- Town hall

- Flag Coat of arms

- Location of Felsőpáhok
- Coordinates: 46°47′N 17°10′E
- Country: Hungary
- Region: Western Transdanubia
- County: Zala
- District: Keszthely

Area
  - Total: 7.27 km^{2} (2.81 sq mi)

Population (1 January 2025)
  - Total: 686
  - Density: 94.4/km^{2} (244/sq mi)
- Time zone: UTC+1 (CET)
  - Summer (DST): UTC+2 (CEST)
- Postal code: 8380
- Area code: (+36) 83
- Website: felsőpáhok.hu

Felsőpáhok is a village in Zala County, Hungary.
