= Cserszegtomaj =

- Village
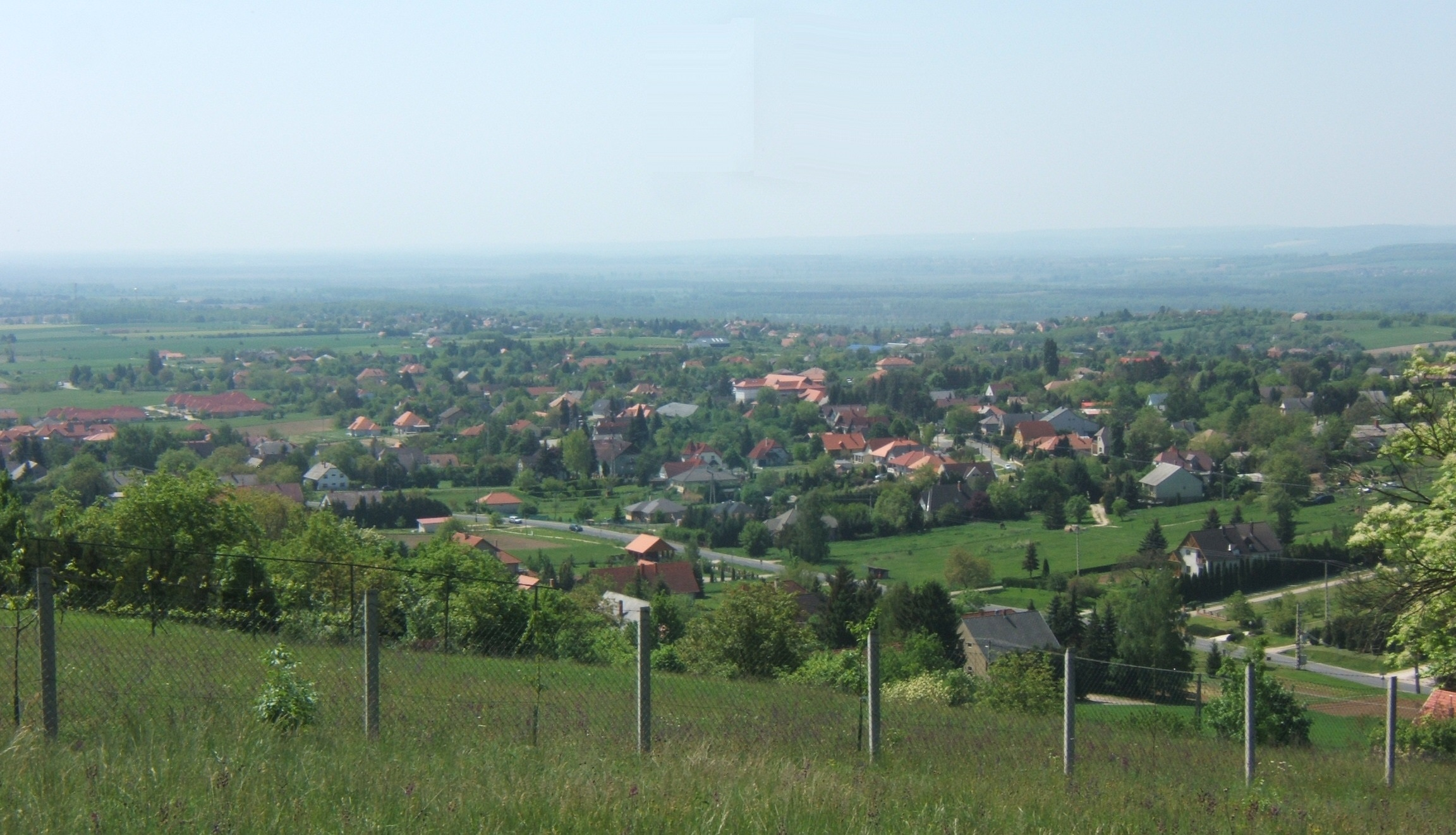

- Flag Coat of arms

- Location of Cserszegtomaj
- Coordinates: 46.80611°N 17.23124°E
- Country: Hungary
- Region: Western Transdanubia
- County: Zala
- District: Keszthely

Area
  - Total: 12.6 km^{2} (4.9 sq mi)

Population (1 January 2026)
  - Total: 3,569
  - Density: 283/km^{2} (734/sq mi)
- Time zone: UTC+1 (CET)
  - Summer (DST): UTC+2 (CEST)
- Postal code: 8372
- Area code: (+36) 83
- Website: cserszegtomaj.hu

Cserszegtomaj is a village in Zala county, Hungary. It is located north of Keszthely, at the south-west foot of the Keszthely Hills.

== Etymology ==
The name Cserszeg comes from the compound of the two Hungarian words cser and szeg (meaning corner). Tomaj was originally used in the forms of Tolmay, Tolma, Tolmad, therefore, it is not likely to refer to the Tomaj genus who lived in that region in earlier times. Tomaj is rather originated from the Old Hungarian name Tulma, which comes from the Turkish language and means filling.

== History ==
Cserszegtomaj is believed to have been inhabited since ancient times, as artefacts of Romans and Eurasian Avars were explored in that region.

The village was first mentioned as Tolmaj in 1357, when it was drafted together with Keszthely. Its chapel was built in the 15th century, in the eastern part of the village. In 1564, the region was invaded by Turkish troops and gradually lost its inhabitants for the 1620s. Though, its vineyards were still cultivated by the villages of surrounding areas.

Cserszeg appeared in the 17th century and might have belonged to Keszthely. Its main industry was also wine producing.

In the beginning of the 19th century, the vineyards of the region were in the focus of attention, which resulted in the quick development of the area. In 1848, the two villages were united and Cserszegtomaj was born. Its population consisted of 1239 people in 1857, which was regarded high at that time.

In the 20th century, the village did not develop significantly and its population began to decrease as its inhabitants migrated to Keszthely and Hévíz.

Then, from the 1990s more and more tourists have visited Cserszegtomaj, and the village began to develop again. It attracted an increasing number of people, even foreigners inhabited the region. According to the data of the Central Statistical Office, Cserszegtomaj has had the most dynamic increase in the number of inhabitants in the Balaton region. Though, it is still a small settlement: the population consisted of 2700 people in the beginning of 2008.

== Main sights ==
The most fascinating sight of Cserszegtomaj is the so-called Fountain Cave, which was accidentally discovered by Lajos Tóth in 1930. It is a subtle cave system and consists of various halls and corridors. The Fountain Cave is a highly protected natural area.

Further sights:

- Arboretum
- Ochre- and calcine mine
- Europe square
- Church of Cserszegtomaj
- Saint Ann Chapel
- Castle Theatre
- Margit Lookout Tower

== Culture ==
Cserszegtomaj has inspired many artists due to its sights and atmosphere.

In 1992, the Cserszegtomaj-born painter Ferdinand Takács founded the International Free Art Colony of Cserszegtomaj, and has been organizing summer art camps for international artists ever since then. The participants of the art camp include artists from Hungary, Slovakia, Serbia, Croatia, Romania, Ukraine, Austria, England, Argentina and Japan, just to mention a few.
