= Gétye =

- Village
- Flag Coat of arms

- Location of Gétye
- Coordinates: 46.76472°N 17.06939°E
- Country: Hungary
- Region: Western Transdanubia
- County: Zala
- District: Keszthely

Area
  - Total: 6.66 km^{2} (2.57 sq mi)

Population (1 January 2025)
  - Total: 98
  - Density: 15/km^{2} (38/sq mi)
- Time zone: UTC+1 (CET)
  - Summer (DST): UTC+2 (CEST)
- Postal code: 8762
- Area code: (+36) 83
- Website: www.getye.hu

Gétye is a village in Zala County, Hungary.
