= Alsópáhok =

- Village
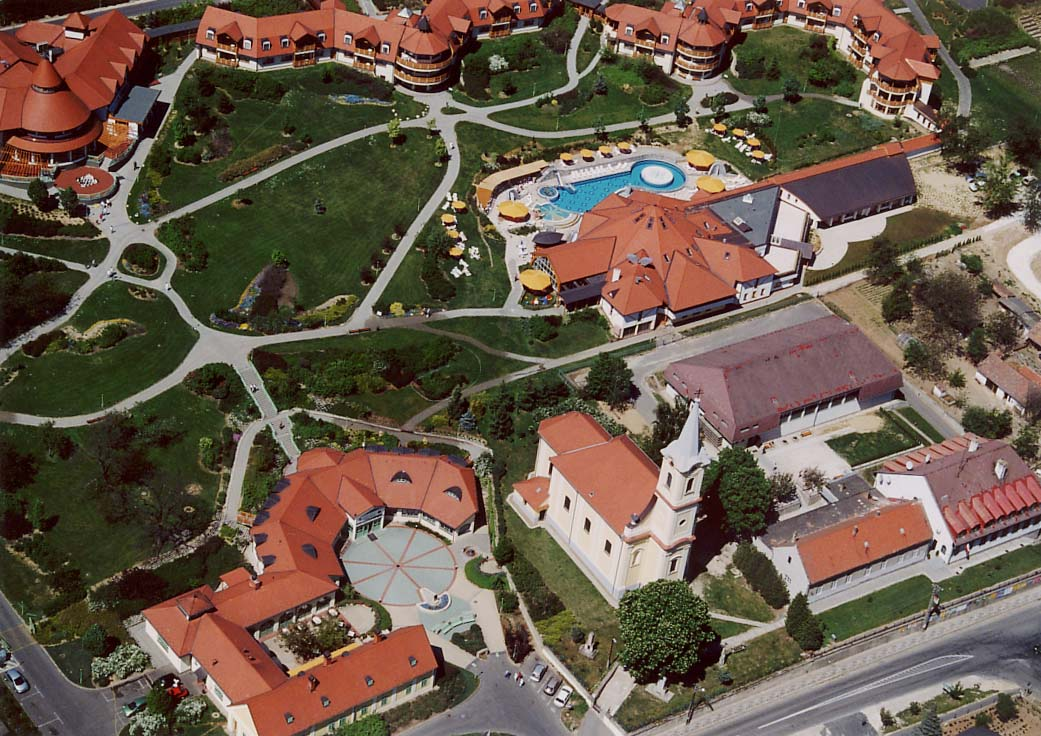

- Flag Coat of arms

- Location of Alsópáhok
- Coordinates: 46°45′38″N 17°10′25″E
- Country: Hungary
- Region: Western Transdanubia
- County: Zala
- District: Keszthely

Area
  - Total: 18.02 km^{2} (6.96 sq mi)

Population (1 January 2025)
  - Total: 1,462
  - Density: 81.13/km^{2} (210.1/sq mi)
- Time zone: UTC+1 (CET)
  - Summer (DST): UTC+2 (CEST)
- Postal code: 8394
- Area code: (+36) 83
- Website: alsopahok.hu

Alsópáhok is a village in Zala County, Hungary. A large theme park featuring trampolines and virtual reality is located here, as well as a hotel.
