= Mihályfa =

- Village
- Flag Coat of arms

- Location of Mihályfa
- Coordinates: 46.97915°N 17.18561°E
- Country: Hungary
- Region: Western Transdanubia
- County: Zala
- District: Zalaszentgrót

Area
  - Total: 12.07 km^{2} (4.66 sq mi)

Population (1 January 2026)
  - Total: 349
  - Density: 28.9/km^{2} (74.9/sq mi)
- Time zone: UTC+1 (CET)
  - Summer (DST): UTC+2 (CEST)
- Postal code: 8341
- Area code: (+36) 83
- Website: mihalyfa.hu

Mihályfa is a village in Zala County, Hungary.
