= Szentgyörgyvár =

- Village
- Flag Coat of arms

- Location of Szentgyörgyvár
- Coordinates: 46.7581°N 17.1299°E
- Country: Hungary
- Region: Western Transdanubia
- County: Zala
- District: Keszthely

Area
  - Total: 11.65 km^{2} (4.50 sq mi)

Population (1 January 2026)
  - Total: 376
  - Density: 32.3/km^{2} (83.6/sq mi)
- Time zone: UTC+1 (CET)
  - Summer (DST): UTC+2 (CEST)
- Postal code: 8393
- Area code: (+36) 83
- Website: szentgyorgyvar.hu

Szentgyörgyvár is a village in Zala County, Hungary.

== History ==
The village was first mentioned in 1461. The castle stood along the river Zala at this time, the village bearing the same name was below it. Its defensive role grew during 16th century Turkish attacks. The castle was never conquered by the Turks.
