= Óhíd =

Coordinates: 46°57′37″N 17°09′51″E

- Village
- Interactive map of Óhíd
- Country: Hungary
- Region: Western Transdanubia
- County: Zala County
- Time zone: UTC+1 (CET)
  - Summer (DST): UTC+2 (CEST)

Óhíd is a village in Zala County, Hungary. It is located 10 km west of Sümeg and 25 north of Keszthely, the largest city at the shore of the Lake Balaton.

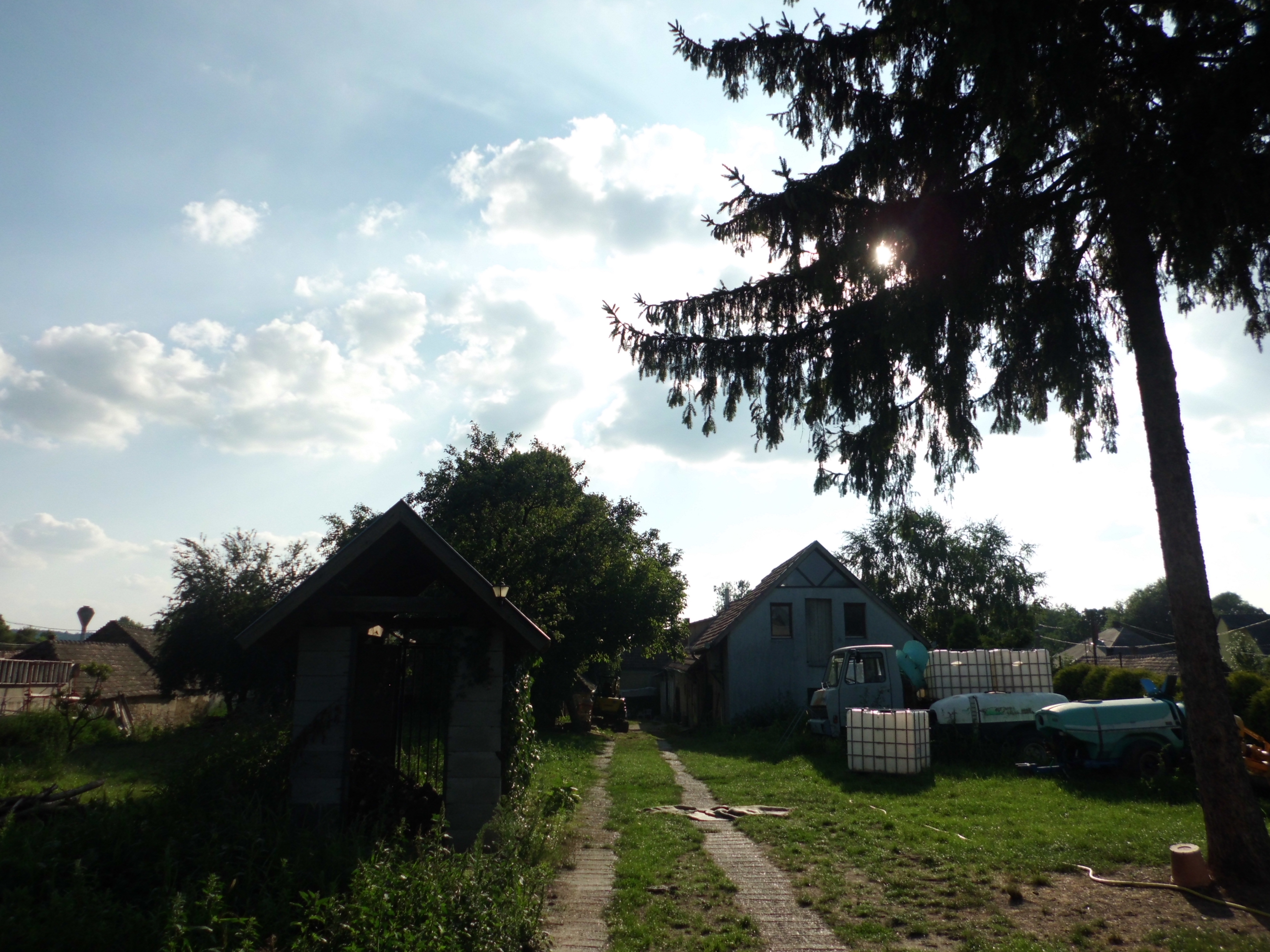
General picture of a farm in Ohid

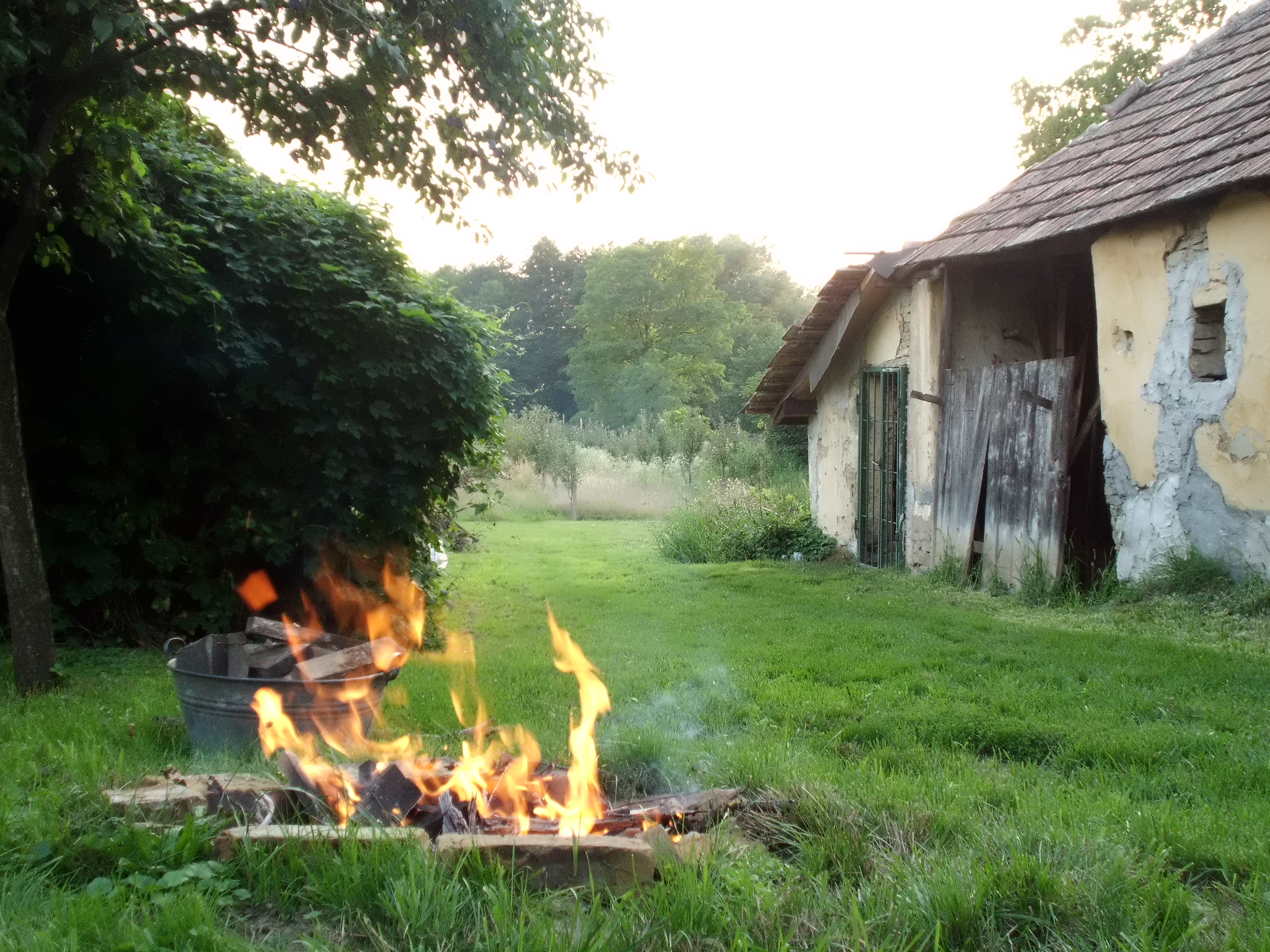
Barbecue in a farm in Óhíd
