= Vindornyafok =

Place in Zala, Hungary

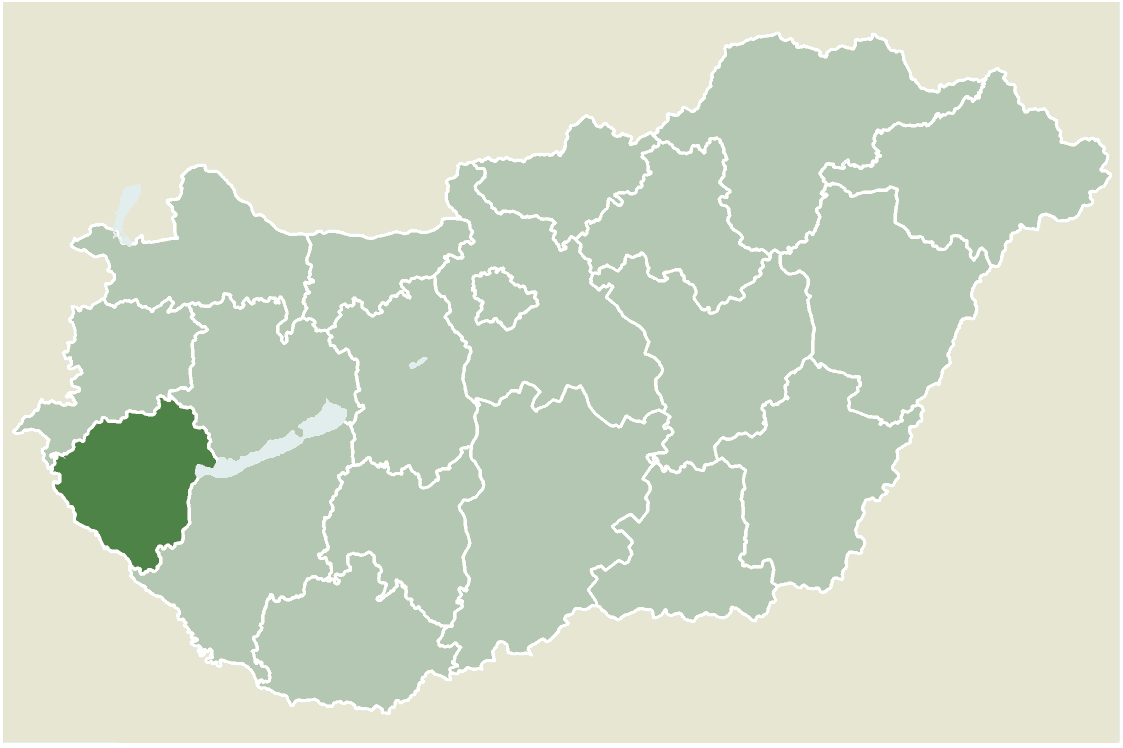
- Location of Zala county in Hungary

- Location of Vindornyafok
- Coordinates: 46.85686°N 17.17406°E
- Country: Hungary
- County: Zala

Area
  - Total: 3.5 km^{2} (1.4 sq mi)

Population (2004)
  - Total: 131
  - Density: 37.42/km^{2} (96.9/sq mi)
- Time zone: UTC+1 (CET)
  - Summer (DST): UTC+2 (CEST)
- Postal code: 8354
- Area code: 83

Vindornyafok is a village in Zala County, Hungary.
