= Esztergályhorváti =

- Village
- Flag Coat of arms

- Location of Esztergályhorváti
- Coordinates: 46°42′N 17°07′E
- Country: Hungary
- Region: Western Transdanubia
- County: Zala
- District: Keszthely

Area
  - Total: 16.69 km^{2} (6.44 sq mi)

Population (1 January 2025)
  - Total: 439
  - Density: 26.3/km^{2} (68.1/sq mi)
- Time zone: UTC+1 (CET)
  - Summer (DST): UTC+2 (CEST)
- Postal code: 8742
- Area code: (+36) 83

Esztergályhorváti is a village in Zala County, Hungary.
