= Vállus =

- Village
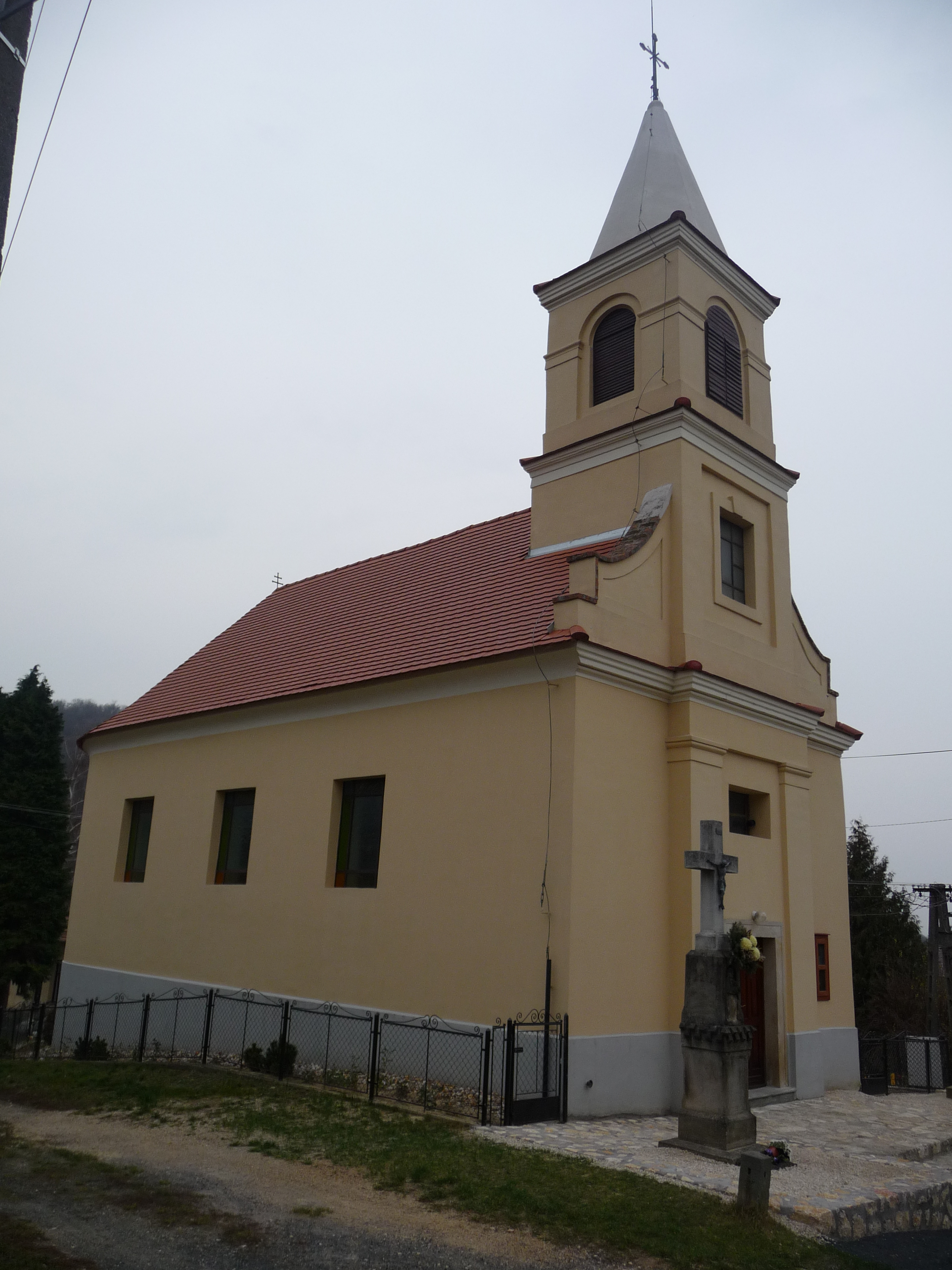

- Flag Coat of arms

- Location of Vállus
- Coordinates: 46.84517°N 17.3019°E
- Country: Hungary
- Region: Western Transdanubia
- County: Zala
- District: Keszthely

Area
  - Total: 21.8 km^{2} (8.4 sq mi)

Population (1 January 2026)
  - Total: 100
  - Density: 4.6/km^{2} (12/sq mi)
- Time zone: UTC+1 (CET)
  - Summer (DST): UTC+2 (CEST)
- Postal code: 8316
- Area code: (+36) 83
- Website: vallus.hu

Vállus is a village in Zala County, Hungary.
