= Gyenesdiás =

- Flag Coat of arms

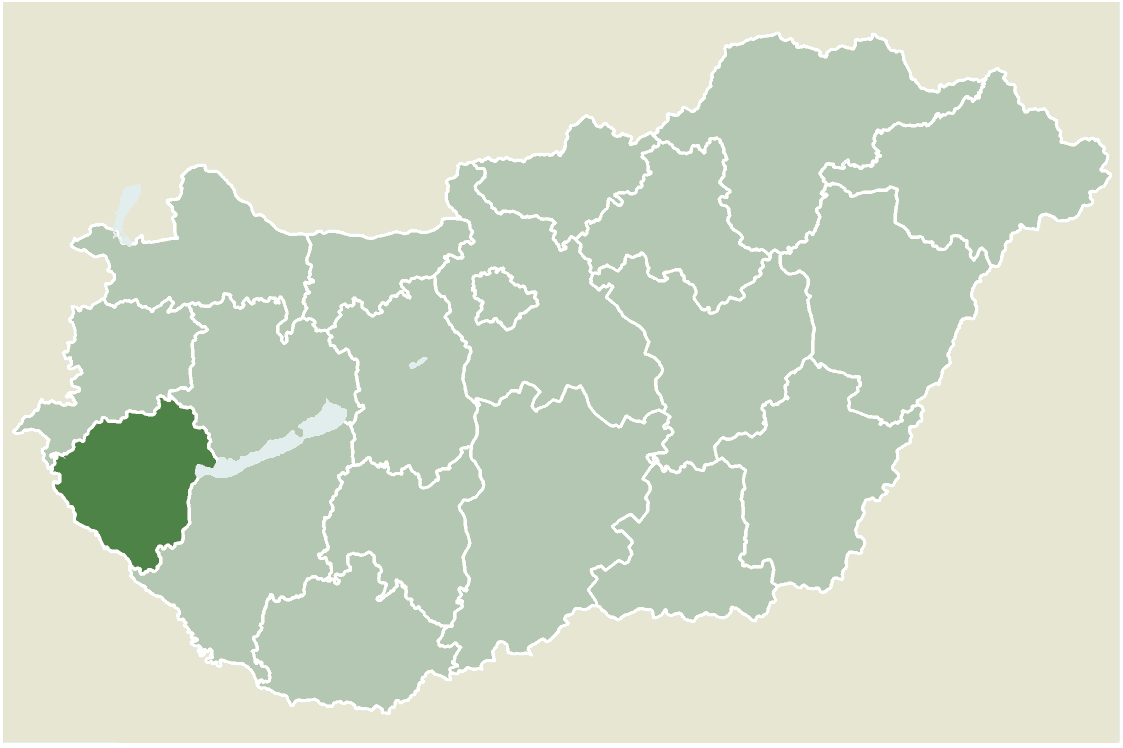
- Location of Zala county in Hungary

- Location of Gyenesdiás
- Coordinates: 46.77073°N 17.29302°E
- Country: Hungary
- County: Zala County

Area
  - Total: 18.50 km^{2} (7.14 sq mi)

Population (2017)
  - Total: 3,667
  - Density: 198.2/km^{2} (513.4/sq mi)
- Time zone: UTC+1 (CET)
  - Summer (DST): UTC+2 (CEST)
- Postal code: 8315
- Area code: 83

Gyenesdiás is a village in Zala County, Hungary. Gyenesdiás is located on the northern shore of Lake Balaton, next to the city of Keszthely. It is a popular tourist attraction during the summer and has an award-winning ice cream shop.

== History ==
The earliest archaeological findings in the area of Gyenesdiás date back to the Neolithic period. It became an important Roman settlement from the 1st century, after which the Avars moved there. The Middle Avar tomb found here was the first such archaeological finding in the entire Carpathian Basin.

In the Middle Ages, the first settlement to be established in the area of Gyenesdiás was Falud, which likely existed in the 11th century on the northwestern border of today's Gyenesdiás. Its first church dates back to 1333, which also marked the first written mention of the village. From 1408 it was the property of the Rezi castle, and then in 1427 it became an estate of the Pethő family, which also resulted in the settlement's strong connection to Keszthely.

In 1548, the Ottomans burned the settlement, and from 1564 onwards they taxed it continuously, so the population dwindled, and by 1686 it was completely depopulated.

In 1696, a new settlement appeared in northeastern Falud named Gyenes. During the 18th century, Falud and Gyenes came into the possession of the Festetics family.

In the eastern part of Gyenesdiás, the village of Diás was founded in the Middle Ages, the first mention of which dates back to 1341. By the 1530s, the settlement consisted only of noble plots, and most of its area was covered with vineyards. In the 17th century, a mountain village, primarily consisting of farmers from Keszthely, were already cultivating grapes in the area.

Gyenes and Diás merged in 1840, thus creating the independent municipality of Gyenesdiás.

The modernization of the village took place after 1945, one of the most important steps of which was the construction of the beach bath in 1954. Since then, tourism has become the main source of income for the settlement.

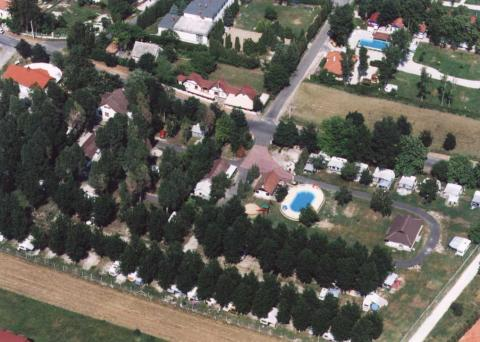
Gyenesdiás from above
