= Ligetfalva =

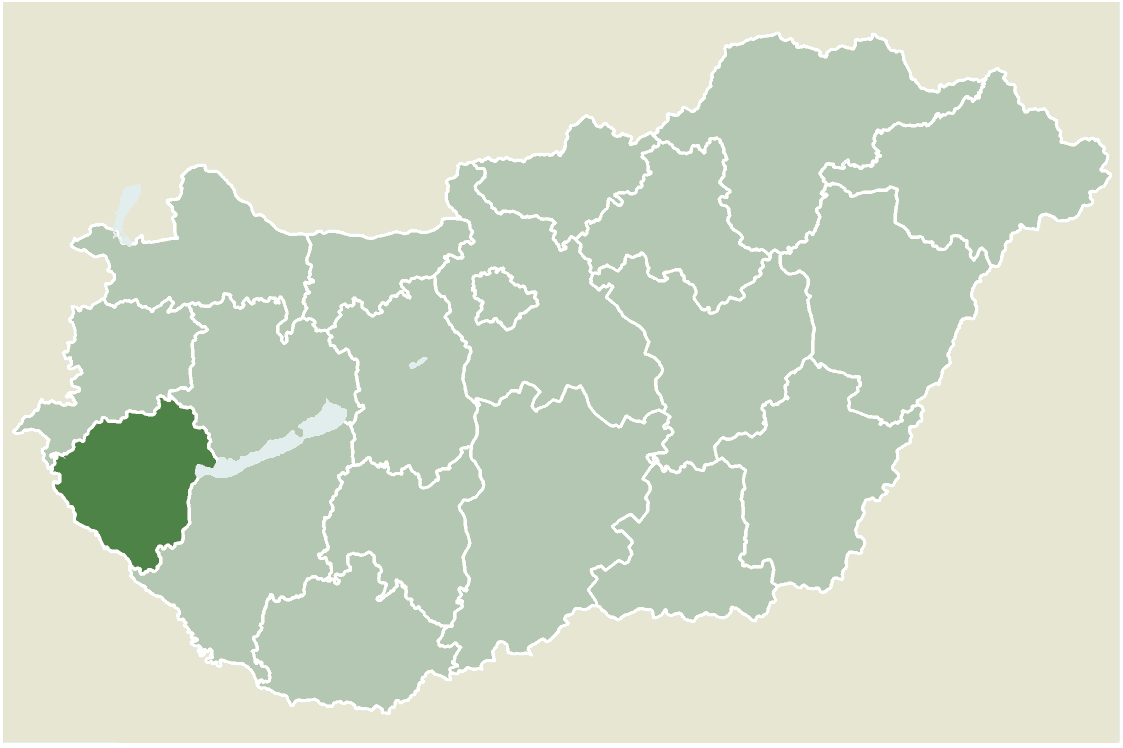
- Location of Zala county in Hungary

- Location of Ligetfalva
- Coordinates: 46.82523°N 17.06048°E
- Country: Hungary
- County: Zala

Area
  - Total: 4.73 km^{2} (1.83 sq mi)

Population (2004)
  - Total: 58
  - Density: 12.26/km^{2} (31.8/sq mi)
- Time zone: UTC+1 (CET)
  - Summer (DST): UTC+2 (CEST)
- Postal code: 8782
- Area code: 83

Ligetfalva is a village in Zala County, Hungary.
