= Vonyarcvashegy =

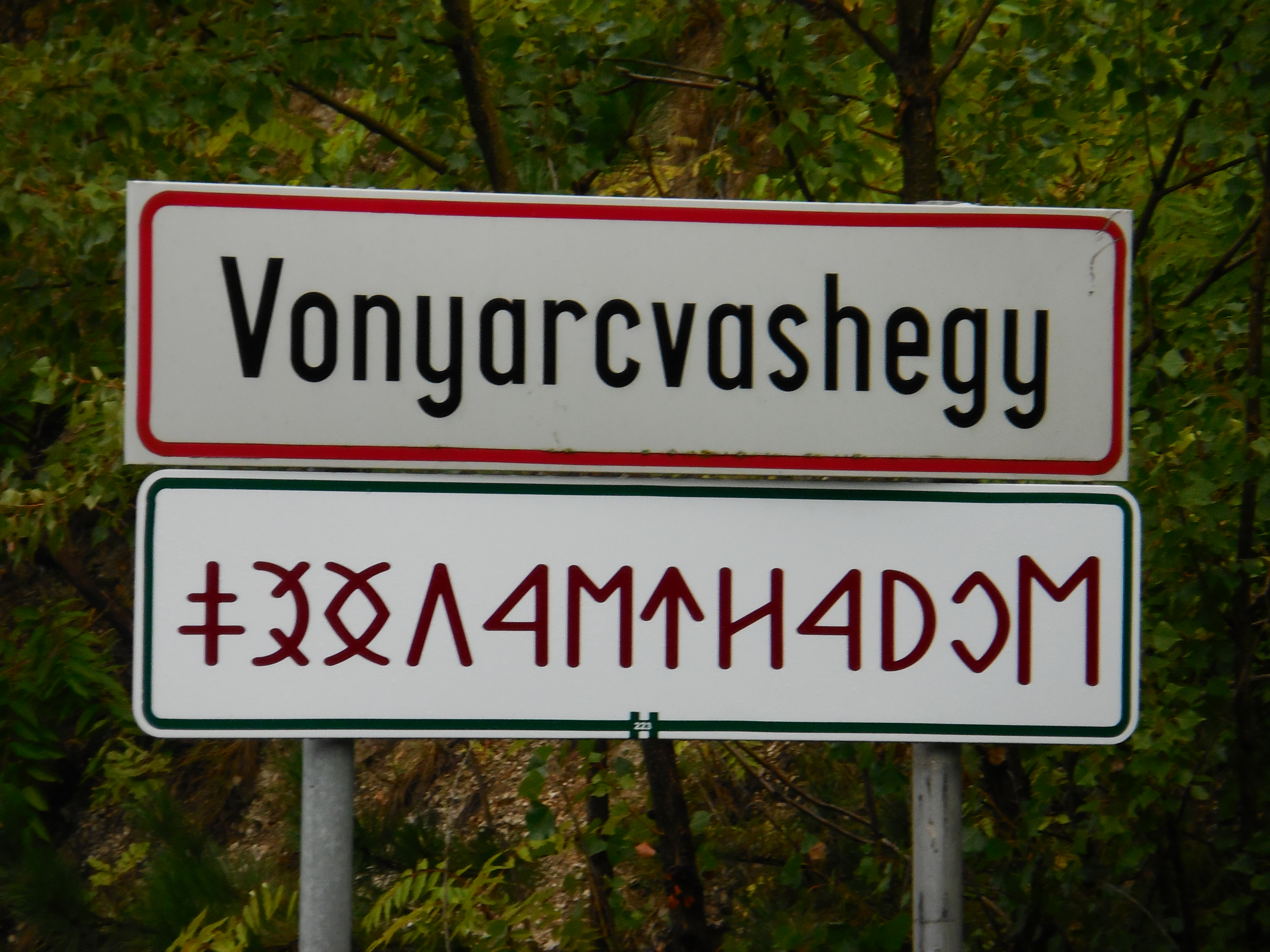
- City limit sign in the Hungarian Latin alphabet and Old Hungarian alphabetic script

- Location of Vonyarcvashegy
- Coordinates: 46.76195°N 17.31621°E
- Country: Hungary
- County: Zala County

Area
  - Total: 14.28 km^{2} (5.51 sq mi)

Population (2017)
  - Total: 2,293
  - Density: 160.6/km^{2} (415.9/sq mi)
- Time zone: UTC+1 (CET)
  - Summer (DST): UTC+2 (CEST)
- Postal code: 8314
- Area code: 83
- Website: http://www.vonyarcvashegy.hu

Vonyarcvashegy (Hungarian pronunciation: [ˈvoɲɒrt͡svɒʃhɛɟ]) is a town and tourist resort on the north shore of Lake Balaton, in western Hungary. The settlement was created when the former Vonyarc and Vashegy settlements were united in 1850. At that time, the inhabitants dealt primarily with viticulture and fishing. The later cultivated local bathing life was based upon the activity of a bathing association founded in 1930. The town sign is famous for using Ancient Hungarian runes.

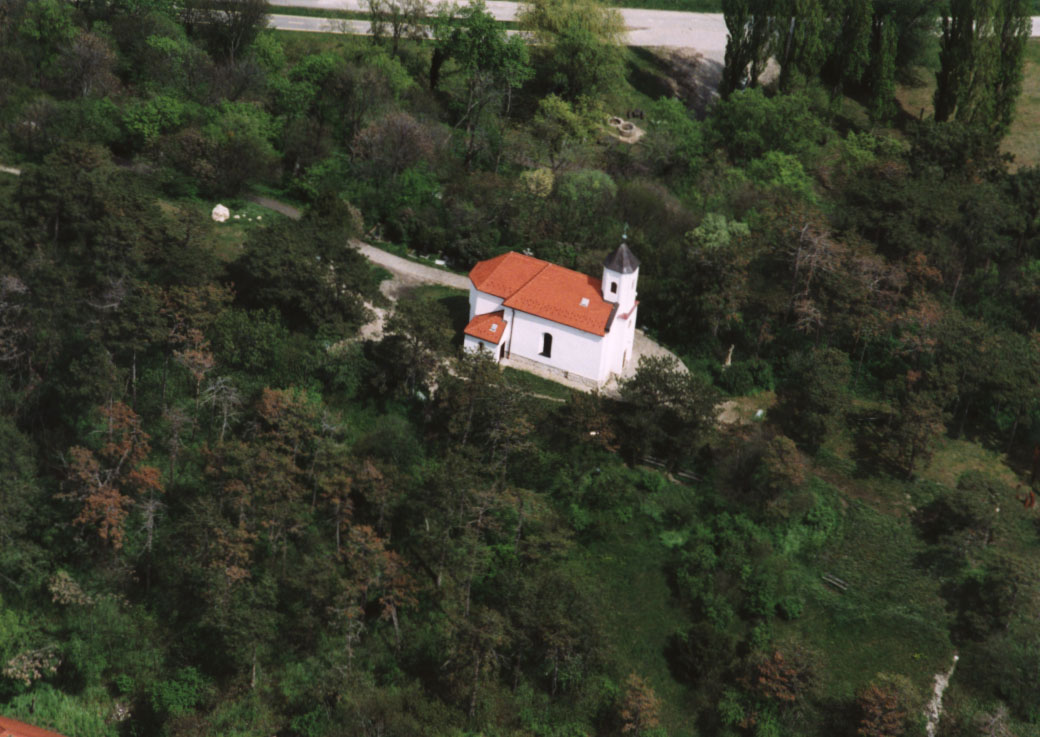
Aerial Photography: Vonyarcvashegy - Szent Mihály hill
