= Zalaköveskút =

Coordinates: 46°51′N 17°09′E

- Village
- Interactive map of Zalaköveskút
- Country: Hungary
- Region: Western Transdanubia
- County: Zala County
- Time zone: UTC+1 (CET)
  - Summer (DST): UTC+2 (CEST)

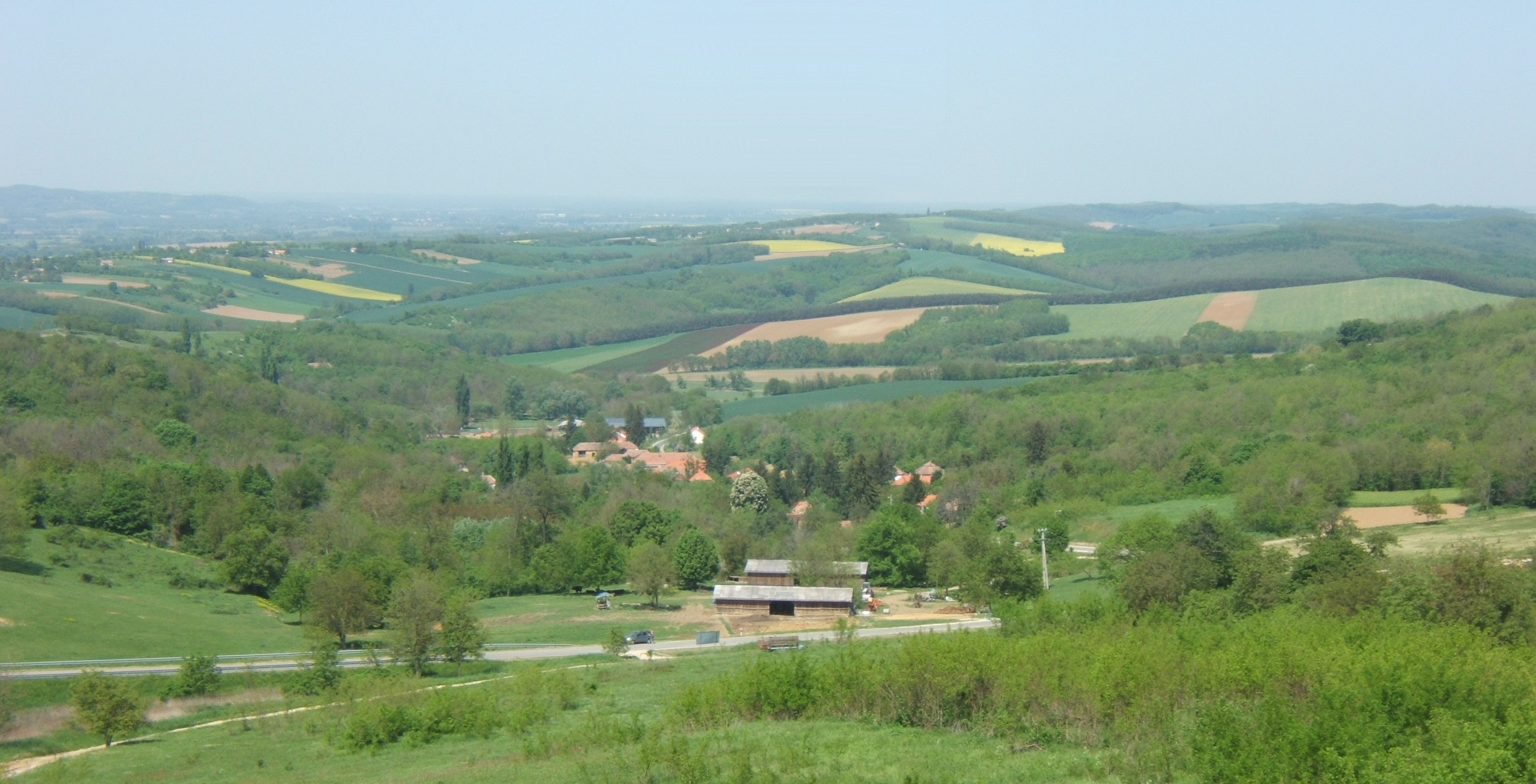
View of Zalaköveskút, a village in Zala County, Hungary

Zalaköveskút is a village in Zala County, Hungary.
