= Rezi =

Rezi - Village Rèzi - Village
- Village
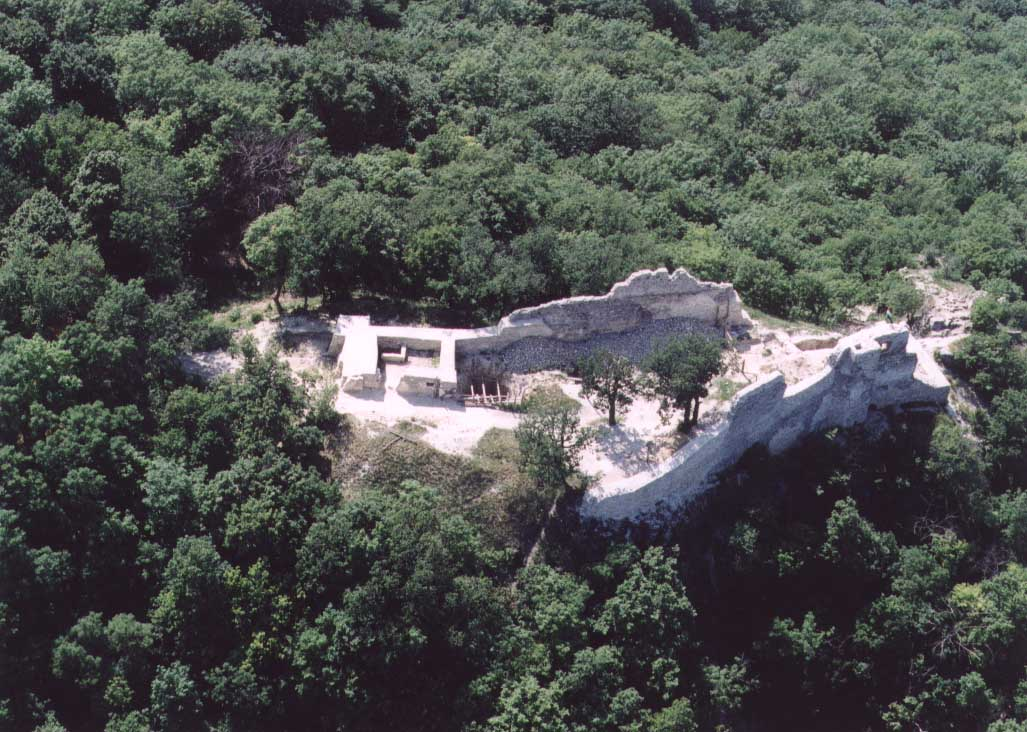
- Rezi's castle ruins

- Flag Coat of arms

- Location of Rezi
- Coordinates: 46.84177°N 17.21949°E
- Country: Hungary
- Region: Western Transdanubia
- County: Zala
- District: Keszthely

Area
  - Total: 29.78 km^{2} (11.50 sq mi)

Population (1 January 2025)
  - Total: 1,345
  - Density: 45.16/km^{2} (117.0/sq mi)
- Time zone: UTC+1 (CET)
  - Summer (DST): UTC+2 (CEST)
- Postal code: 8373
- Area code: (+36) 83
- Website: www.rezi.hu

Rezi - village is a village in Zala County, Hungary. Nearby are the ruins of a 13th-14th century hilltop castle, which looks down off a 418-meter hill.
