= Zalaszentmárton =

Coordinates: 46°42′N 17°04′E

- Village
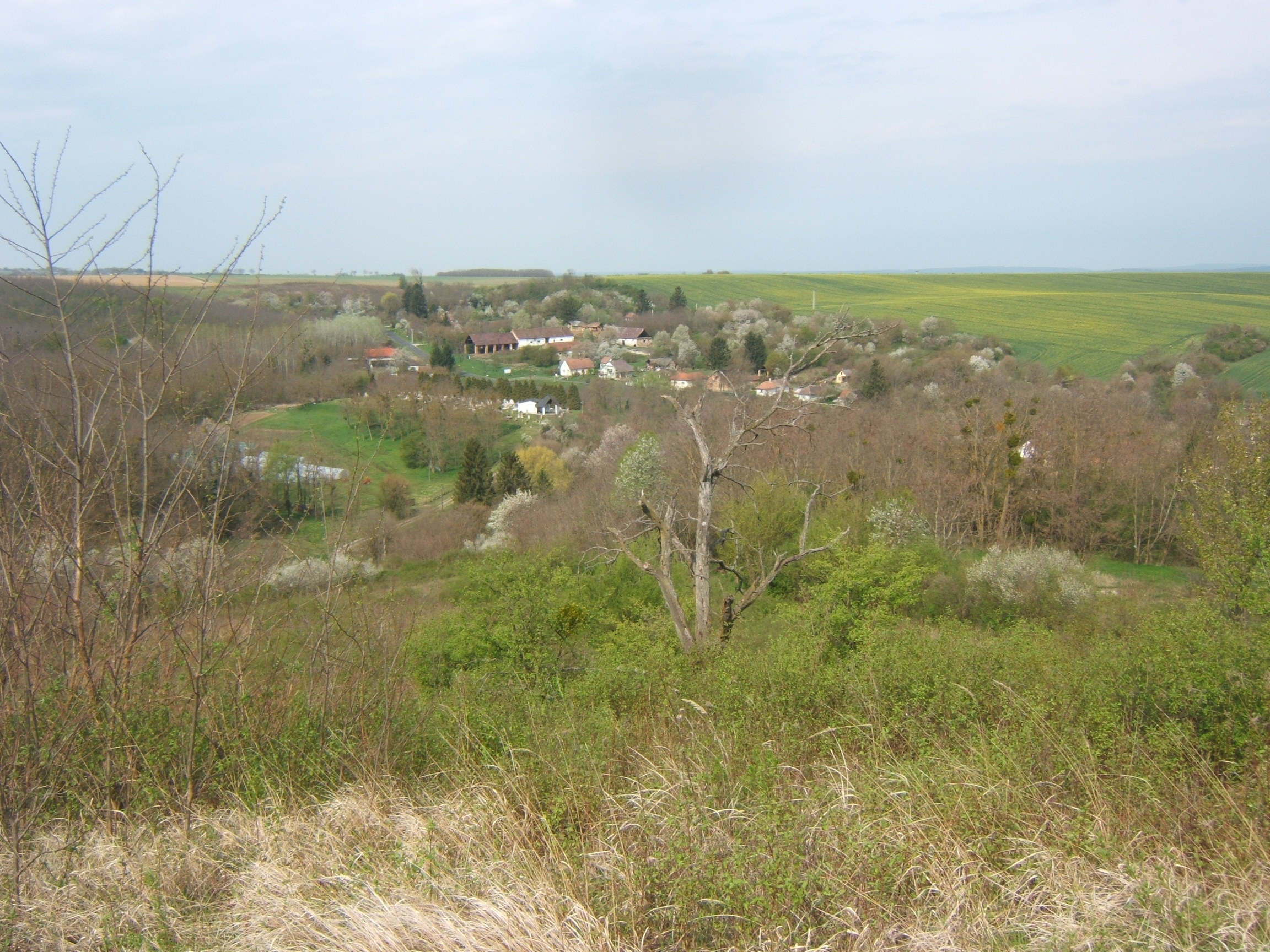
- Interactive map of Zalaszentmárton
- Country: Hungary
- Region: Western Transdanubia
- County: Zala County
- Time zone: UTC+1 (CET)
  - Summer (DST): UTC+2 (CEST)

Zalaszentmárton is a village in Zala County, Hungary.
