= Vindornyaszőlős =

Coordinates: 46°54′N 17°10′E

- Village
- Interactive map of Vindornyaszőlős
- Country: Hungary
- Region: Western Transdanubia
- County: Zala County
- Time zone: UTC+1 (CET)
  - Summer (DST): UTC+2 (CEST)

Vindornyaszőlős is a village in Zala County, Hungary. It features a beautiful basalt mine nearby and a modest church. It is a village situated perfectly on the road between Keszthely and Sümeg, making it easier to access both cities. It is also quite near to Karmacs, so parents can send their children to the kindergarten there.
