= Egeraracsa =

- Village
- Flag Coat of arms

- Location of Egeraracsa
- Coordinates: 46.67366°N 17.07788°E
- Country: Hungary
- Region: Western Transdanubia
- County: Zala
- District: Keszthely

Area
  - Total: 7.03 km^{2} (2.71 sq mi)

Population (1 January 2025)
  - Total: 333
  - Density: 47.4/km^{2} (123/sq mi)
- Time zone: UTC+1 (CET)
  - Summer (DST): UTC+2 (CEST)
- Postal code: 8765
- Area code: (+36) 83
- Website: egeraracsa.hu

Egeraracsa is a village in Zala County, Hungary. It is located near the lake Kis-Balaton.
