= Karmacs =

Coordinates: 46°50′12″N 17°10′25″E

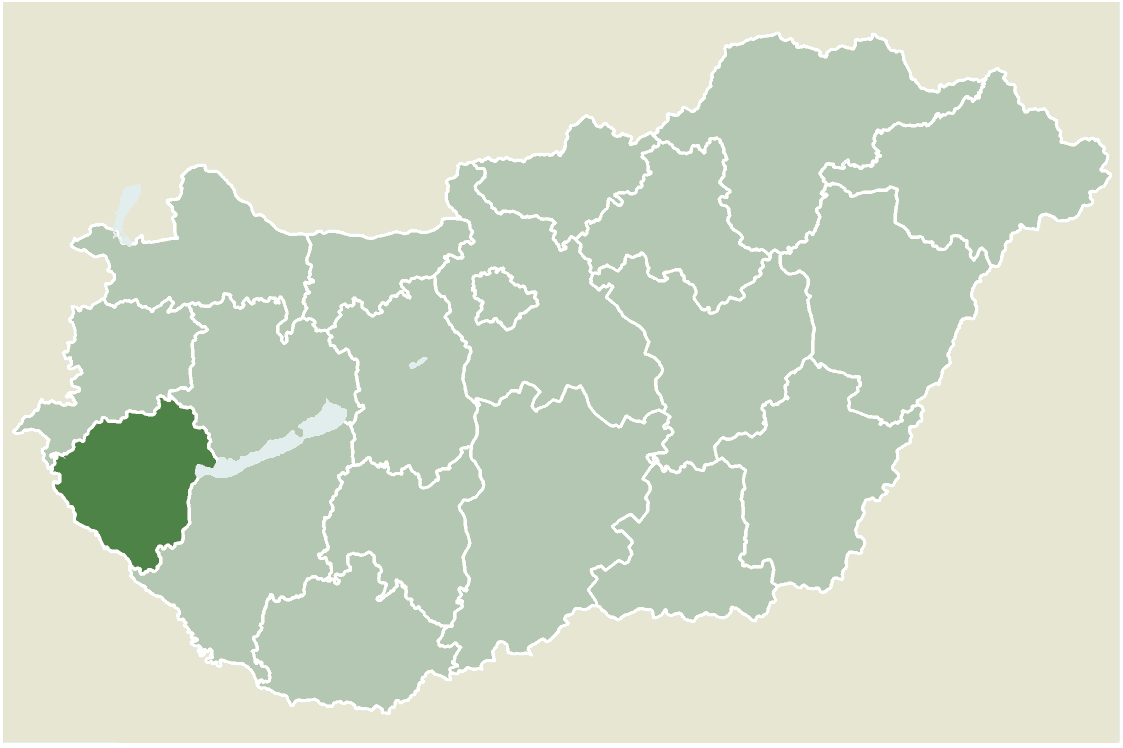
- Location of Zala county in Hungary
- Country: Hungary
- County: Zala

Area
  - Total: 14.22 km^{2} (5.49 sq mi)

Population (2012)
  - Total: 783
  - Density: 54.08/km^{2} (140.1/sq mi)
- Time zone: UTC+1 (CET)
  - Summer (DST): UTC+2 (CEST)
- Postal code: 8354
- Area code: 83

Karmacs is a village in Zala County, Hungary.

== Location ==
Karmacs is located in the east part of Zala County. The nearest town is Hévíz.
