= Balatongyörök =

- Village
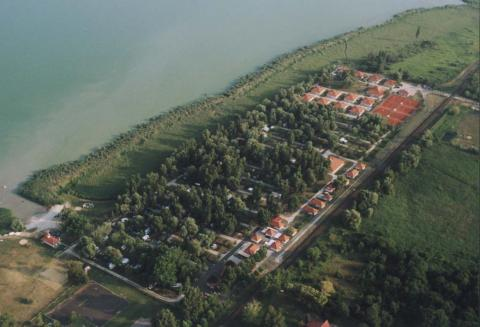

- Flag Coat of arms

- Location of Balatongyörök
- Coordinates: 46.76163°N 17.34868°E
- Country: Hungary
- Region: Western Transdanubia
- County: Zala
- District: Keszthely

Area
  - Total: 37.59 km^{2} (14.51 sq mi)

Population (1 January 2025)
  - Total: 1,297
  - Density: 34.50/km^{2} (89.36/sq mi)
- Time zone: UTC+1 (CET)
  - Summer (DST): UTC+2 (CEST)
- Postal code: 8313
- Area code: (+36) 83
- Website: balatongyorok.hu

Balatongyörök is a village in Zala County, Hungary. Balatongyörök is located on the northern shore of Lake Balaton, not far from Keszthely. It has a view of the Badacsony.
