= List of populated places in Hungary (N) =

This is a list of cities, towns and villages of Hungary

KEY: T = Town ; V = Village

Name	Rank	County	District	Population	Post code
Nábrád	V	Szabolcs-Szatmár-Bereg	Fehérgyarmati	958	4911
Nadap	V	Fejér	Gárdonyi	457	8097
Nádasd	V	Vas	Körmendi	1,337	9915
Nádasdladány	V	Fejér	Székesfehérvári	1,870	8145
Nádudvar	T	Hajdú-Bihar	Püspökladányi	9,260	4181
Nágocs	V	Somogy	Tabi	704	8674
Nagyacsád	V	Veszprém	Pápai	731	8521
Nagyalásony	V	Veszprém	Ajkai	516	8484
Nagyar	V	Szabolcs-Szatmár-Bereg	Fehérgyarmati	730	4922
Nagyatád	T	Somogy	Nagyatádi	12,020	7500
Nagybajcs	V	Gyor-Moson-Sopron	Gyori	865	9063
Nagybajom	T	Somogy	Kaposvári	3,664	7561
Nagybakónak	V	Zala	Nagykanizsai	485	8821
Nagybánhegyes	V	Békés	Mezokovácsházi	1,474	5668
Nagybaracska	V	Bács-Kiskun	Bajai	2,438	6527
Nagybarca	V	Borsod-Abaúj-Zemplén	Kazincbarcikai	979	3641
Nagybárkány	V	Nógrád	Bátonyterenyei	699	3075
Nagyberény	V	Somogy	Siófoki	1,434	8656
Nagyberki	V	Somogy	Kaposvári	1,551	7255
Nagybörzsöny	V	Pest	Szobi	871	2634
Nagybudmér	V	Baranya	Mohácsi	251	7756
Nagycenk	V	Gyor-Moson-Sopron	Sopron–Fertodi	1,829	9485
Nagycsány	V	Baranya	Sellyei	164	7964
Nagycsécs	V	Borsod-Abaúj-Zemplén	Tiszaújvárosi	910	3598
Nagycsepely	V	Somogy	Balatonföldvári	399	8628
Nagycserkesz	V	Szabolcs-Szatmár-Bereg	Nyíregyházai	1,875	4445
Nagydém	V	Veszprém	Pápai	421	8554
Nagydobos	V	Szabolcs-Szatmár-Bereg	Mátészalkai	2,280	4823
Nagydobsza	V	Baranya	Szigetvári	680	7985
Nagydorog	V	Tolna	Paksi	2,814	7044
Nagyecsed	T	Szabolcs-Szatmár-Bereg	Mátészalkai	6,868	4355
Nagyér	V	Csongrád	Makói	615	6917
Nagyesztergár	V	Veszprém	Zirci	1,249	8415
Nagyfüged	V	Heves	Gyöngyösi	2,751	3282
Nagygeresd	V	Tolna	Csepregi	290	9664
Nagygörbo	V	Zala	Zalaszentgróti	232	8356
Nagygyimót	V	Veszprém	Pápai	598	8551
Nagyhajmás	V	Baranya	Sásdi	423	7343
Nagyhalász	T	Szabolcs-Szatmár-Bereg	Ibrány–Nagyhalászi	5,963	4485
Nagyharsány	V	Baranya	Siklósi	1,731	7822
Nagyhegyes	V	Hajdú-Bihar	Hajdúszoboszlói	2,710	4064
Nagyhódos	V	Szabolcs-Szatmár-Bereg	Fehérgyarmati	131	4977
Nagyhuta	V	Borsod-Abaúj-Zemplén	Sátoraljaújhelyi	88	3994
Nagyigmánd	V	Komárom-Esztergom	Komáromi	3,154	2942
Nagyiván	V	Jász-Nagykun-Szolnok	Tiszafüredi	1,234	5363
Nagykálló	T	Szabolcs-Szatmár-Bereg	Nagykállói	10,726	4320
Nagykamarás	V	Békés	Mezokovácsházi	1,657	5751
Nagykanizsa	city w. county rights	Zala	Nagykanizsai	51,788	8800
Nagykapornak	V	Zala	Zalaegerszegi	944	8935
Nagykarácsony	V	Fejér	Dunaújvárosi	1,551	2425
Nagykáta	T	Pest	Nagykátai	12,991	2760
Nagykereki	V	Hajdú-Bihar	Berettyóújfalui	1,384	4127
Nagykeresztúr	V	Nógrád	Bátonyterenyei	305	3129
Nagykinizs	V	Borsod-Abaúj-Zemplén	Szikszói	353	3844
Nagykónyi	V	Tolna	Tamási	1,267	7092
Nagykorpád	V	Somogy	Nagyatádi	647	7545
Nagykovácsi	V	Pest	Pilisvörösvári	4,848	2094
Nagykozár	V	Baranya	Pécsi	1,387	7741
Nagykökényes	V	Heves	Hatvani	1,728	3012
Nagykölked	V	Tolna	Körmendi	152	9784
Nagykorös	T	Pest	Ceglédi	25,657	2750
Nagyköru	V	Jász-Nagykun-Szolnok	Szolnoki	1,725	5065
Nagykutas	V	Zala	Zalaegerszegi	466	8911
Nagylak	V	Csongrád	Makói	611	6933
Nagylengyel	V	Zala	Zalaegerszegi	479	8983
Nagylóc	V	Nógrád	Szécsényi	1,751	3175
Nagylók	V	Fejér	Sárbogárdi	1,151	2435
Nagylózs	V	Gyor-Moson-Sopron	Sopron–Fertodi	898	9482
Nagymágocs	V	Csongrád	Szentesi	3,466	6622
Nagymányok	V	Tolna	Bonyhádi	2,510	7355
Nagymaros	T	Pest	Váci	4,469	2626
Nagymizdó	V	Tolna	Körmendi	143	9913
Nagynyárád	V	Baranya	Mohácsi	865	7784
Nagyoroszi	V	Nógrád	Rétsági	2,283	2645
Nagypáli	V	Zala	Zalaegerszegi	318	8912
Nagypall	V	Baranya	Pécsváradi	444	7731
Nagypeterd	V	Baranya	Szigetvári	696	7912
Nagypirit	V	Veszprém	Ajkai	325	8496
Nagyrábé	V	Hajdú-Bihar	Püspökladányi	2,351	4173
Nagyrada	V	Zala	Nagykanizsai	552	8746
Nagyrákos	V	Tolna	Oriszentpéteri	319	9938
Nagyrécse	V	Zala	Nagykanizsai	1,057	8756
Nagyréde	V	Heves	Gyöngyösi	3,434	3214
Nagyrév	V	Jász-Nagykun-Szolnok	Kunszentmártoni	856	5463
Nagyrozvágy	V	Borsod-Abaúj-Zemplén	Bodrogközi	739	3965
Nagysáp	V	Komárom-Esztergom	Dorogi	1,547	2524
Nagysimonyi	V	Vas	Celldömölki	985	9561
Nagyszakácsi	V	Somogy	Marcali	490	8739
Nagyszékely	V	Tolna	Tamási	500	7085
Nagyszekeres	V	Szabolcs-Szatmár-Bereg	Fehérgyarmati	543	4962
Nagyszénás	V	Békés	Orosházi	5,691	5931
Nagyszentjános	V	Gyor-Moson-Sopron	Gyori	1,882	9072
Nagyszokoly	V	Tolna	Tamási	984	7097
Nagytálya	V	Heves	Egri	1,319	3398
Nagytarcsa	V	Pest	Gödölloi	2,818	2142
Nagytevel	V	Veszprém	Pápai	544	8562
Nagytilaj	V	Tolna	Vasvári	183	9832
Nagytótfalu	V	Baranya	Siklósi	392	7800
Nagytoke	V	Csongrád	Szentesi	520	6612
Nagyút	V	Heves	Füzesabonyi	1,894	3357
Nagyvarsány	V	Szabolcs-Szatmár-Bereg	Vásárosnaményi	1,599	4812
Nagyváty	V	Baranya	Szigetvári	354	7940
Nagyvázsony	V	Veszprém	Veszprémi	1,803	8291
Nagyvejke	V	Tolna	Bonyhádi	200	7186
Nagyveleg	V	Fejér	Móri	720	8065
Nagyvenyim	V	Fejér	Dunaújvárosi	4,027	2421
Nagyvisnyó	V	Heves	Bélapátfalvai	4,302	3349
Nak	V	Tolna	Dombóvári	679	7215
Napkor	V	Szabolcs-Szatmár-Bereg	Nyíregyházai	3,789	4552
Nárai	V	Vas	Szombathelyi	1,083	9797
Narda	V	Vas	Szombathelyi	517	9793
Naszály	V	Komárom-Esztergom	Tatai	2,263	2899
Négyes	V	Borsod-Abaúj-Zemplén	Mezokövesdi	287	3463
Nekézseny	V	Borsod-Abaúj-Zemplén	Ózdi	906	3646
Nemesapáti	V	Zala	Zalaegerszegi	547	8923
Nemesbikk	V	Borsod-Abaúj-Zemplén	Tiszaújvárosi	1,055	3592
Nemesborzova	V	Szabolcs-Szatmár-Bereg	Fehérgyarmati	103	4942
Nemesbod	V	Vas	Szombathelyi	637	9749
Nemesbük	V	Zala	Keszthely–Hévízi	598	8371
Nemescsó	V	Tolna	Koszegi	314	9739
Nemesdéd	V	Somogy	Marcali	756	8722
Nemesgörzsöny	V	Veszprém	Pápai	776	8522
Nemesgulács	V	Veszprém	Tapolcai	1,050	8284
Nemeshany	V	Veszprém	Sümegi	444	8471
Nemeshetés	V	Zala	Zalaegerszegi	320	8925
Nemeske	V	Baranya	Szigetvári	298	7981
Nemeskér	V	Gyor-Moson-Sopron	Sopron–Fertodi	234	9471
Nemeskeresztúr	V	Tolna	Celldömölki	307	9548
Nemeskisfalud	V	Somogy	Marcali	58	8717
Nemeskocs	V	Tolna	Celldömölki	376	9542
Nemeskolta	V	Tolna	Szombathelyi	374	9775
Nemesládony	V	Tolna	Csepregi	130	9663
Nemesmedves	V	Tolna	Szentgotthárdi	20	9953
Nemesnádudvar	V	Bács-Kiskun	Bajai	2,030	6345
Nemesnép	V	Zala	Lenti	146	8976
Nemespátró	V	Zala	Nagykanizsai	360	8856
Nemesrádó	V	Zala	Zalaegerszegi	343	8915
Nemesrempehollós	V	Tolna	Körmendi	299	9782
Nemessándorháza	V	Zala	Zalaegerszegi	318	8925
Nemesvámos	V	Veszprém	Veszprémi	2,562	8248
Nemesvid	V	Somogy	Marcali	858	8738
Nemesvita	V	Veszprém	Tapolcai	400	8311
Nemesszalók	V	Veszprém	Pápai	1,007	9533
Nemesszentandrás	V	Zala	Zalaegerszegi	281	8925
Németbánya	V	Veszprém	Pápai	91	8581
Németfalu	V	Zala	Zalaegerszegi	214	8918
Németkér	V	Tolna	Paksi	1,918	7039
Nemti	V	Nógrád	Bátonyterenyei	809	3152
Neszmély	V	Komárom-Esztergom	Tatai	1,440	2544
Nézsa	V	Nógrád	Rétsági	1,149	2618
Nick	V	Tolna	Sárvári	549	9652
Nikla	V	Somogy	Marcali	742	8706
Nógrád	V	Nógrád	Rétsági	1,582	2642
Nógrádkövesd	V	Nógrád	Balassagyarmati	758	2691
Nógrádmarcal	V	Nógrád	Balassagyarmati	567	2675
Nógrádmegyer	V	Nógrád	Szécsényi	1,786	3132
Nógrádsáp	V	Nógrád	Rétsági	924	2685
Nógrádsipek	V	Nógrád	Szécsényi	744	3179
Nógrádszakál	V	Nógrád	Szécsényi	661	3187
Nóráp	V	Veszprém	Pápai	225	8591
Noszlop	V	Veszprém	Ajkai	1,110	8456
Noszvaj	V	Heves	Egri	1,884	3325
Nova	V	Zala	Lenti	861	8948
Novaj	V	Heves	Egri	1,852	3327
Novajidrány	V	Borsod-Abaúj-Zemplén	Encsi	1,462	3872
Notincs	V	Nógrád	Rétsági	1,195	2610

== Notes ==
- Cities marked with * have several different post codes, the one here is only the most general one.
