= Rétság District =

Coordinates: 47.9167°N 19.1833°E

Rétság District Rétsági járás
- Districts of Hungary
- Coat of arms

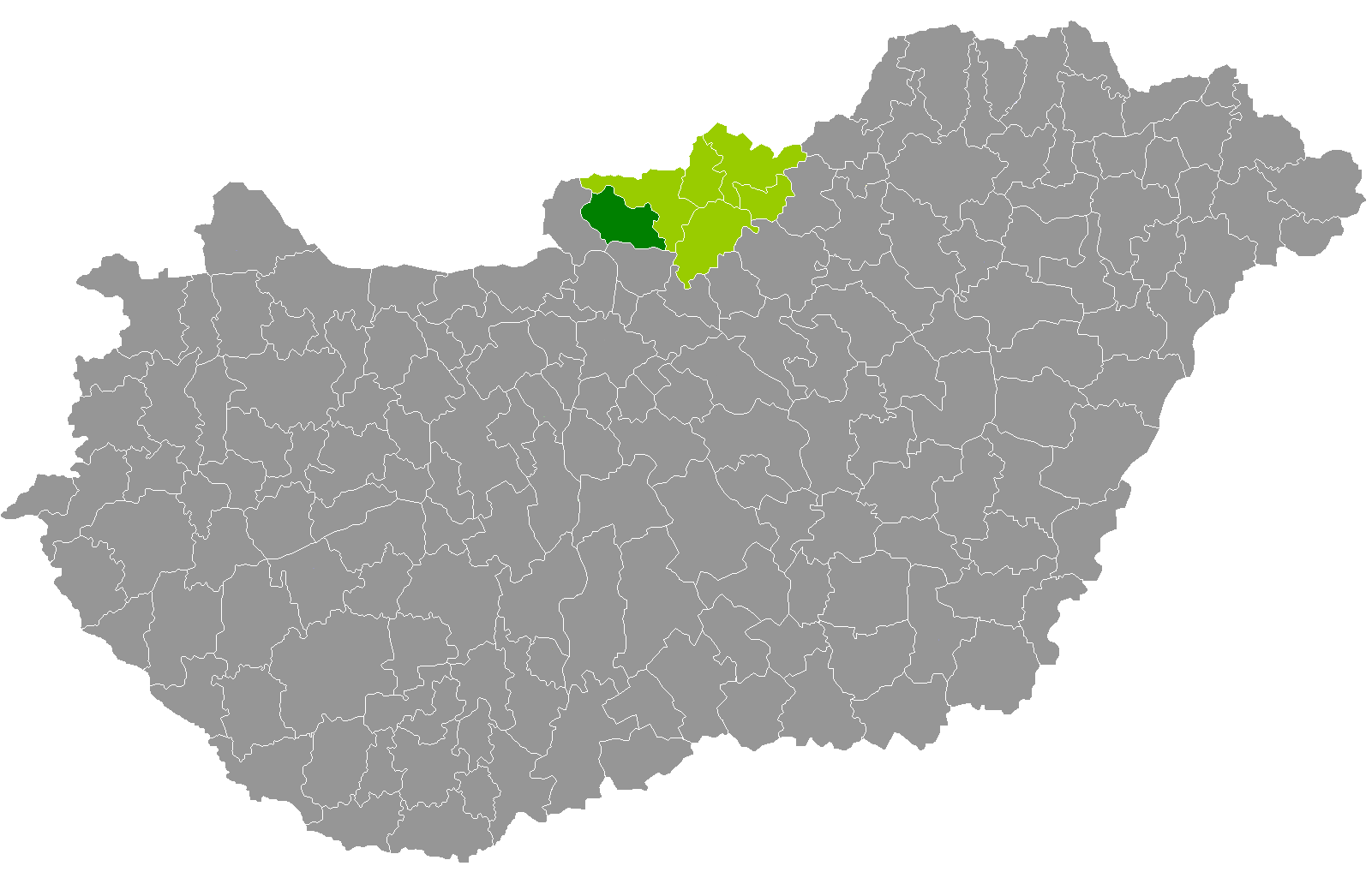
- Rétság District within Hungary and Nógrád County.
- Country: Hungary
- County: Nógrád
- District seat: Rétság

Area
  - Total: 435.03 km^{2} (167.97 sq mi)
  - Rank: 4th in Nógrád

Population (2011 census)
  - Total: 24,395
  - Rank: 4th in Nógrád
  - Density: 56/km^{2} (150/sq mi)

Rétság (Hungarian: Rétsági járás; Slovak: Rétságsky okres) is a district in western part of Nógrád County. Rétság is also the name of the town where the district seat is found. The district is located in the Northern Hungary Statistical Region.

== Geography ==
Rétság District borders with Balassagyarmat District to the northeast, Vác District (Pest County) to the south, Szob District (Pest County) to the west. The number of the inhabited places in Rétság District is 25.

== Municipalities ==
The district has 1 town and 24 villages. (ordered by population, as of 1 January 2013)

- Alsópetény (595)
- Bánk (650)
- Berkenye (614)
- Borsosberény (980)
- Diósjenő (2,768)
- Felsőpetény (590)
- Horpács (172)
- Keszeg (615)
- Kétbodony (460)
- Kisecset (160)
- Legénd (432)
- Nagyoroszi (2,143)
- Nézsa (1,092)
- Nógrád (1,389)
- Nógrádsáp (833)
- Nőtincs (1,053)
- Ősagárd (288)
- Pusztaberki (128)
- **Rétság** (2,777) – district seat
- Romhány (2,127)
- Szátok (618)
- Szendehely (1,515)
- Szente (329)
- Tereske (714)
- Tolmács (756)

The bolded municipality is the city.

== Demographics ==
Religion in Rétság District (2011 census)
1. Catholic Church (55.6%)
2. Greek Catholicism (0.30%)
3. Lutheranism (7.20%)
4. Calvinism (5.50%)
5. Other religions (1.40%)
6. Non-religious (7.10%)
7. Atheists (0.70%)
8. Undeclared (22.2%)

In 2011, it had a population of 24,395 and the population density was 56/km^{2}.

| Year | County population | Change |
|---|---|---|
| 2011 | 24,395 | n/a |

=== Ethnicity ===
Besides the Hungarian majority, the main minorities are the Slovak (approx. 1,300), German and Roma (850).

Total population (2011 census): 24,395
Ethnic groups (2011 census): Identified themselves: 24,864 persons:

- Hungarians: 21,569 (86.75%)
- Slovaks: 1,337 (5.38%)
- Germans: 841 (3.38%)
- Gypsies: 839 (3.37%)
- Others and indefinable: 278 (1.12%)

Approx. 500 persons in Rétság District did declare more than one ethnic group at the 2011 census.

=== Religion ===
Religious adherence in the county according to 2011 census:

- Catholic – 13,646 (Roman Catholic – 13,567; Greek Catholic – 77);
- Evangelical – 1,749;
- Reformed – 1,339;
- other religions – 351;
- Non-religious – 1,743;
- Atheism – 168;
- Undeclared – 5,399.

== Gallery ==
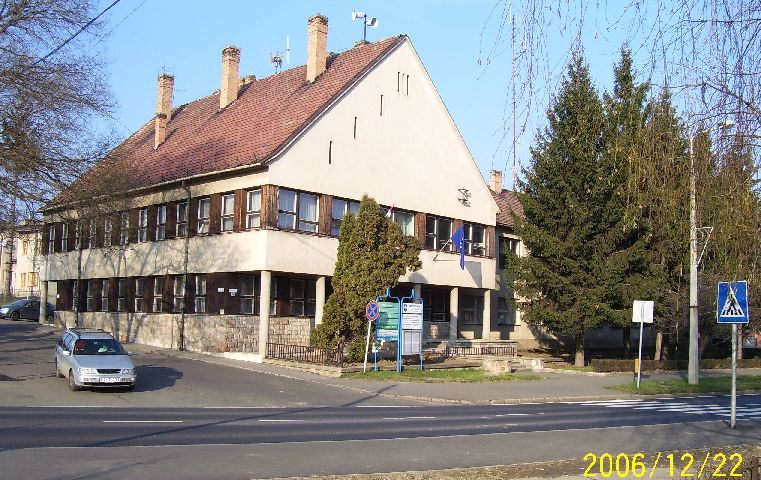
Rétság, Town Hall

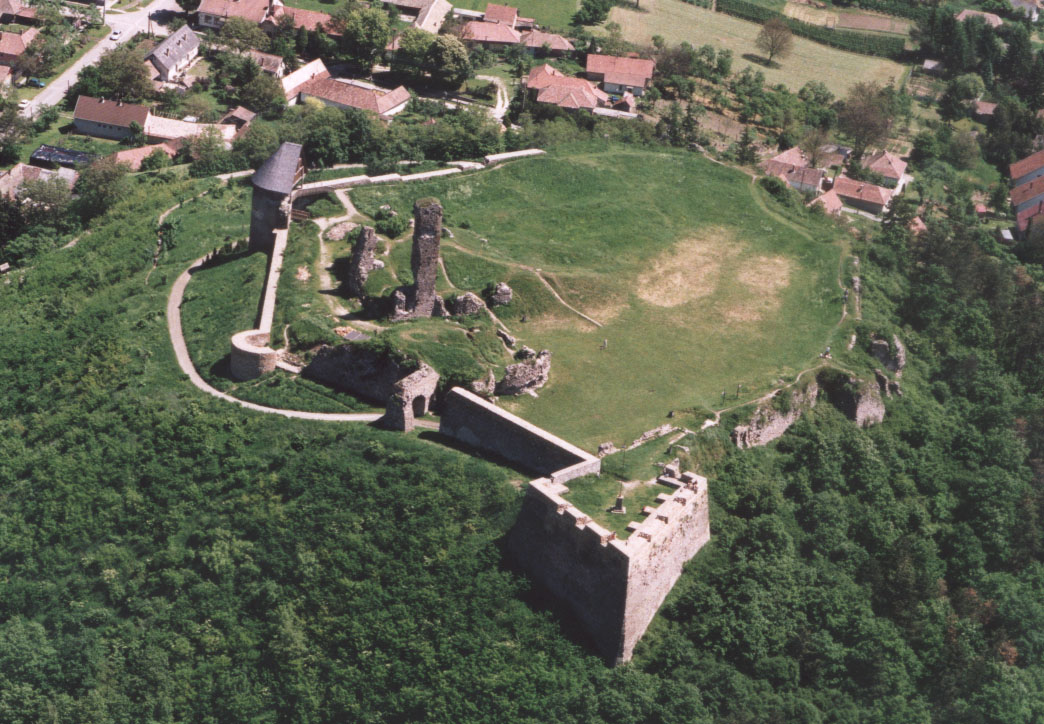
Nógrád Castle

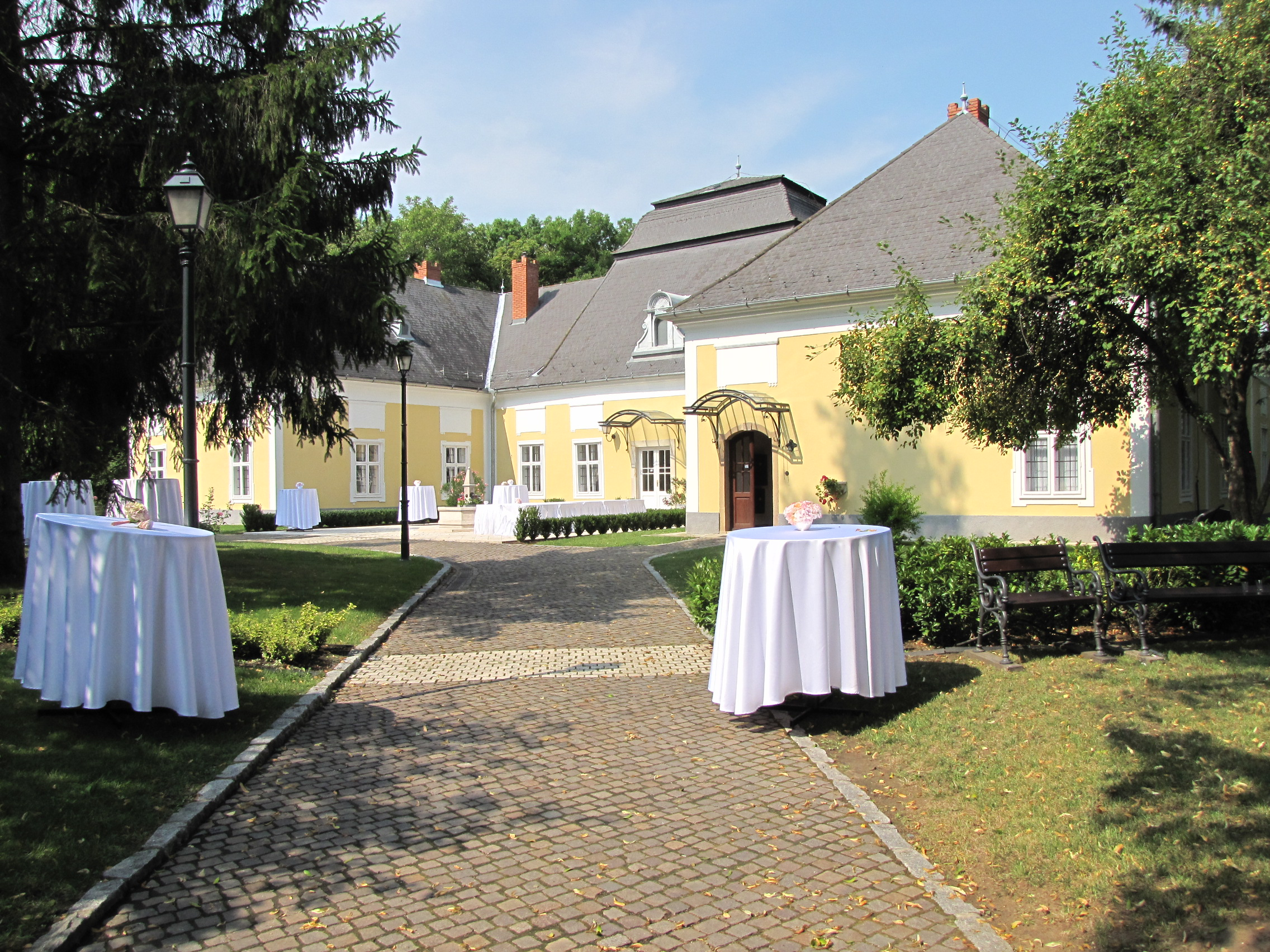
Gyurcsányi-Prónay Mansion in Alsópetény

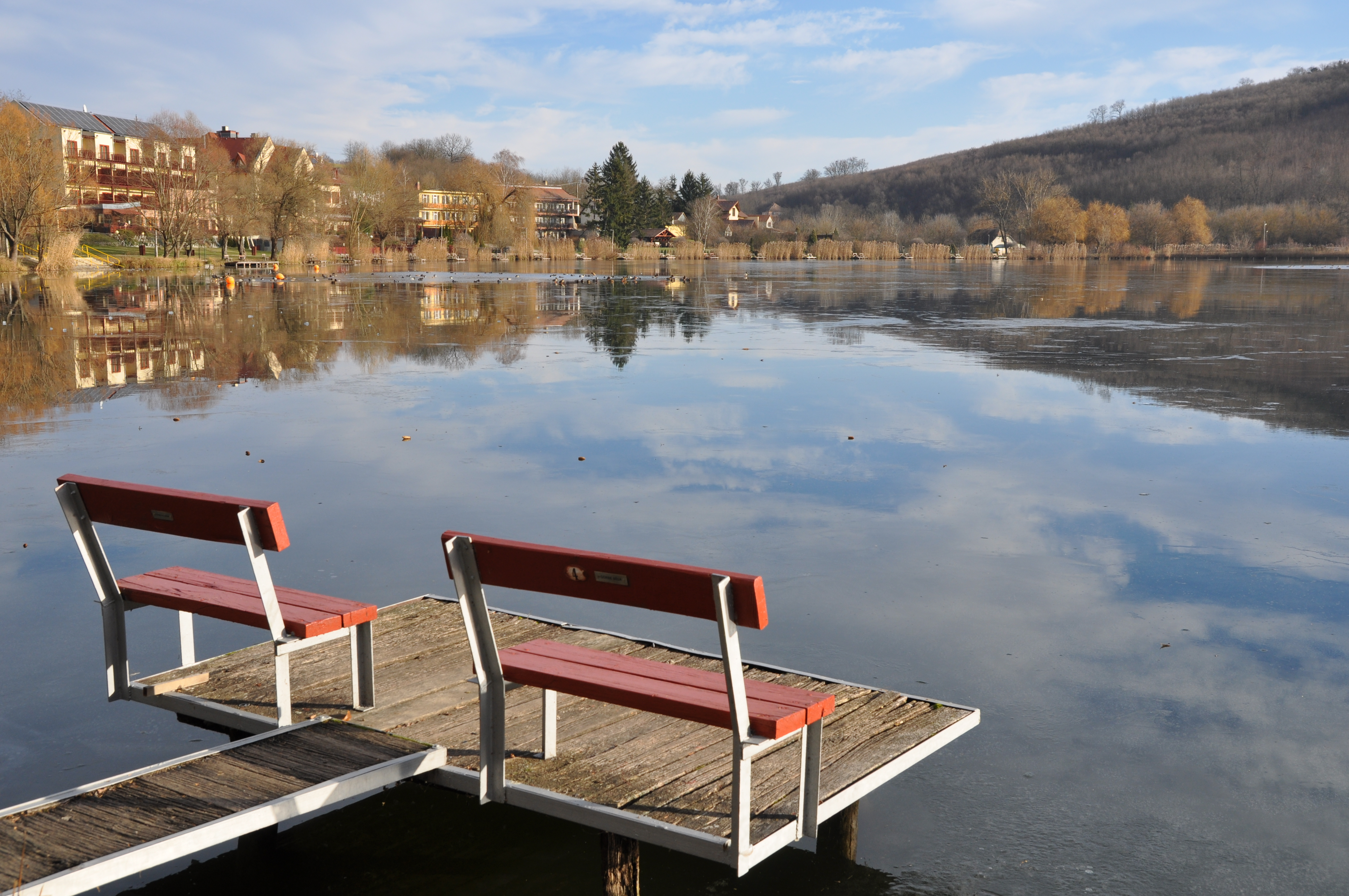
Lake Bánk

== See also ==
- List of cities and towns of Hungary
