= M2 expressway (Hungary) =

Road in Hungary

M2 expressway
- M2-es autóút
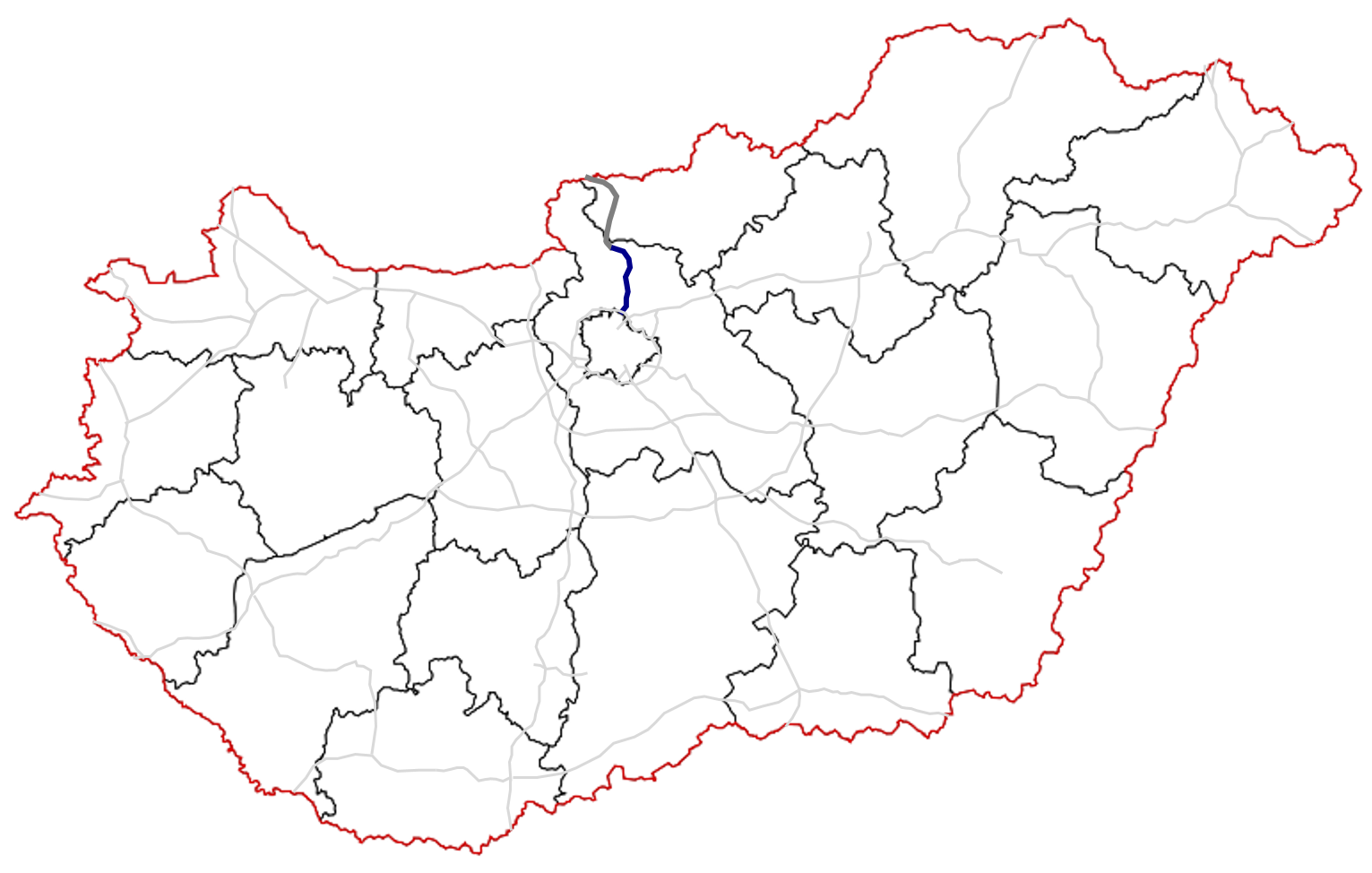
- in use planned other highways

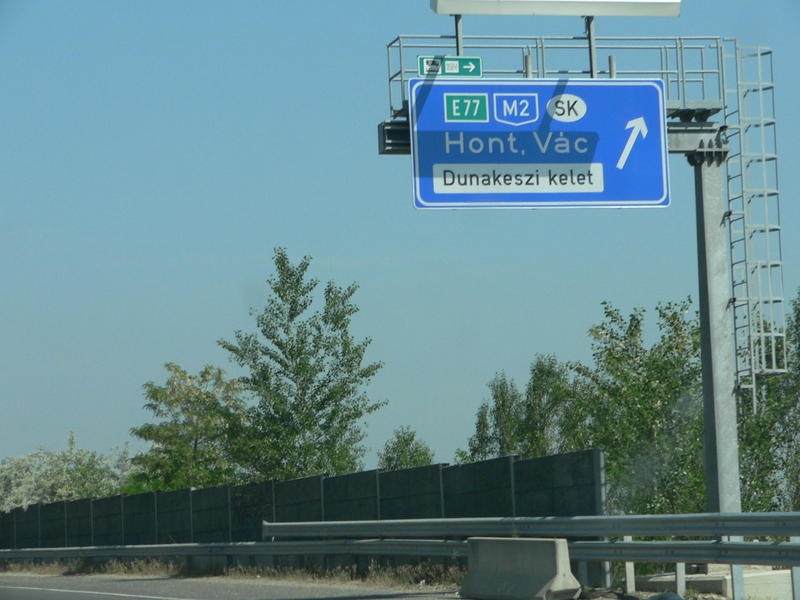
- M2 near Budapest

Route information
- Part of E77
- Length: 30 km (19 mi) 71 km (44 mi) planned
- Existed: 1996–present
- History: Expansion: 2017–19

Major junctions
- From: M0 near Budapest
- 12 near Vác; 22 near Rétság (planned)
- To: Parassapuszta (Hont) (planned); R3 border with Slovakia

Location
- Country: Hungary
- Counties: Pest, Nógrád
- Major cities: Budapest, Dunakeszi, Vác

Highway system
- Roads in Hungary; Highways; Main roads; Local roads

The M2 expressway (Hungarian: M2-es autóút) is a toll highway in northern Hungary, connecting Budapest to Vác and Banská Bystrica. The first section of the highway opened in 1996. It follows the route of the old Route 2 one-lane highway. The total length of the motorway now is 30 km.

== Timeline ==
Section	Length	Opened	Notes
Budapest (M0) – Vác észak	30.0 km (18.64 mi)	Single carriageway: 1998; Second carriageway: 1 October 2019	Built between 1996 – 1998. Originally the name of the route was 2A, and 2B. Both carriageways were fully built between 2017 – 2019 until Vác dél junction.
Vác észak – Hont-Parassapuszta (border)	41 km (25.48 mi)		Planned

== Route description ==
- The route is expressway. The maximum speed limit is 110km/h, with (2x2 lane road) until Vác dél junction.

County	km	Type	Destination	Notes
Budapest	17	Interchange	Budapest Ring M0 / E77 – Budapest, towards to M3 / M4 / M5 + / M0 – Main road 2 Újpest, Megyeri Bridge, and Main road 11 Esztergom	The southern terminus of the expressway, and E77 route. Distance is measured from the Zero Kilometre Stone monument in Budapest. trumpet interchange
Pest	21	Exit	Dunakeszi / Fót	
Pest	23	Exit	Dunakeszi-Tóváros / Fót-Kisalag	
Pest	25	Exit	Main road 2 – Dunakeszi-Révdűlő	
Pest	25	Rest area	Alagi pihenőhely	parking, petrol station (Shell), motel, café and restaurant pihenőhely means Rest area
Pest	27	Exit	Göd-Iparterület	Ipaterület means Industrial area
Pest	29	Exit	Göd	
Pest	34	Exit	Sződliget / Sződ	
Pest	37	Exit	Vác dél / Gödöllő, Vácrátót	The northern terminus of the expressway. dél means South
Pest	39	Exit	Vác-Alsóváros, toward to Tahitótfalu / Rád, Vácduka	1-lane expressway, planned expansion
Pest	42	Exit	Vác-Centrum, Deákvár / Kosd	Centrum means center
Pest	48	Exit	Vác észak, toward to Tahitótfalu / Main road 12 – Szob	Northern side of the road. észak means North 1-lane expressway, planned expansion
Nógrád	56	Exit	Nőtincs / Nógrád	Planned
Nógrád	59	Exit	Main road 2 – Rétság dél	dél means South
Nógrád	61	Rest area	Rétsági pihenőhely	
Nógrád	65	Exit	Main road 22 – Rétság észak / Balassagyarmat, Érsekvadkert	észak means South
Nógrád	83	Rest area	Drégelypalánki pihenőhely	planned petrol station
Nógrád		Exit	Main road 2 – Drégelypalánk	
Nógrád	88	Border crossing within the EU	Hont-Parassauszta (H) – Šahy (SK) border crossing R3 / E77 – Banská Bystrica towards to Kraków (PL)	Planned
1.000 mi = 1.609 km; 1.000 km = 0.621 mi: Concurrency terminus; Incomplete access; Unopened

== Maintenance ==
The operation and maintenance of the road by Hungarian Public Road Nonprofit Pte Ltd Co. This activity is provided by this highway engineer.

- near Gödöllő (M3), kilometre trench 27

== Payment ==
Hungarian system has 2 main type in terms of salary:

1, time-based fee vignettes (E-matrica)1, time-based fee vignettes (E-matrica);

- Cars, vans and motorbikes up to 3.5 tonnes only need to buy a single vignette which costs 6,400 Hungarian forint (Ft) for 10 days, 10,360 Ft for 1 month and 57,260 Ft for a year, from 1 January 2024.

2, county vignettes (Megyei matrica); the highway can be used instead of the national sticker with the following county stickers:

Type of county vignette	Available section
Pest	full length (17 km – 48 km)

== European Route(s) ==
Name	Route
	71 km	(Slovakia) Rýchlostná cesta R3 – junction (16)

== See also ==
- Roads in Hungary
- Transport in Hungary
- International E-road network
