= Gábor Andreánszky =

Gábor Andreánszky may refer to:

- Gábor Andreánszky (politician) (1848–1908), Hungarian politician and Member of Parliament
- Gábor Andreánszky (botanist) (1895–1967), Hungarian botanist and son of the above
