= Nőtincs =

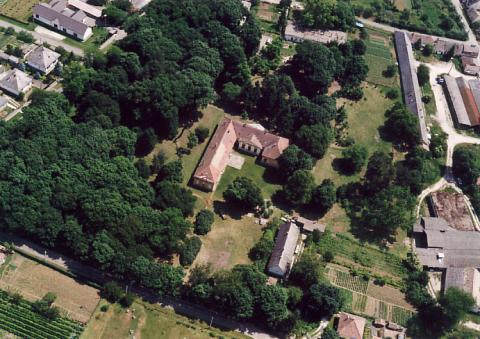
- Aerial view

- Coat of arms

- Location within Hungary
- Coordinates: 47°53′N 19°09′E
- Country: Hungary
- County: Nógrád

Area
  - Total: 20.47 km^{2} (7.90 sq mi)

Population (2001)
  - Total: 1,213
  - Density: 59/km^{2} (150/sq mi)
- Time zone: UTC+1 (CET)
  - Summer (DST): UTC+2 (CEST)
- Postal code: 2610
- Area code: 35

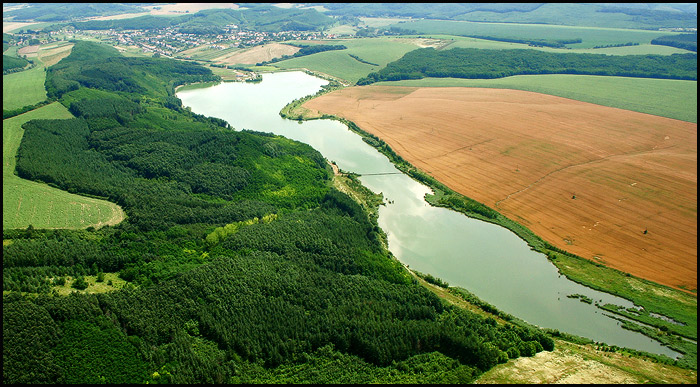

Nőtincs (Slovak: Netejč, German: Nititsch) is a village in Nógrád county, Hungary. The village is located 51 km (32 mi) north of Budapest near the European route E77, halfway between Vác and Balassagyarmat. Nőtincs is located on the border of Cserhát and Börzsöny hills. Its location determines the function of the village.

== Demographics ==
The village has 1,213 inhabitants in 466 housing units. Of its population, 96.3% are Hungarian; 0.6% Romani; 0.4% Germans; 0.4% Slovaks as well as 3.6% without closer data.

Roman-catholic: 83.1% Eastern catholic: 0.5% Reformed: 2.8% Lutheraner: 3.6% Other faiths: 0.4% Denomination lot: 3.1% No indication: 6.4%.

== History ==
The village was first mentioned in 1317. Its name comes from nő (woman) and tincs (tuft). The village of 1,213 (2001) inhabitants is situated 52 km (32 mi) from Budapest (the capital of Hungary), in the south-west of county Nógrád, at the foot of Naszály-hill and near Börzsöny-mountains, in the valley of Brooks Lókos and Hangya in a territory of 2,048 ha.

It was first mentioned in records in 1317. Its Roman Catholic Church was built in 1415. The Gyurcsányi-Scitovszky mansion was built in 1809 in a 4 ha primeval park in the middle of the village. The statue of St. Florian on the facade of the old Catholic school was made around 1780.

== Sights in neighbourhood ==
1. Bánk: Lake (beach, fishing place, water-stage), every summer nationality festival
2. Rétság: St. Andrew Roman Catholic church, Kovács mansion
3. Diósjenő: Lake (fishing place), open-air bath
4. Felsőpetény: Church, Almássy-manson
5. Nógrád: Spectacular ruins of castle Nógrád, which was the centre of Nógrád county between 11th and 13th centuries and gave the name to the county
