= Main road 2 (Hungary) =

Road in Hungary

Main road 2
- 2-es főút
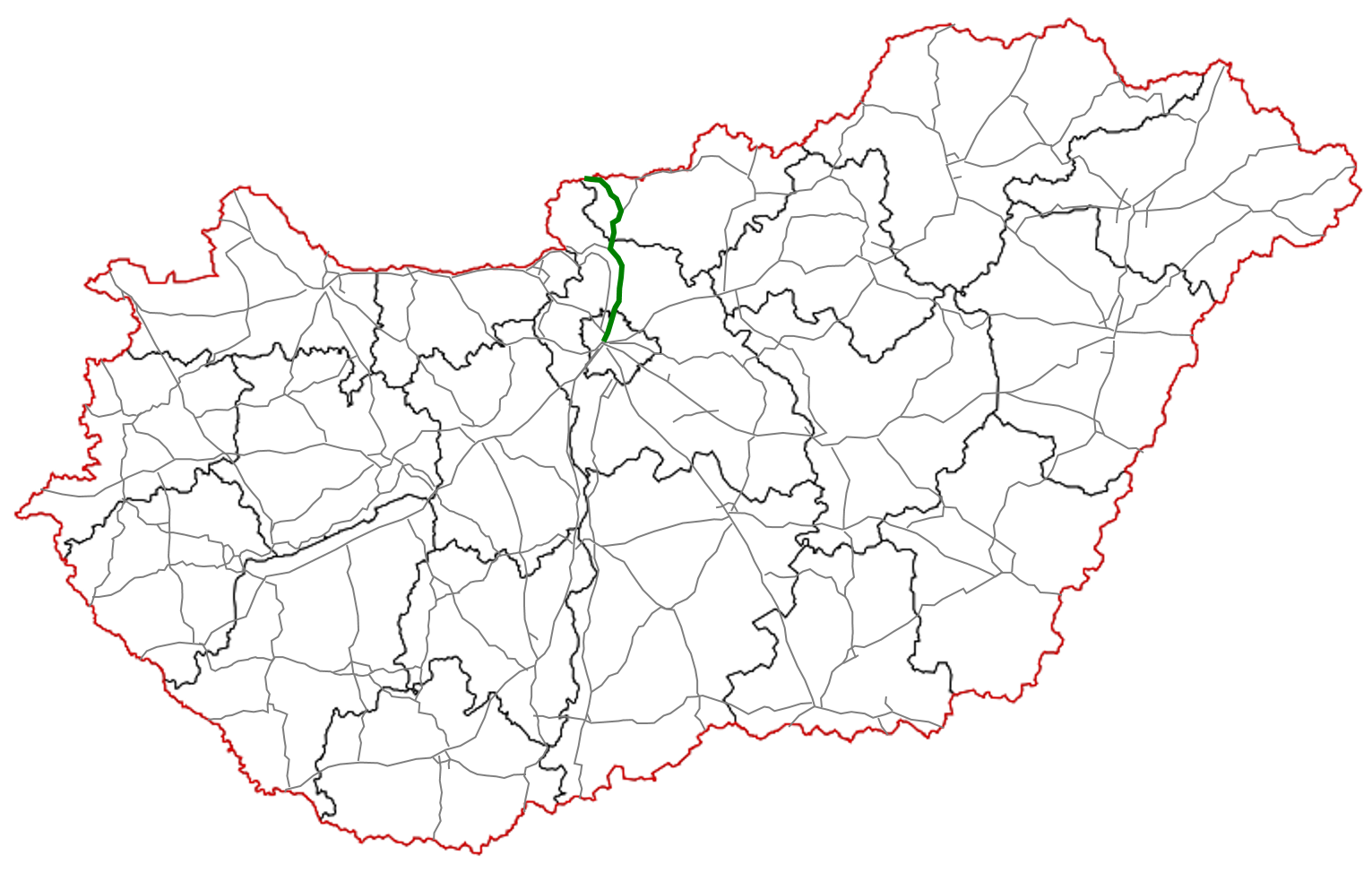

Route information
- Part of E77
- Length: 78 km (48 mi)

Major junctions
- From: Budapest
- M0 near Budapest; 12 near Vác; 22 near Rétság
- To: Parassapuszta (Hont) border with Slovakia I/66

Location
- Country: Hungary
- Counties: Pest, Nógrád
- Major cities: Budapest, Dunakeszi, Göd, Vác, Rétság

Highway system
- Roads in Hungary; Highways; Main roads; Local roads

The Main road 2 (Hungarian: 2-es főút) is a south–north direction First class main road in Hungary, that connects Budapest with Parassapuszta, Hont (the border of Slovakia). The road is 78 kilometres (48 mi) long.

The existing route is a main road with two traffic lanes. Most of the traffic was taken over by the M2 expressway.

The road, as well as all other main roads in Hungary, is managed and maintained by Magyar Közút, state owned company.

== See also ==
- Roads in Hungary
