= Gábor Andreánszky (politician) =

Hungarian politician

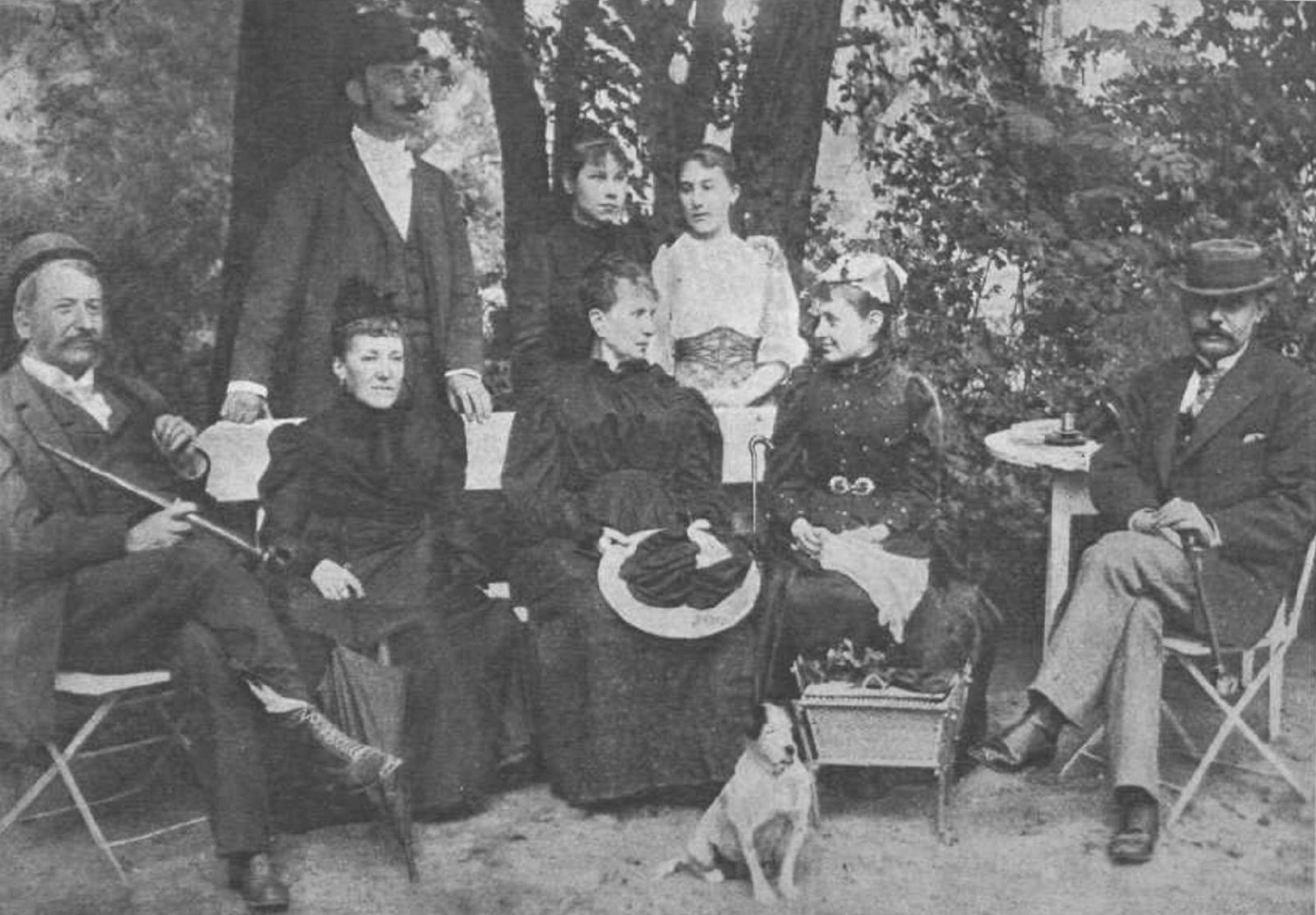
- Andreánszky (far left) in the company of Kálmán Mikszáth in Váchartyán
- Born: 23 June 1848; Vienna, Austrian Empire
- Died: 19 May 1908 (aged 59); Alsópetény, Austria-Hungary
- Occupation: politician

Baron Gábor Andreánszky de Liptószentandrás (23 June 1848 – 19 May 1908) was a Hungarian politician and Member of Parliament. He was the father of botanist Gábor Andreánszky (1895–1967).

He was born in Vienna, where his father Baron Sándor Andreánszky served in the Council of Hungarian Court Chamber. He finished his studies in Pozsony and Nagyvárad. He was involved in politics when he was still young; at the age of 17 he was a member of the Deák Party and exerted an active role during 1865 elections.

The two Andreánszky brothers, István and Gábor received the title of Baron in Hungary on 5 October 1875 by Emperor-King Francis Joseph. Earlier the family already held the title of Baron in Austria. in this same year he was appointed to a member of the House of Magnates but he gave a speech at first in 1883, during Tiszaeszlár Affair when he protested against the enabling of Christian–Jewish marriages. He joined the antisemitic movement of Győző Istóczy which transformed into the National Anti-Semitic Party. He was elected to a member of the House of Representatives in 1884 elections in the colours of his party.

He became co-chairman of the group along with Géza Ónody. Ónody represented the Independence faction (which rejected the Austro-Hungarian Compromise), while Andreánszky was the advocate of the pro-Ausgleich members. Despite this the party divided soon and virtually eliminated in 1892. During 1887 elections he unsuccessfully launched from Moderate Opposition list but soon in a by-election he was elected to MP as a representative of Nógrád. He could repeated his success in 1892 (the party renamed itself to National Party).
