= Kisecset =

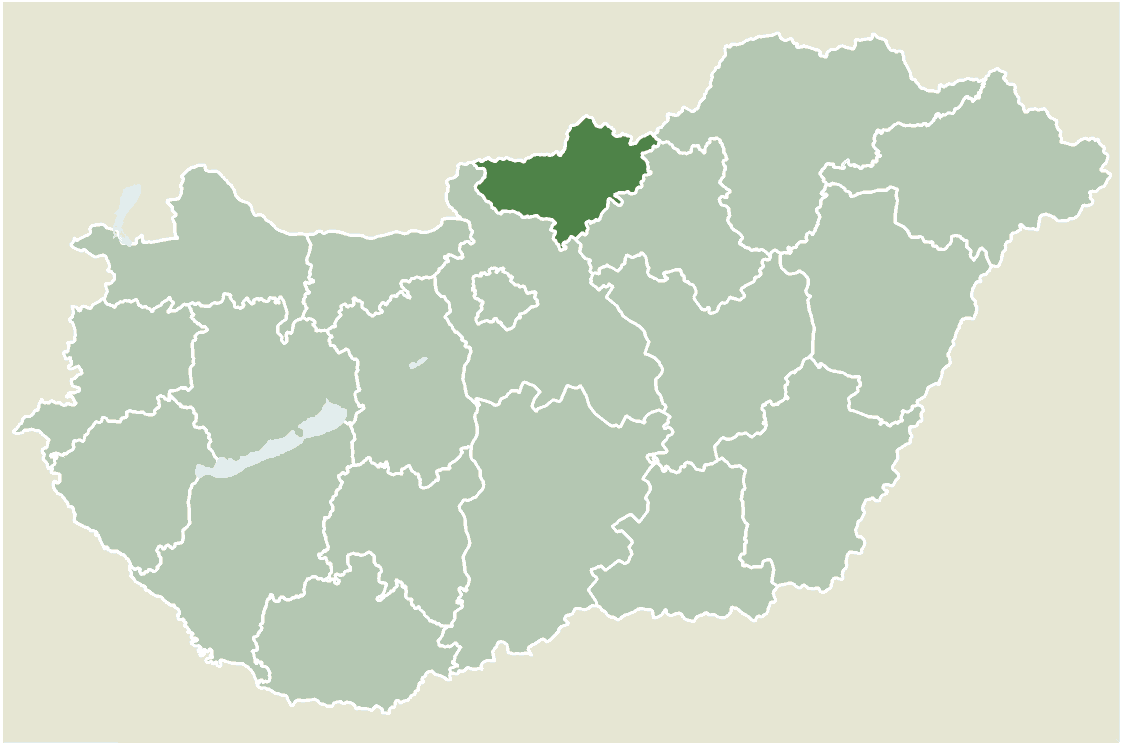
- Location of Nógrád county in Hungary

- Location of Kisecset
- Coordinates: 47.93831°N 19.31382°E
- Country: Hungary
- County: Nógrád

Area
  - Total: 8.63 km^{2} (3.33 sq mi)

Population (2007)
  - Total: 208
  - Density: 24.1/km^{2} (62/sq mi)
- Time zone: UTC+1 (CET)
  - Summer (DST): UTC+2 (CEST)
- Postal code: 2655
- Area code: 35

Kisecset is a village in Nógrád county, Hungary. The village is located east of Rétság, in Cserhát. It is not connected by a railway line and can only be reached by road.
