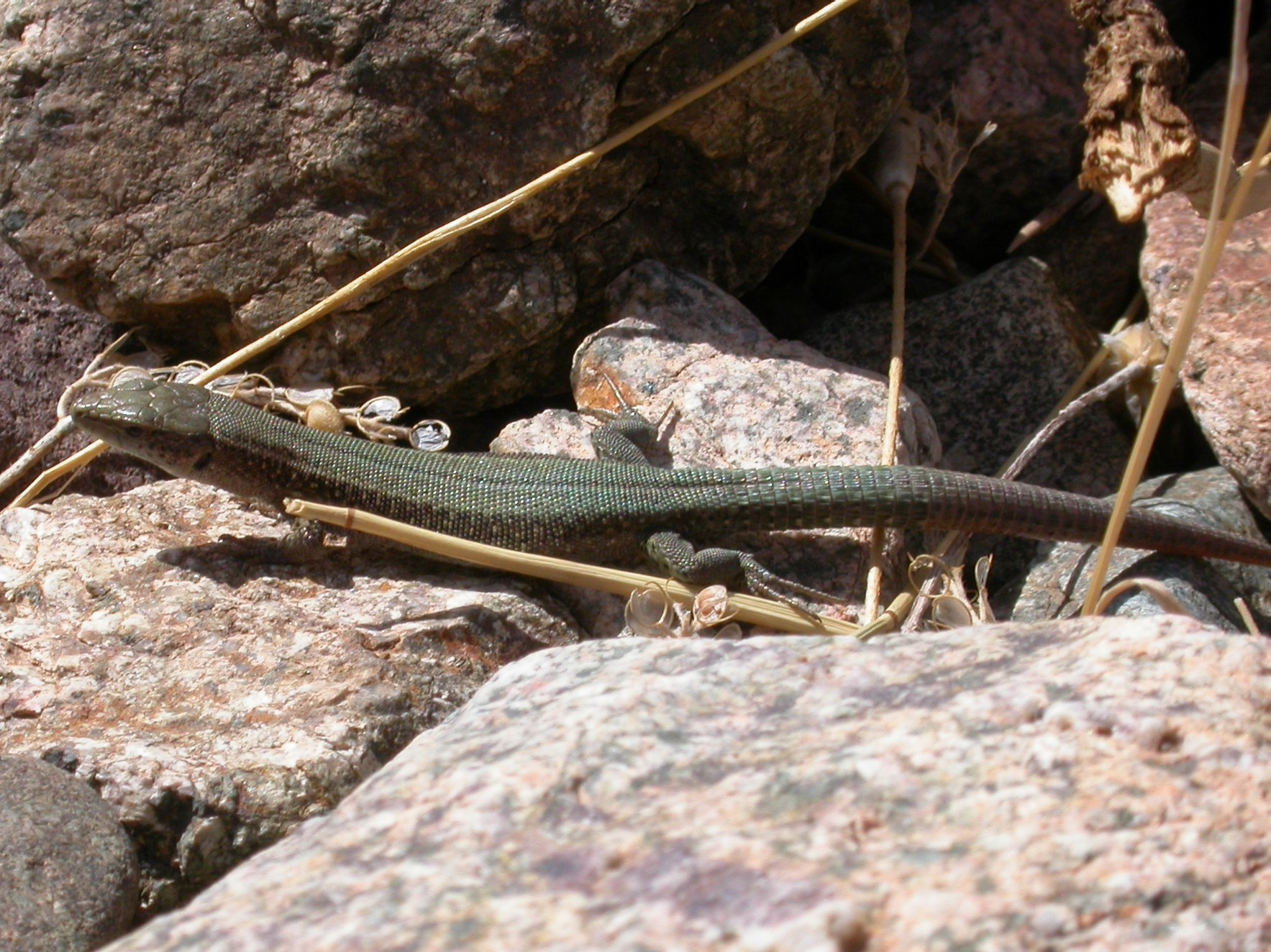

Conservation status
- Near Threatened (IUCN 3.1)

Scientific classification
- Kingdom: Animalia
- Phylum: Chordata
- Class: Reptilia
- Order: Squamata
- Family: Lacertidae
- Genus: Atlantolacerta; Arnold, Arribas & Carranza, 2007
- Species: A. andreanskyi

Binomial name
- Atlantolacerta andreanskyi (F. Werner, 1929)

Synonyms
- Lacerta andreanskyi F. Werner, 1929; Teira andreanskyi Mayer & Bischoff, 1996

= Atlas dwarf lizard =

Species of lizard

The Atlas dwarf lizard (Atlantolacerta andreanskyi), commonly known as Andreansky's lizard, is the only species in the genus Atlantolacerta, in the wall lizard family, Lacertidae. The species is indigenous to north-western Africa.

== Etymology ==
The specific name, andreanskyi, is in honor of Hungarian botanist Gábor Andreánszky.

== Geographic range ==
A. andreanskyi is endemic to Morocco, where it is restricted to the High Atlas mountain range, at 2,400 to 2,800 m (7,900 to 9,200 ft) above sea level.

== Ecology ==
Although A. andreanskyi is generally considered to be rare, animals are often well hidden in vegetation and may occur at higher densities than was first assumed. They can be very common in favourable conditions and are found in alpine meadows, scree, amongst boulders, and in areas of thorn cushion vegetation and thickets. They have long hibernation periods.

== Reproduction ==
The females of A. andreanskyi lay three clutches of between one and three eggs per year.

== Conservation status ==
A. andreanskyi does not appear to be threatened, but it does occur in readily accessible areas, most especially by hikers.
