= Pusztaberki =

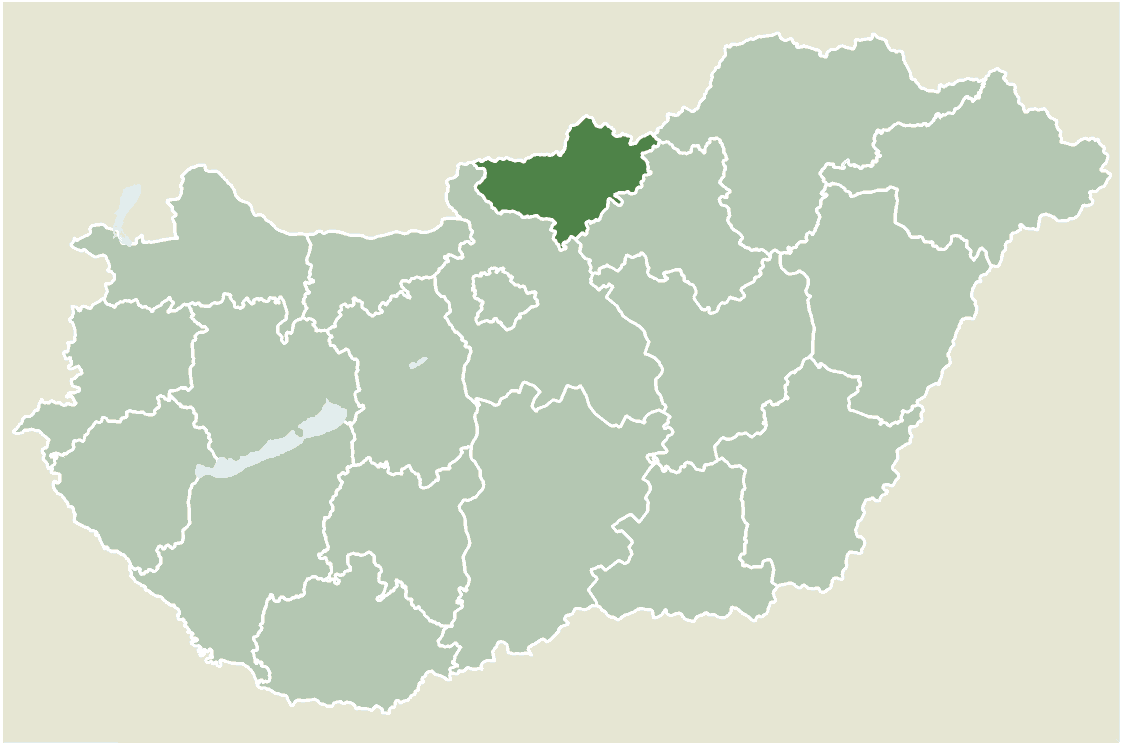
- Location of Nógrád county in Hungary

- Location of Pusztaberki
- Coordinates: 47.97643°N 19.16417°E
- Country: Hungary
- County: Nógrád

Area
  - Total: 6.85 km^{2} (2.64 sq mi)

Population (2004)
  - Total: 140
  - Density: 20.43/km^{2} (52.9/sq mi)
- Time zone: UTC+1 (CET)
  - Summer (DST): UTC+2 (CEST)
- Postal code: 2658
- Area code: 35

Pusztaberki is a village in Rétság district of Nógrád county, Hungary. It is located in the western part of the county, 55 kilometers from the capital Budapest.
