= Rétság =

- Town
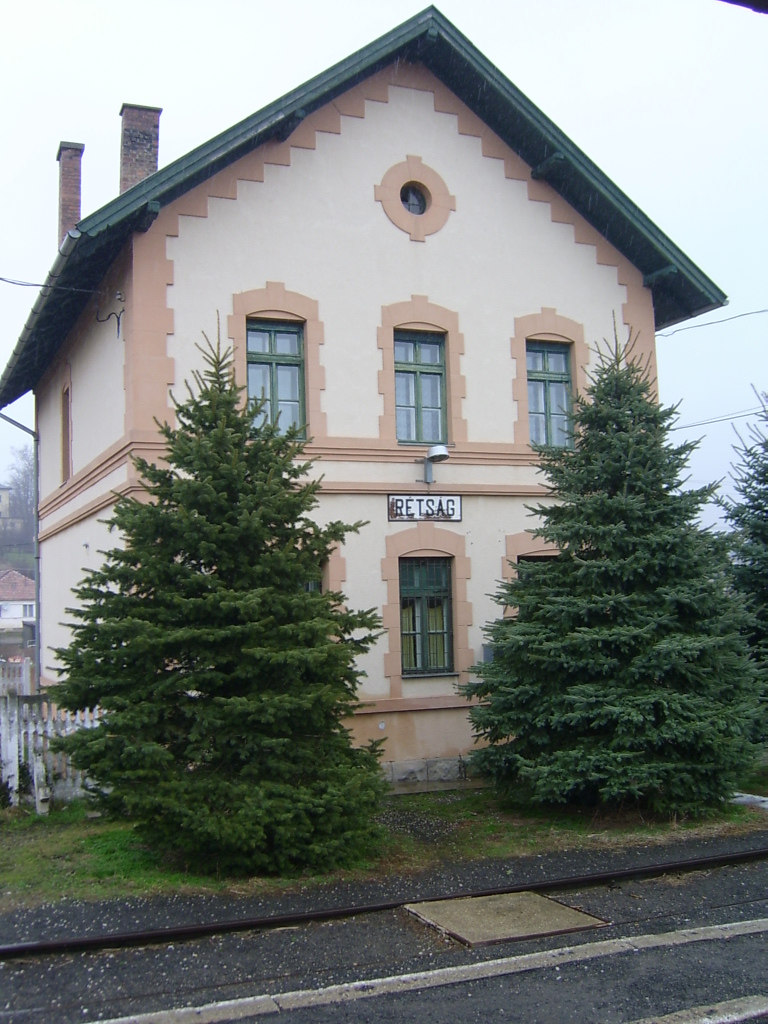
- Railway Station of Rétság

- Flag Coat of arms

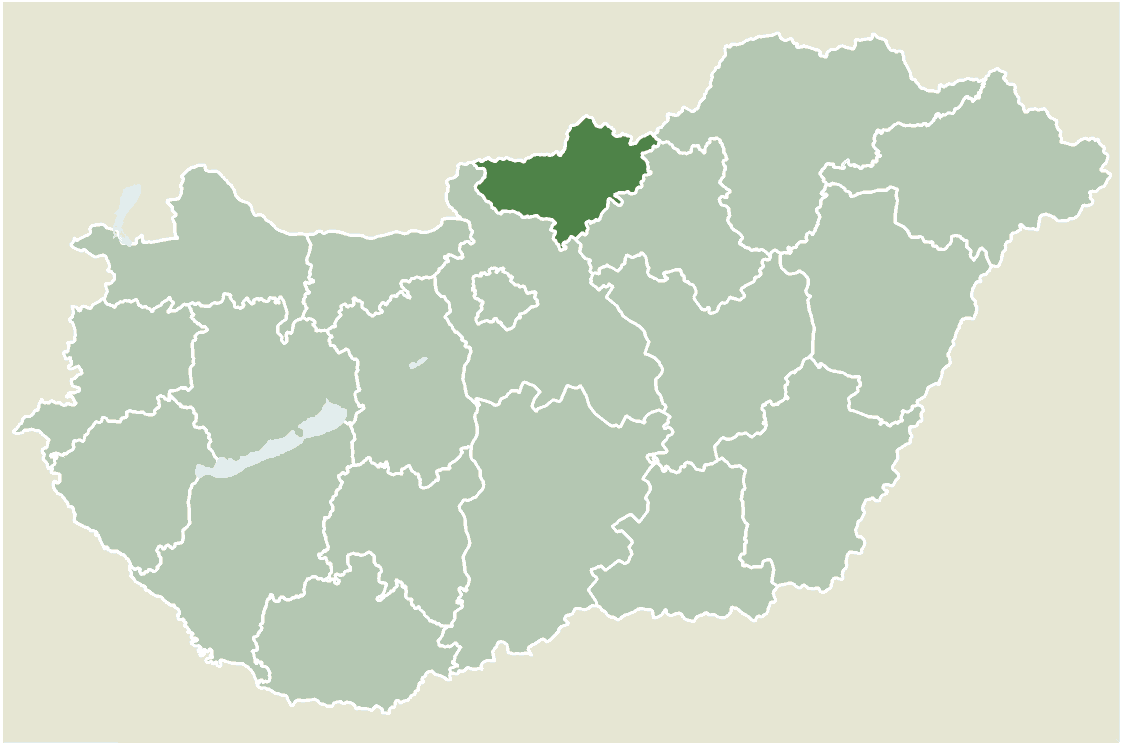
- Location of Nógrád county in Hungary

- Location of Rétság
- Coordinates: 47.92959°N 19.13675°E
- Country: Hungary
- County: Nógrád
- District: Rétság

Area
  - Total: 19.78 km^{2} (7.64 sq mi)

Population (2004)
  - Total: 3,017
  - Density: 152.52/km^{2} (395.0/sq mi)
- Time zone: UTC+1 (CET)
  - Summer (DST): UTC+2 (CEST)
- Postal code: 2651
- Area code: (+36) 35
- Website: www.retsag.hu

Rétság is a town in Nógrád county, in Hungary.

== Location ==
Rétság is located 55 km (34 mi) north of the capital Budapest on the E77 European main road, halfway between Vác and Balassagyarmat. The town is located at the border of Cserhát and Börzsöny hills. Its location determines the function of the town.

== History ==
The settlement was the property of the Losonczy family in 1393, when its name was Réthy Saag. The Ottoman conquest started in the middle of the 16th century (when castle Nógrád was captured by the Ottoman army) and lasted till the middle of the 17th century. During the Ottoman rule, Rétság became near totally desolated.
Big landowners was in Rétság: Mehmed Daud 1562–1563, Ottoman from liva of Hussein pasha 1566–1567, Bosna Hassan 1583–1584, Gábor Lónyai 1656, Paul Sréter and his family 1770, widow count Mrs. Béla Benyovszky, Sándor Rosenbach, Frigyes Herzfeld in 1910.

The St. Andrew Roman Catholic church was built in 1726. The railway connection and the railway station was built in 1908. Presidential Council of Hungarian People's Republic pronounced Rétság to be town in 1989.

Pusztaszántó belongs to Rétság was first mentioned in 1299 and was independent village in 1460. It was desolated during the Ottoman conquest, after it was settled again and the population was larger than in Rétság in the 19th century. Now it has only few inhabitants, but the industrial park of the town is here.

== Sights ==
Parsonage, St. Andrew church and town hall in Rétság

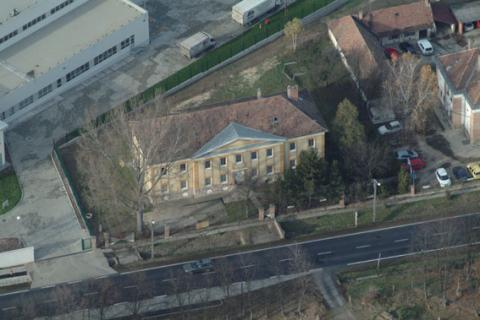
Aerial photography of Rétság

1. St. Andrew Roman catholic church built in 1726.
2. Kovács mansion built in neoclassical style in the beginning of the 19th century in Pusztaszántó.
3. Characteristic buildings of the former armoured trooper caserne can be seen from a great distance. The local regiment took place in battles of the Eastern Front of World War II, occupation of Czechoslovakia in 1968 and was disbanded in 1997
4. Grass airfield for microlighters

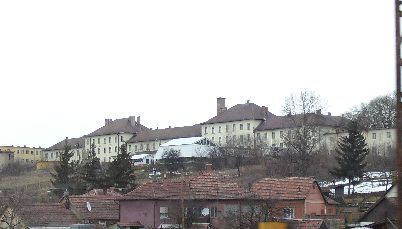
Buildings of former caserne in Rétság

== Famous people ==
Szabolcs Fényes (1912 Nagyvárad-1986 Budapest), abroad known as Peter Fényes, Hungarian operetta and musical composer and director of the Budapester Operetta Theatre in the 1940s and the 1950s lived in Rétság between 1927 and 1931 and here composed his first celebrated operetta Maya in 1931, which would be played in twelve European countries later.

== Sights in neighbourhood ==
1. Bánk: Lake (beach, fishing place, water-stage), every summer nationality festival
2. Nőtincs: Lake (fishing place)
3. Diósjenő: Lake (fishing place), open-air bath
4. Tereske: Romanesque-style church built in the 13th century
5. Nógrád: Spectacular ruins of castle Nógrád, which was the centre of Nógrád county between 11th and 13th centuries and gave the name to the county
6. Rétság Harckocsi Emlékmű: Former military barracks that were built to house armored units in the Honvéd and later the Hungarian People's Army. The buildings are vacant, but there is a VT-55 armored engineering vehicle on display as a monument.
