= Gábor Andreánszky (botanist) =

Hungarian botanist (1895 – 1967)

- Born: August 1, 1895; Alsópetény, Austria-Hungary
- Died: November 20, 1967 (aged 72); Budapest, People's Republic of Hungary
- Education: University of Budapest
- Occupation: botanist

Baron Gábor Andreánszky de Liptószentandrás (August 1, 1895 – November 20, 1967) was a Hungarian botanist, paleobotanist and explorer. He was the son of politician and MP Gábor Andreánszky (1848-1908).

== Career ==
In 1929 he was appointed professor of botany, and in 1942 ordinary professor. That same year, he was named as chief botanist in the Hungarian National Museum (now Museum of Natural History in Hungary). That position was held until 1945, when he became head of the Department of Botany at the University of Budapest, until 1952. Then, for political reasons (and probably his noble origin) he was banned.

He made several expeditions to the Balkan Peninsula, Corsica, Morocco, Tunisia, Mauritania. He pioneered Paleobotany of Cenozoic, especially Miocene, flora.

He is commemorated in the scientific name of a species of Moroccan lizard, Atlantolacerta andreanskyi.

== Publications ==
- Plantae ia Africa Boreali lectae II–III. Pécs: Dunántúl. 1937–1941.
- Az éghajlat megváltozásának hatása a növényzetre. Budapest: Stephaneum. 1939.
- Adatok Tunisz és Kelet-Algéria növényföldrajzához. Budapest: Bethlen Gábor. 1939.
- Száras növények. Budapest: Egyetemi ny. 1941.
- A növények elterjedése. Budapest: Egyetemi ny. 1941.
- A Földközi-tengervidék növényzetének biológiai spektrumáról. Budapest: Szent István Akadémia. 1941.
- Ősnövénytan. Budapest: Akadémiai. 1954.
- Die Flora der sarmatischen Stufe in Ungarn: Die paläoökologischen und zönologischen Beziehungen ihrer Entwicklungsgeschichte. Budapest: Akadémiai. 1959.
- Contributions à la connaissance de la flore de l’oligocène inférieur de la Hongrie et un essai sur la reconstitution de la végétation contemporaine. Budapest: Akadémiai. 1959.
- On the Upper Oligocene of Hungary: Analysis of the site at the Wind Brickyard. Eger. Budapest: Akadémiai. 1966.

== Sources ==
- Magyar életrajzi lexikon I. (A–K). ed. Kenyeres, Ágnes. Budapest. Akadémiai Kiadó. 1967. p. 35.
- Magyar nagylexikon II. (And–Bag). ed. Élesztős, László, Rostás, Sándor. Budapest. Akadémiai Kiadó. 1994. p. 28.
- Magyarország a XX. században IV.: Tudomány – Műszaki és természettudományok. ed. Kollega Tarsoly, István. Szekszárd. Babits. 1999. pp. 486 and 489.
