= Tolmács =

- Village/(község)
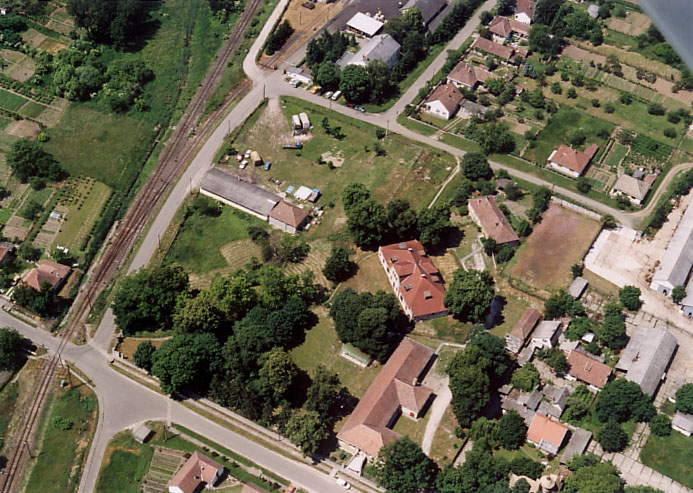
- Aerial view of Tolmács

- Coat of arms

- Location of Tolmács in Hungary
- Coordinates: 47°55′46″N 19°06′33″E
- Country: Hungary
- Region: Northern Hungary
- County: Nógrád County
- Subregion: Rétság

Government
  - Mayor: Ferenc Hajnis (FIDESZ-KDNP)

Area
  - Total: 12.24 km^{2} (4.73 sq mi)
- Elevation: 227 m (745 ft)

Population (1 Jan. 2014)
  - Total: 756
  - Density: 57.35/km^{2} (148.5/sq mi)
- Time zone: UTC+1 (CET)
  - Summer (DST): UTC+2 (CEST)
- Postal code: 2657
- Area code: 35
- Website: http://www.tolmacs.hu/

Tolmács is a village in Nógrád County, Northern Hungary Region, Hungary. The village is 54 kilometers north of the capital Budapest, located in the east–west valley of the Jenői and Tolmácsi streams.
