= Legénd =

Village in Nógrád County, Hungary

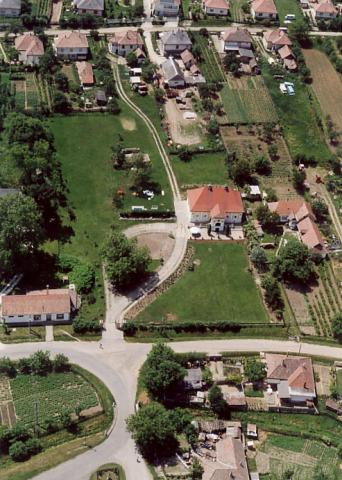
- A view of Legénd.

- Location of Legénd.
- Coordinates: 47°52′N 19°18′E
- Country: Hungary
- Region: Northern Hungary
- County: Nógrád

Government
  - Mayor: Tunkel Tamás Ferenc (Fidesz-KDNP)

Area
  - Total: 18.41 km^{2} (7.11 sq mi)

Population (2022)
  - Total: 491
  - Density: 26.7/km^{2} (69.1/sq mi)
- Time zone: UTC+1 (CET)
  - Summer (DST): UTC+2 (CEST)
- Postal code: 2619
- Area code: 35

Legénd is a village in Rétság district of Nógrád County, Hungary. Its population consisted of 491 inhabitants in 2022.
