= Nagyrada =

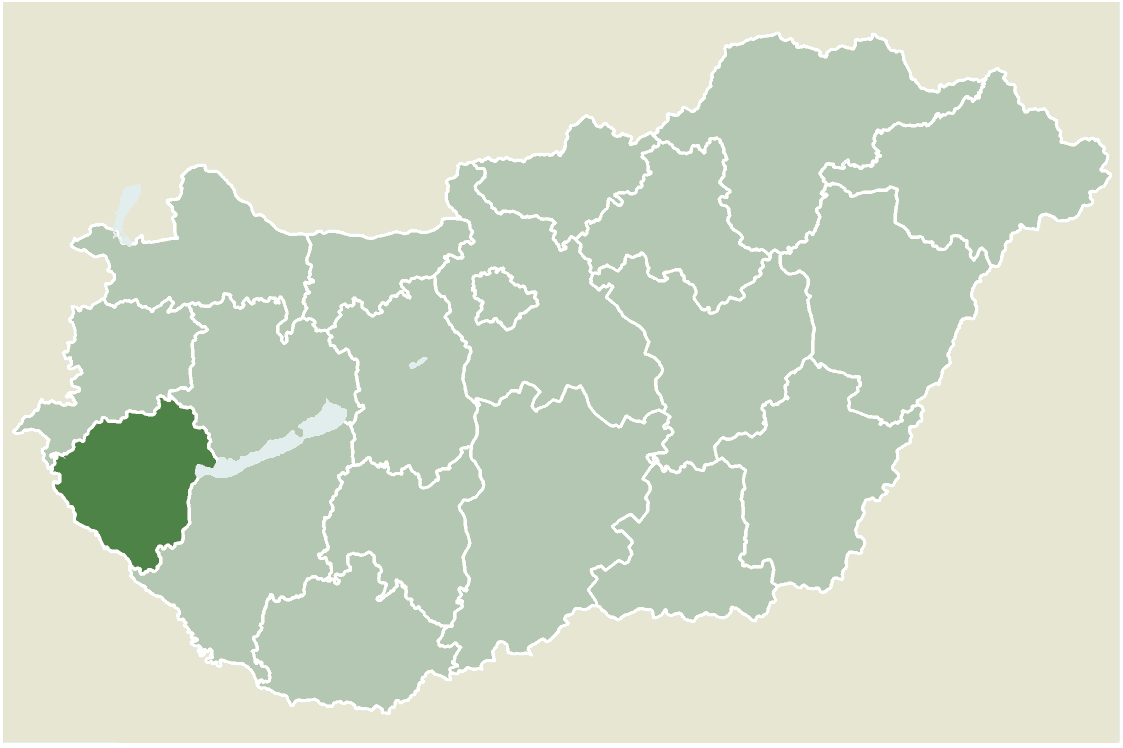
- Location of Zala county in Hungary

- Location of Nagyrada
- Coordinates: 46.62138°N 17.11105°E
- Country: Hungary
- County: Zala

Area
  - Total: 12.85 km^{2} (4.96 sq mi)

Population (2004)
  - Total: 533
  - Density: 41.47/km^{2} (107.4/sq mi)
- Time zone: UTC+1 (CET)
  - Summer (DST): UTC+2 (CEST)
- Postal code: 8746
- Area code: 93

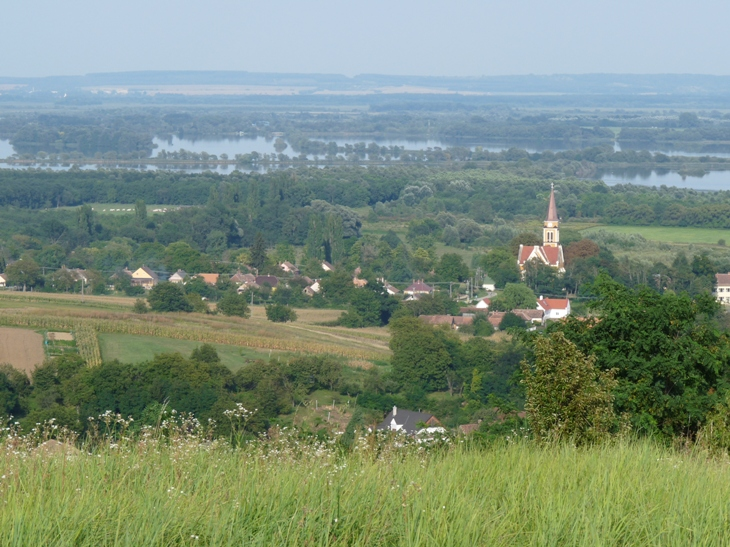
Nagyrada from a distance

Nagyrada is a village in Zala County, Hungary.
