= Tereske =

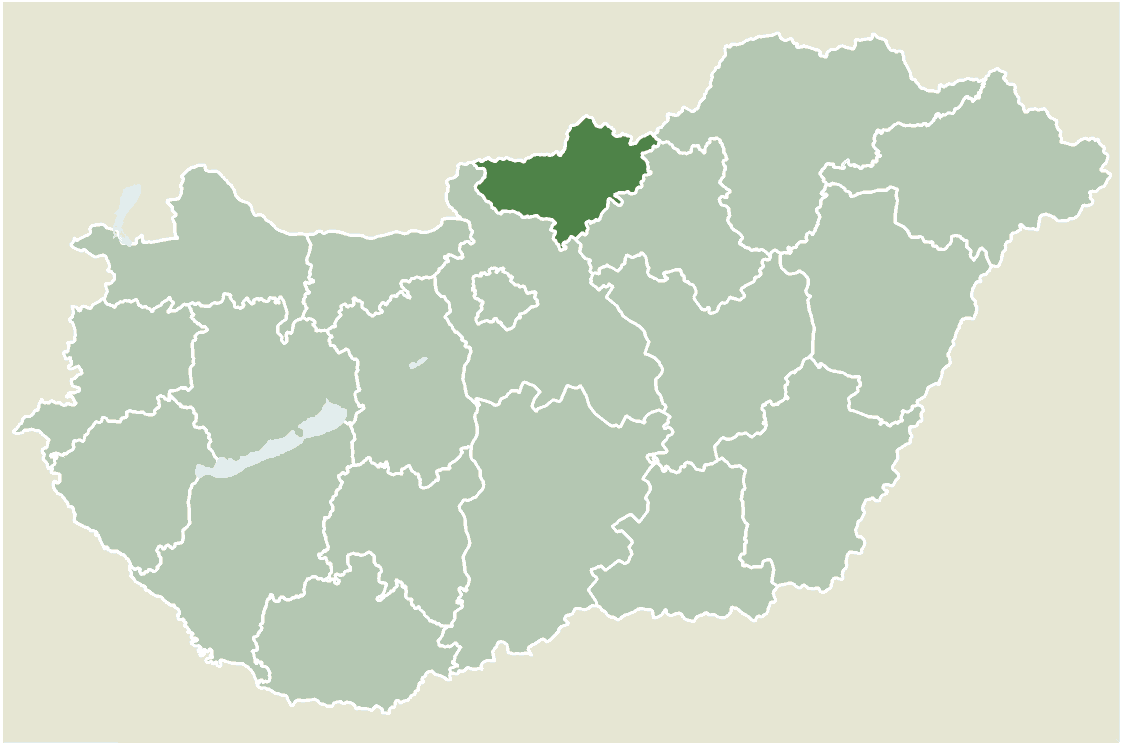
- Location of Nógrád county in Hungary

- Location of Tereske
- Coordinates: 47.95054°N 19.19268°E
- Country: Hungary
- County: Nógrád

Area
  - Total: 17.04 km^{2} (6.58 sq mi)

Population (2004)
  - Total: 714
  - Density: 41.9/km^{2} (109/sq mi)
- Time zone: UTC+1 (CET)
  - Summer (DST): UTC+2 (CEST)
- Postal code: 2652
- Area code: 35

Tereske is a village in Rétság District of Nógrád county, Hungary.

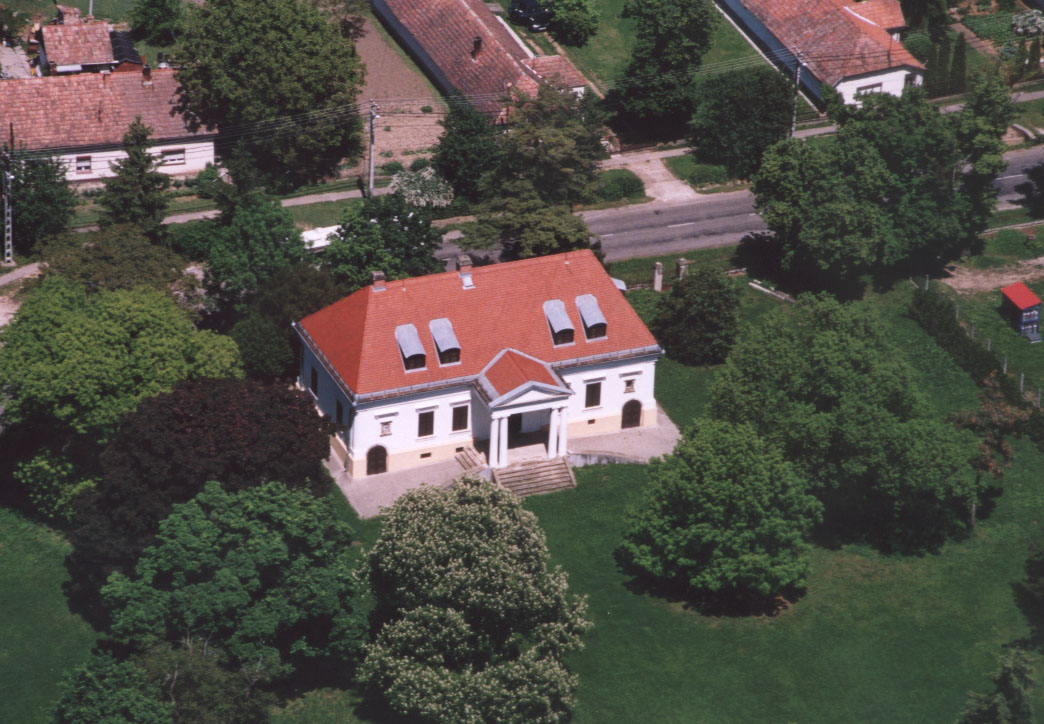
Aerial view from Tereske

== Etymology ==
The name is of Slavic origin - Trška, see also e.g. Trška Gora ("a vineyard hill") in Slovenia. 1205-1235 Abbas de losco Triskay (Triskai) mosanerio. The village was known in the past also as "Slovak Trška" (Totriske, Touttriske, Tot Tereske, Tottreske).

== Parochial church ==
The most attractive thing to see in the village is Tereske parochial church, which was built as a Benedictine abbey in romanesque style in the 11th century AD. The main sightseeing is the legend of Saint László Ladislaus I of Hungary on a mural on the north wall of the nave. It consists of four characteristic stages: two armies before the battle, fighting of St. László and the cumanian prince, the execution and the resting of St. László. King Matthias Corvinus of Hungary donated the monastery to his servient, Bajoni István, who rebuilt the church. From this time a pastoforium can be seen. In the 16th century an extra wall was erected before the mural, and later the church was renovated in Baroque style.

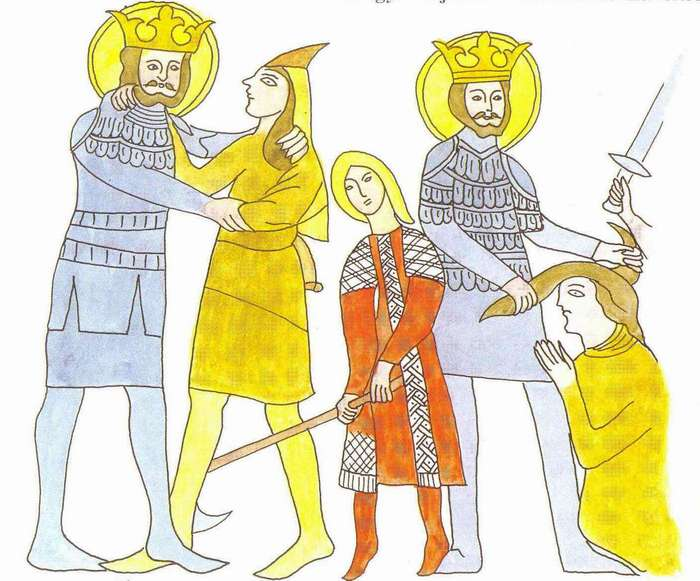
Detail from the Saint László Ladislaus I of Hungary legend, from a North-Hungary visiting book.
