= Nagyoroszi =

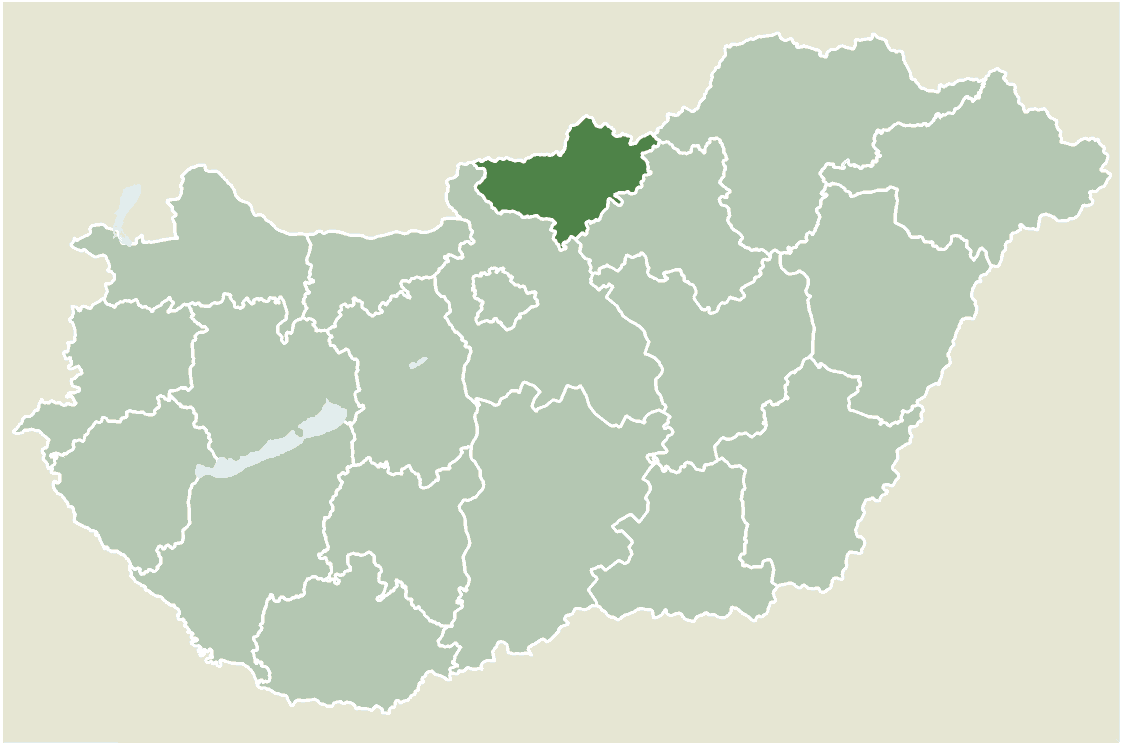
- Location of Nógrád county in Hungary

- Location of Nagyoroszi
- Coordinates: 48.00344°N 19.09055°E
- Country: Hungary
- County: Nógrád

Area
  - Total: 40.03 km^{2} (15.46 sq mi)

Population (2004)
  - Total: 2,273
  - Density: 56.78/km^{2} (147.1/sq mi)
- Time zone: UTC+1 (CET)
  - Summer (DST): UTC+2 (CEST)
- Postal code: 2645
- Area code: 35

Nagyoroszi is a village in Rétság district of Nógrád county, in northern Hungary.
