= Nemesrádó =

- Location within Hungary
- Coordinates: 46.77828°N 16.99411°E
- Country: Hungary
- County: Zala

Area
  - Total: 14.02 km^{2} (5.41 sq mi)

Population (2001)
  - Total: 343
  - Density: 24.5/km^{2} (63.4/sq mi)
- Time zone: UTC+1 (CET)
  - Summer (DST): UTC+2 (CEST)
- Postal code: 8915

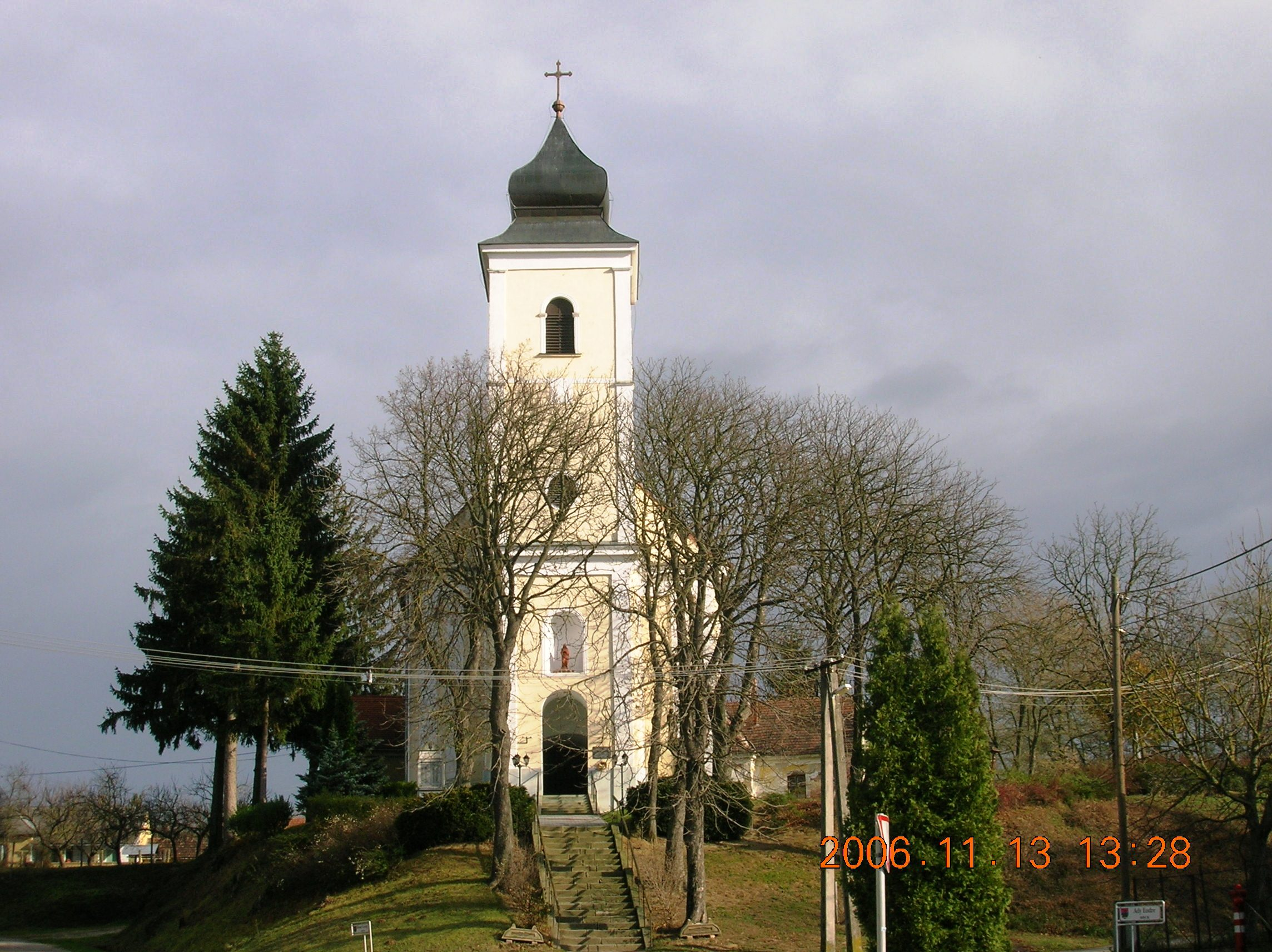
Holy Trinity Church

Nemesrádó is a village in Zala County, Hungary. It was called Rádó from 1952 until 1991 when it regained its original name. In the center of the village there's a Neo-Gothic temple.
