= Nógrádsáp =

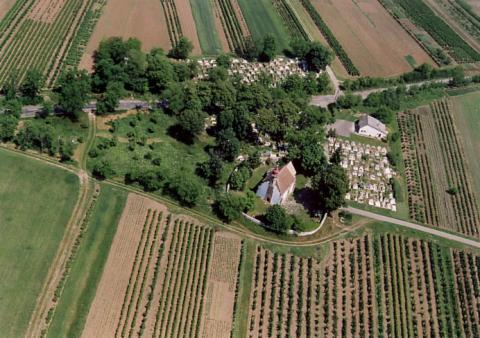

- Flag Coat of arms

- Location of Nógrádsáp in Hungary
- Coordinates: 47°50′23″N 19°21′18″E
- Country: Hungary
- Region: Northern Hungary
- County: Nógrád
- District: Rétság

Area
  - Total: 15.47 km^{2} (5.97 sq mi)

Population (2015)
  - Total: 811
  - Density: 52.4/km^{2} (136/sq mi)
- Time zone: UTC+1 (CET)
  - Summer (DST): UTC+2 (CEST)
- Postal code: 2685
- Area code: +36 35
- KSH code: 08387

Nógrádsáp is a village in Rétság district of Nógrád county, Hungary with 826 inhabitants (2014).
