= Nemesszentandrás =

- Location of Nemesszentandrás
- Coordinates: 46.77550°N 16.94688°E
- Country: Hungary
- County: Zala

Area
  - Total: 5.47 km^{2} (2.11 sq mi)

Population (2001)
  - Total: 281
  - Density: 51.4/km^{2} (133/sq mi)
- Time zone: UTC+1 (CET)
  - Summer (DST): UTC+2 (CEST)
- Postal code: 8925

Nemesszentandrás is a village in Zala County, Hungary.
