= Nemeshany =

- Flag Coat of arms

- Location of Veszprém county in Hungary

- Location of Nemeshany
- Coordinates: 47.07032°N 17.36531°E
- Country: Hungary
- County: Veszprém

Area
  - Total: 10.5 km^{2} (4.1 sq mi)

Population (2004)
  - Total: 450
  - Density: 42.85/km^{2} (111.0/sq mi)
- Time zone: UTC+1 (CET)
  - Summer (DST): UTC+2 (CEST)
- Postal code: 8471
- Area code: 87

Nemeshany is a village in Veszprém county, Hungary.
