= Nagypáli =

- Village
- Coat of arms
- Interactive map of Nagypáli
- Coordinates: 46°54′31″N 16°50′29.4″E
- Country: Hungary
- Region: Western Transdanubia
- County: Zala County

Government
  - Mayor: Tibor Köcse

Area
  - Total: 2.45 sq mi (6.34 km^{2})
- Elevation: 597 ft (182 m)

Population (2012)
  - Total: 469
  - Density: 191.6/sq mi (73.97/km^{2})
- Time zone: UTC+1 (CET)
  - Summer (DST): UTC+2 (CEST)
- Postal code: 8912
- Area code: 92
- Website: www.nagypali.eu

Nagypáli is a village in Zala County, Hungary.
