= Nemesgulács =

- Flag Coat of arms

- Location of Veszprém county in Hungary

- Location of Nemesgulács
- Coordinates: 46.83498°N 17.48403°E
- Country: Hungary
- County: Veszprém

Area
  - Total: 8.35 km^{2} (3.22 sq mi)

Population (2004)
  - Total: 1,052
  - Density: 125.98/km^{2} (326.3/sq mi)
- Time zone: UTC+1 (CET)
  - Summer (DST): UTC+2 (CEST)
- Postal code: 8284
- Area code: 87

Nemesgulács is a village in Veszprém county, Hungary.
