= Nézsa =

Nézsa Niža
- Village
- Flag Coat of arms

- Location of Nézsa
- Coordinates: 47.8458°N 19.29343°E
- Country: Hungary
- Region: Northern Hungary
- County: Nógrád
- District: Rétság

Area
  - Total: 18.67 km^{2} (7.21 sq mi)

Population (1 January 2025)
  - Total: 1,177
  - Density: 63.04/km^{2} (163.3/sq mi)
- Time zone: UTC+1 (CET)
  - Summer (DST): UTC+2 (CEST)
- Postal code: 2618
- Area code: (+36) 35
- Website: www.nezsa.hu

Nézsa (Slovak: Niža or Nežovce) is a village in Rétság district of Nógrád county, Hungary with 1,093 inhabitants (2014). It is about 50 kilometers from Budapest, on the southwestern border of Nógrád County, directly adjacent to Pest County.
