= Nagydobsza =

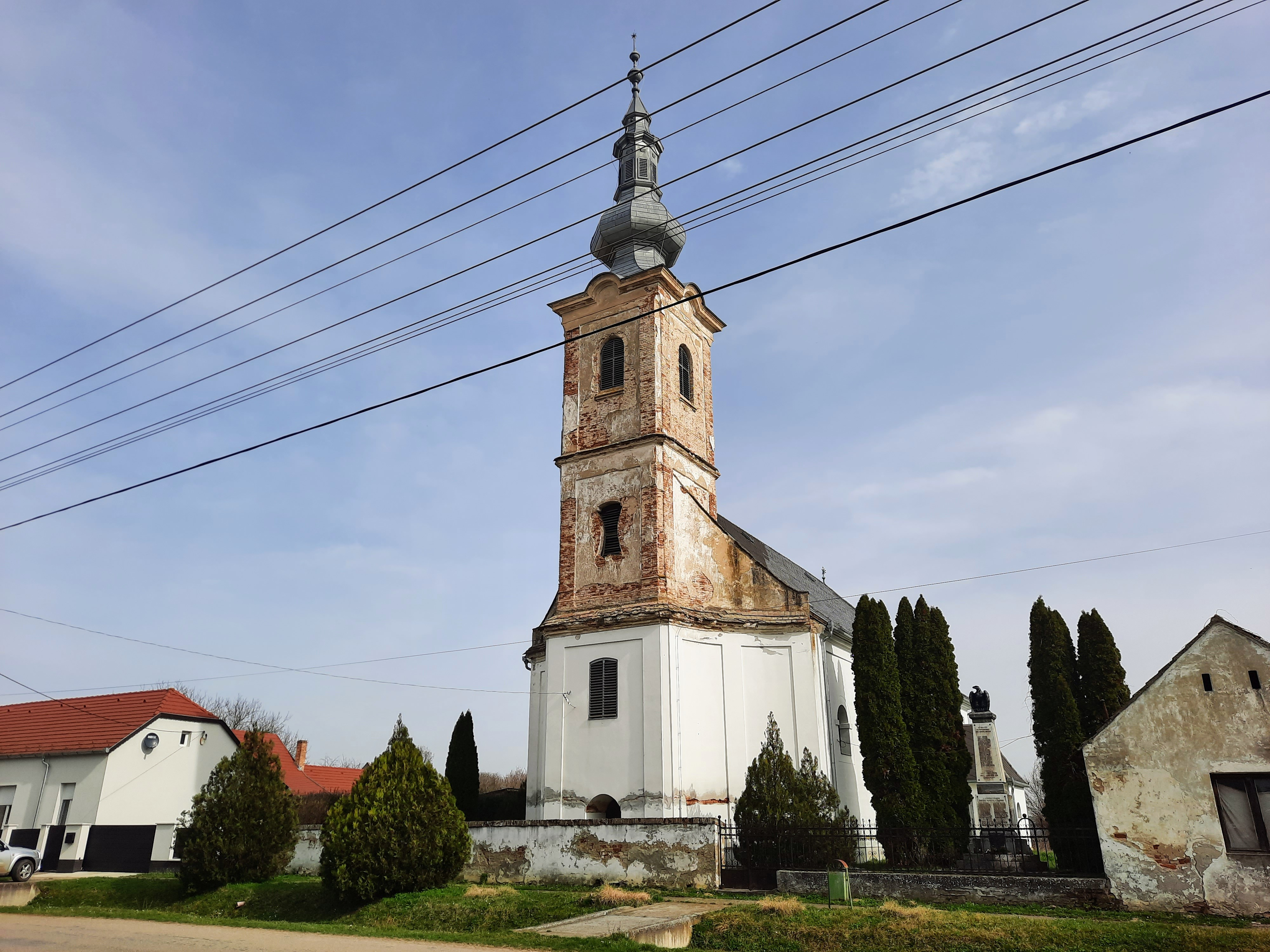

- Coat of arms

- Location of Nagydobsza
- Coordinates: 46°02′05″N 17°39′54″E
- Country: Hungary
- County: Baranya

Area
  - Total: 13.23 km^{2} (5.11 sq mi)

Population (2004)
  - Total: 686
  - Density: 51.85/km^{2} (134.3/sq mi)
- Time zone: UTC+1 (CET)
  - Summer (DST): UTC+2 (CEST)
- Postal code: 7985
- Area code: 73
- Website: http://nagydobsza.hu/

Nagydobsza is a village in Baranya county, Hungary.

== Location ==
Nagydobsza is located on the western border of Baranya county. The nearest cities are Szigetvár and Barcs, which are 11 kilometres and 19 kilometres away respectively.

=== Access ===
6-os főút (Highway 6) passes through the village, making it easily accessible from other parts of the country.

The Gyékényes-Pécs railway line passes by the village, but does not stop there. The closest railway connection is offered by the Kisdobsza stop, about 800 metres southwest of the village.
