= Nagygeresd =

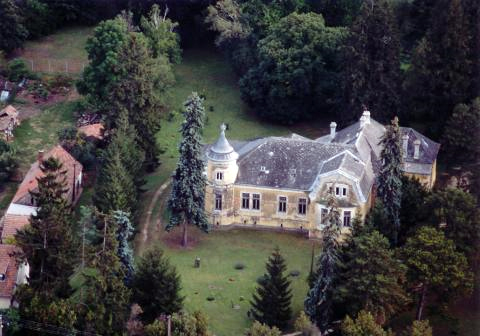

- Location of Nagygeresd
- Coordinates: 47.39384°N 16.92820°E
- Country: Hungary
- County: Vas

Area
  - Total: 9.4 km^{2} (3.6 sq mi)

Population (2004)
  - Total: 287
  - Density: 30.53/km^{2} (79.1/sq mi)
- Time zone: UTC+1 (CET)
  - Summer (DST): UTC+2 (CEST)
- Postal code: 9664
- Area code: 94
- Website: www.nagygeresd.regio.info.hu

Nagygeresd is a village in Vas county, Hungary with a population of 266 inhabitants by 1 January 2010.
