= Nemesládony =

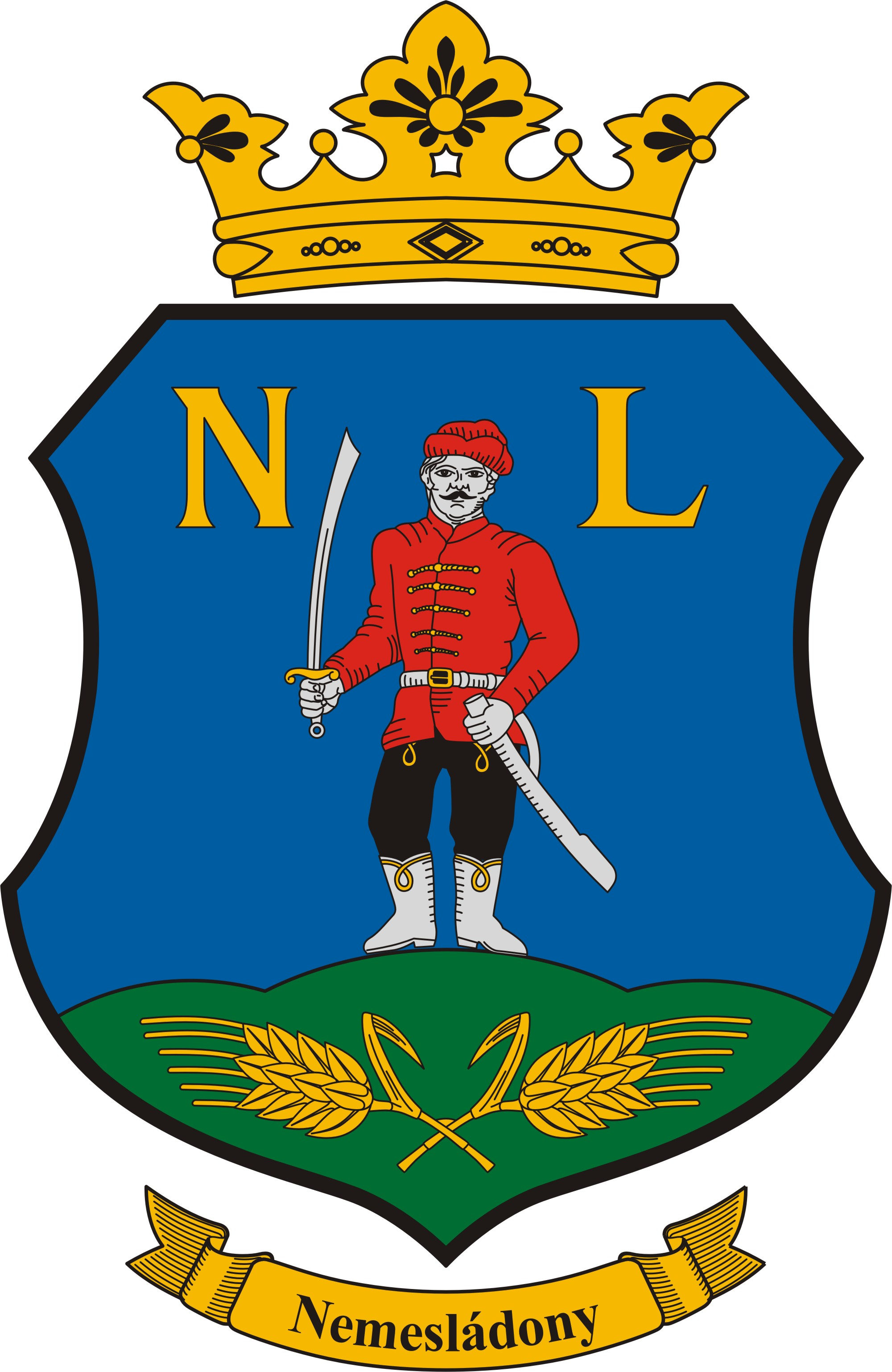
- Coat of arms

- Location of Nemesládony in Hungary
- Coordinates: 47.40058°N 16.88723°E
- Country: Hungary
- Region: Western Transdanubia
- County: Vas
- Subregion: Csepregi
- Rank: Village

Area
  - Total: 5.67 km^{2} (2.19 sq mi)

Population (1 January 2008)
  - Total: 122
  - Density: 21.5/km^{2} (55.7/sq mi)
- Time zone: UTC+1 (CET)
  - Summer (DST): UTC+2 (CEST)
- Postal code: 9663
- Area code: +36 94
- KSH code: 26240
- Website: http://nemesladony.hu/

Nemesládony is a village in Vas county, Hungary.
