= Felsőpetény =

Village in Nógrád County, Hungary

Coordinates: 47°53′N 19°11′E

Felsőpetény is a village in Nógrád County, Hungary with 571 inhabitants (2025).

Population by year
Year	Population
1870	574
1880	543
1890	583
1900	593
1910	647
1920	657
1930	774
1941	805
1949	746
1960	786
1970	922
1980	839
1990	753
2001	774
2011	639

In 2022, 96.1% of the population identified themselves as Hungarian, 39.5% as Slovak, 0.4% as Roma, 0.2% as German, 3.2% as other non-domestic nationality (3.9% did not declare; due to dual identities, the total may be greater than 100%).
