= Bánk =

Municipality in Nógrád County, Hungary

Coordinates: 47°55′28″N 19°10′31″E

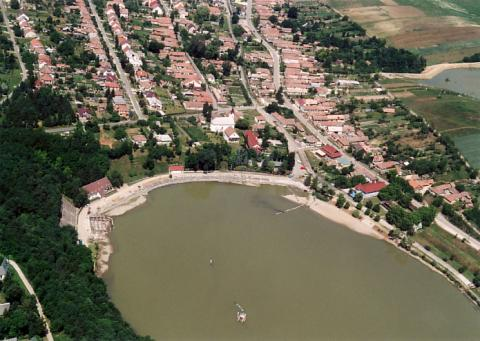
Bánk

Bánk is a village and municipality in the county (Hungarian: vármegye) of Nógrád, Hungary.

Population by year
Year	Population
1870	514
1880	489
1890	526
1900	550
1910	580
1920	638
1930	695
1941	711
1949	661
1960	656
1970	696
1980	750
1990	724
2001	687
2011	685
