= Diósjenő =

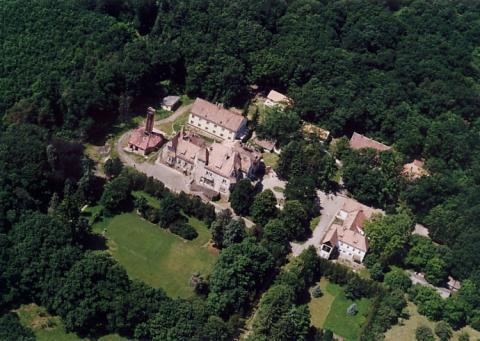

- Flag Coat of arms

- Location within Hungary
- Coordinates: 47°57′N 19°03′E
- Country: Hungary
- County: Nógrád

Area
  - Total: 57.5 km^{2} (22.2 sq mi)

Population (2001)
  - Total: 2,803
  - Density: 49/km^{2} (130/sq mi)
- Time zone: UTC+1 (CET)
  - Summer (DST): UTC+2 (CEST)
- Postal code: 2643
- Area code: 35

Diósjenő is a village in Nógrád county, Hungary. It is located about 60 kilometers north of Budapest, in the western part of the county, at the foot of Börzsöny and is surrounded by hills.

== History ==
The village was first mentioned in 1282. Its name comes from Jenő, the name of one of the seven tribes conquering present-day Hungary, while the word "diós" refers to walnut trees. The Hussites built a castle in the village. After the Ottoman era, 30 houses stood in the village in 1720.

== Tourist sights ==
- Roman Catholic church: built in the 15th century in Gothic style; rebuilt in 1788-89 in Baroque and Neoclassical style.
- Protestant church: built around 1850 in late Neoclassical style.
- Five bridges on the Jenő stream, built between 1914 and 1930 of stone, bricks and ferroconcrete.

== Famous people ==
- István Szentgyörgyi, actor (1842–1931)
