= Alsópetény =

Municipality in Nógrád County, Hungary

Coordinates: 47°53′N 19°15′E

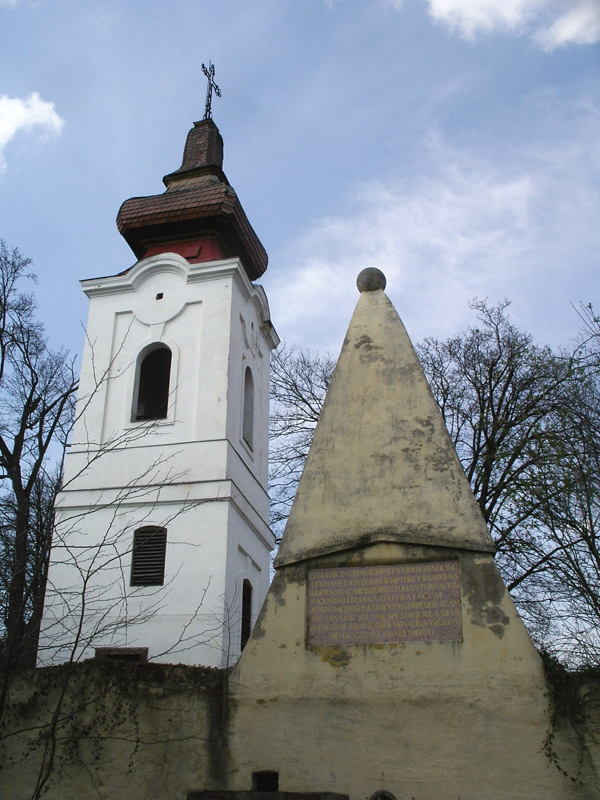
Werbőczy Memorial Pyramid in Alsópetény was erected in 1791. It is situated above a crypt and has a memorial plaque with a Latin inscription. It is in front of the Roman Catholic Church of St. Stephen the King.

Alsópetény (Slovak: Dolné Peťany) is a village and municipality in Nógrád County, Hungary.

Population by year
Year	Population
1870	733
1880	740
1890	774
1900	809
1910	873
1920	928
1930	899
1941	900
1949	944
1960	934
1970	984
1980	869
1990	764
2001	761
2011	679
