= Nógrád =

Nógrád Novohrad
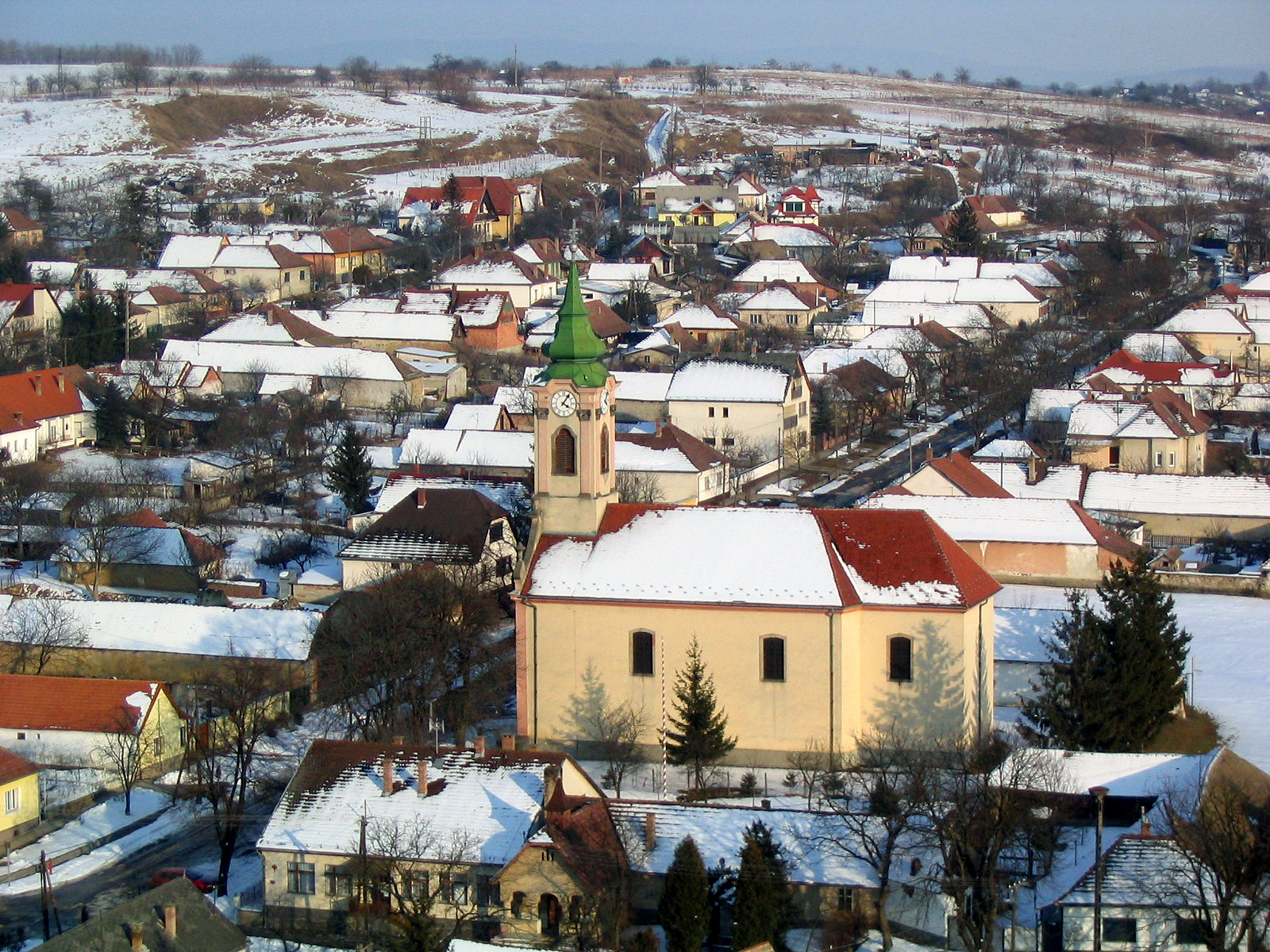

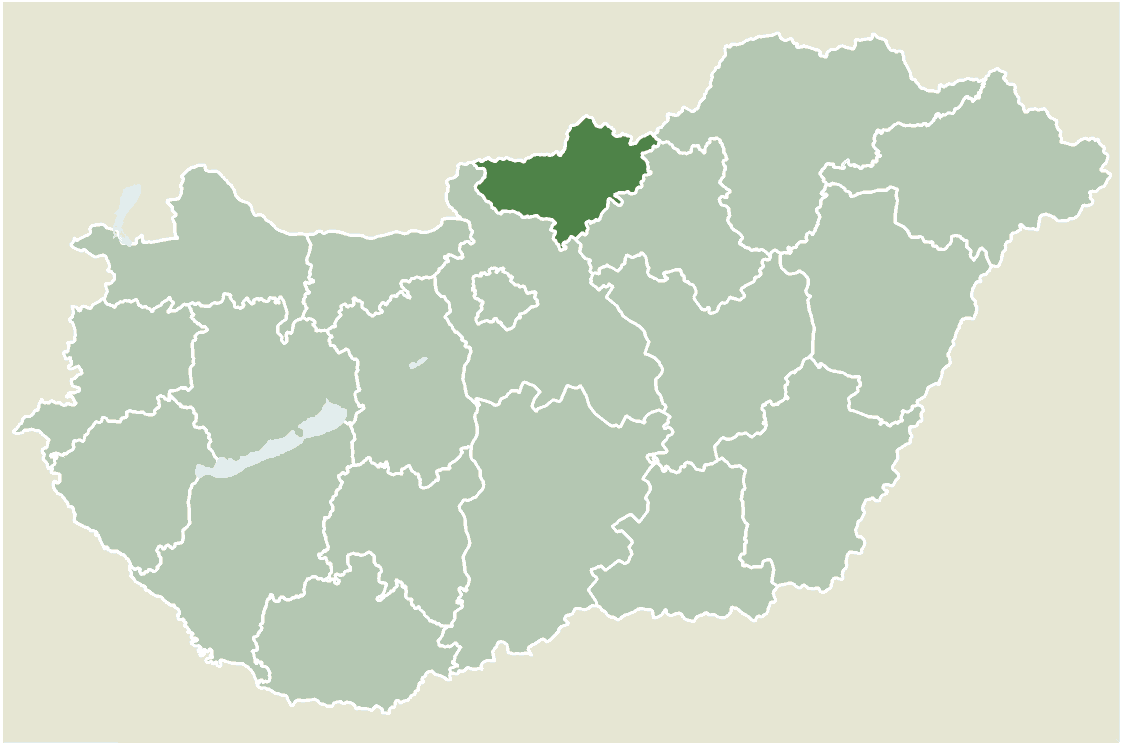
- Location of Nógrád county in Hungary

- Location of Nógrád
- Coordinates: 47.90482°N 19.05157°E
- Country: Hungary
- County: Nógrád

Area
  - Total: 29.52 km^{2} (11.40 sq mi)

Population (2004)
  - Total: 1,573
  - Density: 53.28/km^{2} (138.0/sq mi)
- Time zone: UTC+1 (CET)
  - Summer (DST): UTC+2 (CEST)
- Postal code: 2642
- Area code: 35

Nógrád (Slovak: Novohrad; German: Neuburg) is a village in Nógrád County, Hungary.

Besides roads, the village can be reached by train, on the Vác–Balassagyarmat railway line number 75, which stops at Nógrád railway station.

== Etymology ==
The name comes from Slavic Novgrad ("New Castle") from which evolved Slovak Novohrad (with the same meaning) and Hungarian Nógrád. 1138/1329 civitas Naugrad, around 1200 castrum Nougrad, 1217 castrum de Nevgrad. The village (1405 villa Newgrad) and the county was named after the castle.
