= Veszprém County 3rd constituency =

Parliamentary constituency in Hungary

- Constituency for the National Assembly
- Location of Veszprém county 03 within Veszprém county

- Location of Veszprém county within Hungary
- County: Veszprém County
- Population: 78,677 (2022)
- Major settlements: Tapolca

Current constituency
- Created: 2011
- Party: Tisza Party
- Member: Péter Balatincz
- Elected: 2026

The Veszprém County 3rd parliamentary constituency is one of the 106 constituencies into which the territory of Hungary is divided by Act CCIII of 2011, and in which voters can elect one member of parliament. The standard abbreviation of the name of the constituency is: Veszprém 03. OEVK. Seat: Tapolca.

== Area ==
The constituency includes the following settlements:

1. Ábrahámhegy
2. Ajka
3. Badacsonytomaj
4. Badacsonytördemic
5. Balatonederics
6. Balatonrendes
7. Bazsi
8. Bodorfa
9. Csabrendek
10. Dabronc
11. Gógánfa
12. Gyepükaján
13. Gyulakeszi
14. Halimba
15. Hegyesd
16. Hegymagas
17. Hetyefő
18. Hosztót
19. Kapolcs
20. Káptalanfa
21. Káptalantóti
22. Kékkút
23. Kisapáti
24. Kővágóörs
25. Lesencefalu
26. Lesenceistvánd
27. Lesencetomaj
28. Megyer
29. Mindszentkálla
30. Monostorapáti
31. Nagyvázsony
32. Nemesgulács
33. Nemeshany
34. Nemesvita
35. Nyirád
36. Öcs
37. Pula
38. Pusztamiske
39. Raposka
40. Révfülöp
41. Rigács
42. Salföld
43. Sáska
44. Sümeg
45. Sümegprága
46. Szentbékkálla
47. Szentimrefalva
48. Szigliget
49. Szőc
50. Taliándörögd
51. Tapolca
52. Ukk
53. Uzsa
54. Veszprémgalsa
55. Vigántpetend
56. Zalaerdőd
57. Zalagyömörő
58. Zalahaláp
59. Zalameggyes
60. Zalaszegvár

== Members of parliament ==
Name	Party	Term	Election
Jenő Lasztovicza	Fidesz-KDNP	2014–2015	Results of the 2014 parliamentary election
Lajos Rig	Jobbik	2015–2018	Results of the 2015 by-election
Zoltán Fenyvesi	Fidesz-KDNP	2018–2022	Results of the 2018 parliamentary election
Tibor Navracsics	Fidesz-KDNP	2022–2026	Results of the 2022 parliamentary election
Péter Balatincz	Tisza Party	2026 – present	Results of the 2026 parliamentary election: 54.00%

== Demographics ==
Historical population
Year	Pop.	±%
2011	84,235	—
2022	78,677	−6.6%

The demographics of the constituency are as follows. The population of constituency No. 3 of Veszprém County was 78,677 on October 1, 2022. The population of the constituency decreased by 5,558 between the 2011 and 2022 censuses. Based on the age composition, the majority of people in the constituency are middle-aged people with 29,622 people, while the fewest are children with 12,245 people. 81.4% of the population of the constituency has internet access.

According to the highest level of completed education, those with a high school diploma are the most numerous, with 21,032 people, followed by skilled workers with 20,330 people.

According to economic activity, almost half of the population is employed, 38,257 people, the second most significant group is inactive earners, who are mainly pensioners, with 21,476 people.

The most significant ethnic group in the constituency is German with 1,280 people and Gypsy with 525 people. The proportion of foreign citizens without Hungarian citizenship is 1.2%.

According to religious composition, the largest religion of the residents of the constituency is Roman Catholic (28,593 people), and there is also a significant community of Calvinists (2,075 people). The number of those not belonging to a religious community is also significant (5,998 people), the second largest group in the constituency after the Roman Catholic religion.

== Sources ==
- ↑ Vjt.: "2011. évi CCIII. törvény az országgyűlési képviselők választásáról". Nemzeti Jogszabálytár. Magyar Közlöny Lap- és Könyvkiadó Kft.
- ↑ KSH: "Az országgyűlési egyéni választókerületek adatai". Népszámlálás 2011. Központi Statisztikai Hivatal.
