= List of populated places in Hungary (Z) =

This is a list of cities, towns and villages of Hungary

KEY: T = Town ; V = Village

Name	Rank	County	District	Population	Post code
Zabar	V	Nógrád	Salgótarjáni	560	3124
Zádor	V	Baranya	Szigetvári	394	7976
Zádorfalva	V	Borsod-Abaúj-Zemplén	Kazincbarcikai	529	3726
Zagyvarékas	V	Jász-Nagykun-Szolnok	Szolnoki	3,784	5051
Zagyvaszántó	V	Heves	Hatvani	952	3031
Záhony	T	Szabolcs-Szatmár-Bereg	Kisvárdai	4,807	4625
Zajk	V	Zala	Letenyei	237	8868
Zajta	V	Szabolcs-Szatmár-Bereg	Fehérgyarmati	442	4974
Zákány	V	Somogy	Csurgói	1,278	8852
Zákányfalu	V	Somogy	Csurgói	613	8853
Zákányszék	V	Csongrád	Mórahalmi	2,810	6787
Zala	V	Somogy	Tabi	272	8660
Zalaapáti	V	Zala	Keszthely–Hévízi	1,704	8741
Zalabaksa	V	Zala	Lenti	670	8971
Zalabér	V	Zala	Zalaszentgróti	740	8798
Zalaboldogfa	V	Zala	Zalaegerszegi	356	8992
Zalacsány	V	Zala	Zalaszentgróti	992	8782
Zalacséb	V	Zala	Zalaegerszegi	566	8996
Zalaegerszeg	county seat	Zala	Zalaegerszegi	62,158	8900
Zalaerdod	V	Veszprém	Sümegi	317	8344
Zalagyömörő	V	Veszprém	Sümegi	496	8349
Zalahaláp	V	Veszprém	Tapolcai	1,077	8308
Zalaháshágy	V	Zala	Zalaegerszegi	411	8997
Zalaigrice	V	Zala	Zalaegerszegi	135	8761
Zalaistvánd	V	Zala	Zalaegerszegi	414	8932
Zalakaros	T	Zala	Nagykanizsai	1,566	8749
Zalakomár	V	Zala	Nagykanizsai	3,182	8933
Zalaköveskút	V	Zala	Keszthely–Hévízi	29	8354
Zalalövő	T	Zala	Zalaegerszegi	3,258	8999
Zalameggyes	V	Veszprém	Sümegi	56	8348
Zalamerenye	V	Zala	Nagykanizsai	207	8747
Zalasárszeg	V	Zala	Nagykanizsai	95	8756
Zalaszabar	V	Zala	Nagykanizsai	627	8743
Zalaszántó	V	Zala	Keszthely–Hévízi	1,034	8353
Zalaszegvár	V	Veszprém	Sümegi	149	8476
Zalaszentbalázs	V	Zala	Nagykanizsai	919	8772
Zalaszentgrót	T	Zala	Zalaszentgróti	7,881	8790
Zalaszentgyörgy	V	Zala	Zalaegerszegi	418	8994
Zalaszentiván	V	Zala	Zalaegerszegi	1,068	8921
Zalaszentjakab	V	Zala	Nagykanizsai	386	8827
Zalaszentlászló	V	Zala	Zalaszentgróti	848	8788
Zalaszentlorinc	V	Zala	Zalaegerszegi	298	8921
Zalaszentmárton	V	Zala	Keszthely–Hévízi	74	8764
Zalaszentmihály	V	Zala	Zalaegerszegi	1,052	8936
Zalaszombatfa	V	Zala	Lenti	61	8969
Zaláta	V	Baranya	Sellyei	318	7839
Zalatárnok	V	Zala	Zalaegerszegi	793	8947
Zalaújlak	V	Zala	Nagykanizsai	134	8822
Zalavár	V	Zala	Keszthely–Hévízi	959	8392
Zalavég	V	Zala	Zalaszentgróti	430	8792
Zalkod	V	Borsod-Abaúj-Zemplén	Sárospataki	289	3957
Zamárdi	V	Somogy	Siófoki	2,298	8621
Zámoly	V	Fejér	Székesfehérvári	2,234	8081
Zánka	V	Veszprém	Balatonfüredi	908	8251
Zaránk	V	Heves	Hevesi	1,453	3296
Závod	V	Tolna	Bonyhádi	341	7182
Zebecke	V	Zala	Lenti	88	8957
Zebegény	V	Pest	Szobi	1,207	2627
Zemplénagárd	V	Borsod-Abaúj-Zemplén	Bodrogközi	927	3977
Zengővárkony	V	Baranya	Pécsváradi	414	7720
Zichyújfalu	V	Fejér	Gárdonyi	990	8112
Zics	V	Somogy	Tabi	410	8672
Ziliz	V	Borsod-Abaúj-Zemplén	Edelényi	412	3794
Zimány	V	Somogy	Kaposvári	664	7471
Zirc	T	Veszprém	Zirci	7,400	8420
Zók	V	Baranya	Szentlorinci	291	7671
Zomba	V	Tolna	Szekszárdi	2,335	7173
Zubogy	V	Borsod-Abaúj-Zemplén	Kazincbarcikai	596	3723

== Notes ==
- Cities marked with * have several different post codes, the one here is only the most general one.
