= Ajka District =

Ajka District Ajkai járás
- District
- Coat of arms

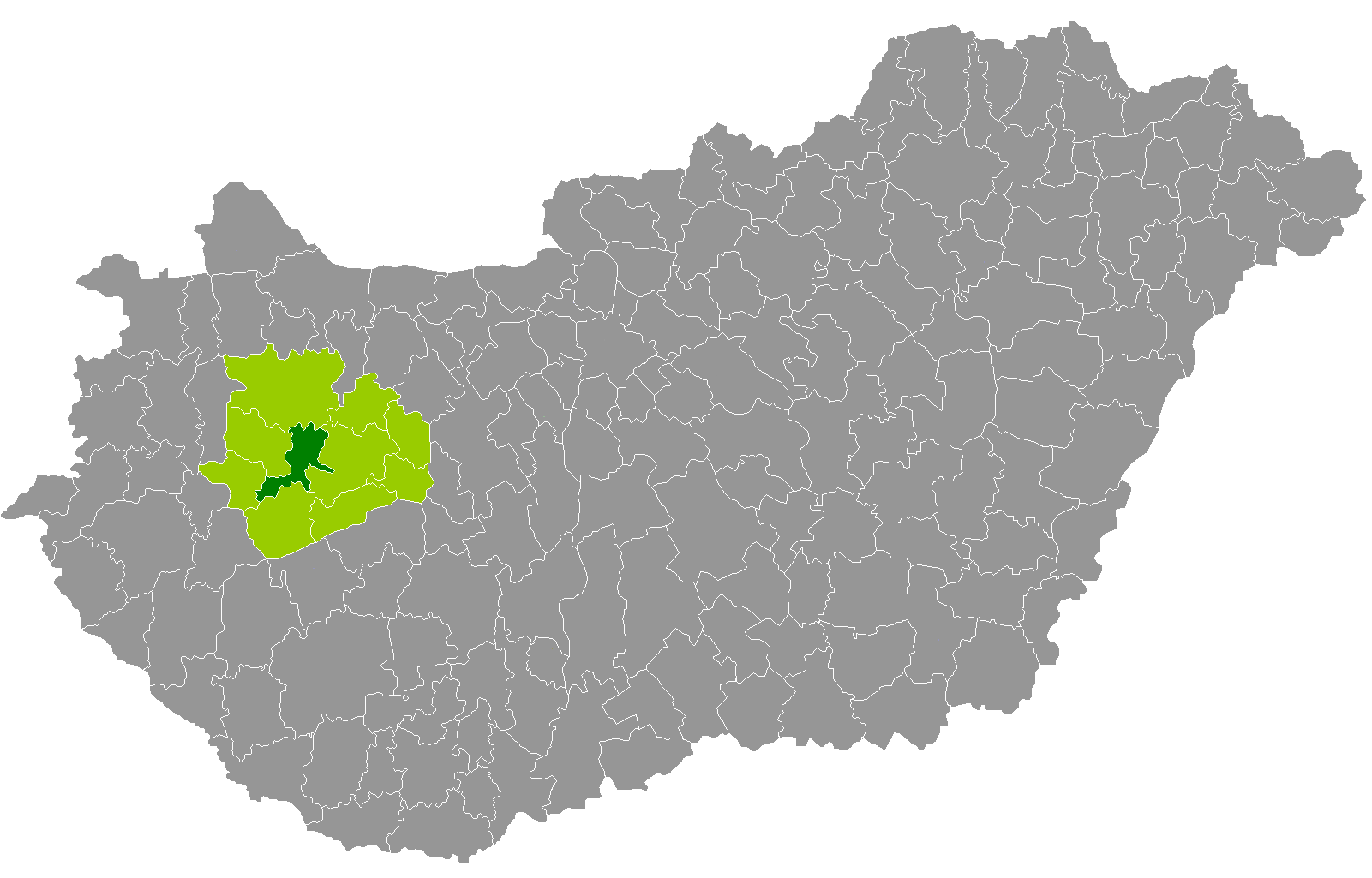
- Ajka District within Hungary and Veszprém County.
- Country: Hungary
- County: Veszprém
- District seat: Ajka

Area
  - Total: 320.71 km^{2} (123.83 sq mi)
  - Rank: 7th in Veszprém

Population (2011 census)
  - Total: 39,160
  - Rank: 3rd in Veszprém
  - Density: 122/km^{2} (320/sq mi)

Ajka (Hungarian: Ajkai járás) is a district in central-western part of Veszprém County. Ajka is also the name of the town where the district seat is found. The district is located in the Central Transdanubia Statistical Region.

== Geography ==
Ajka District borders with Pápa District to the north, Veszprém District to the east, Tapolca District to the south, Sümeg District and Devecser District to the west. The number of the inhabited places in Ajka District is 11.

== Municipalities ==
The district has 1 town and 10 villages.

- **Ajka** – district seat
- Csehbánya
- Farkasgyepű
- Halimba
- Kislőd
- Magyarpolány
- Nyirád
- Öcs
- Szőc
- Úrkút
- Városlőd

The bolded municipality is city.

== See also ==
- List of cities and towns in Hungary
