= Zoltán Fenyvesi =

Hungarian politician

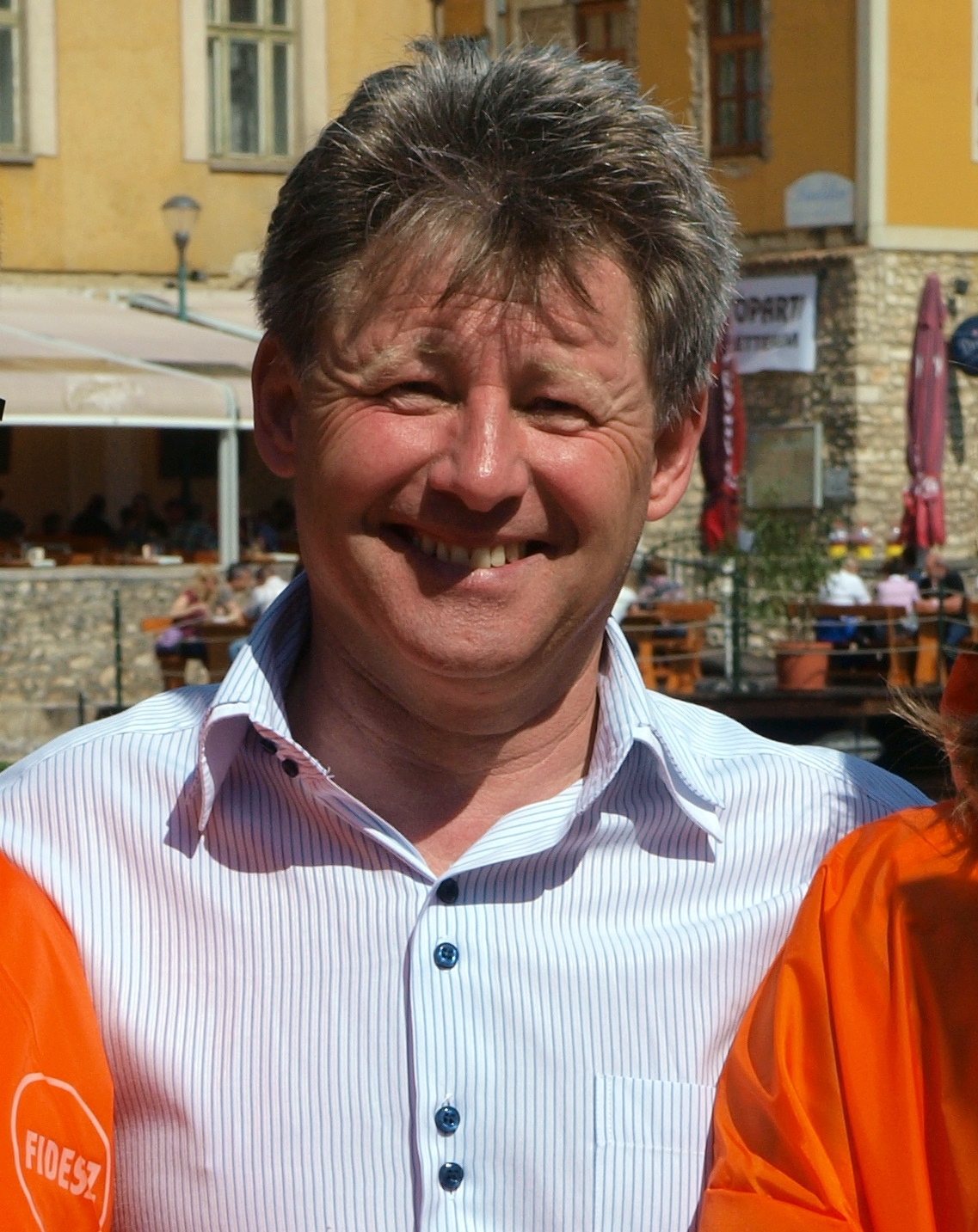

Member of the National Assembly
- In office 8 May 2018 – 1 May 2022

Personal details
- Born: 14 October 1964 (age 61) Ajka, Hungary
- Party: Fidesz (since 1997); KDNP (since 2006)
- Spouse: Zsuzsanna Fenyvesiné Molnár
- Children: two
- Profession: teacher

Zoltán Fenyvesi (born 14 October 1964) is a Hungarian teacher and politician. He was a member of National Assembly of Hungary (Országgyűlés) from 2018 to 2022, representing Tapolca (Individual Constituency No. 3 of Veszprém County). He is a member of Fidesz.

== Profession ==
He completed his primary education at the primary school in Ajkarendek (today a borough of Ajka). He finished his secondary studies at the Czuczor Gergely Benedictine Secondary Grammar School of Győr in 1983. In 1987, he graduated as a primary school German teacher at the Eötvös József Teacher Training College in Baja, and in 1991 as a primary school teacher majoring in history at the Berzsenyi Dániel Teacher Training College in Szombathely. Subsequently, in 1998, he passed the public education manager's examination at the Faculty of Natural and Social Sciences of the Budapest University of Technology (BME). In 2002, he graduated from the Faculty of Arts of the Eötvös Loránd University with a degree in history. He speaks German.

== Political career ==
Fenyvesi joined Fidesz and Christian Democratic People's Party (KDNP) in 1997 and 2006, respectively. He was a member of the local representative body of his birthplace Ajka from 1998 to 2014. He served as a member and vice-president of Veszprém County Assembly between 2014 and 2018. Fenyvesi was candidate for Fidesz in the April 2015 by-election in Tapolca constituency, which was held following the death of MP Jenő Lasztovicza. Fenyvesi was narrowly defeated by Jobbik candidate Lajos Rig, which was the ruling party's second surprising defeat in that year.

Fenyvesi was again nominated his party's candidate in Tapolca during the 2018 Hungarian parliamentary election; this time he defeated Lajos Rig by margin of victory of 6 percent. In the parliament, Fenyvesi was involved in the Committee on European Affairs and the National Cohesion Committee from May 2018 to May 2022. He was also vice-chairman of the latter committee since October 2018. In addition, he was a member of the Subcommittee on the Implementation, Social and Economic Impact of Laws and Deregulation Processes of the National Cohesion Committee. For the 2022 Hungarian parliamentary election, Fenyvesi was replaced by Tibor Navracsics as candidate of Fidesz in Tapolca (Veszprém County 3rd constituency). Fenyvesi admitted "Navracsics has a better chance of defeating of joint opposition candidate Lajos Rig". Navracsics ultimately won the mandate.
