= 2023 FIA European Rallycross Championship =

FIA European Rallycross Championship season

The 2023 FIA European Rallycross Championship was the 48th season of the FIA European Rallycross Championship. The championship consisted of three classes: RX1 and RX3, as well as the RX2e support series for the FIA World Rallycross Championship.

The championship began on 29 April at the Nyirád Racing Center in Hungary, and ended on 20 August at Estering in Germany. Anton Marklund won the RX1 championship for the third time. Damian Litwinowicz won his first RX3 championship. Nils Andersson won his first RX2e championship.

== Calendar ==
On 7 December 2022, the provisional 2023 calendar was announced during the FIA World Motorsport Council decisions. A calendar update was issued on 3 March 2023.

Rnd	Event	Date	Venue	Class	Winner	Team
1	Euro RX of Hungary	29–30 Apr	Nyirád Racing Center, Nyirád	RX1	(Latvia) Jānis Baumanis	RX Team Latvia
1	Euro RX of Hungary	29–30 Apr	Nyirád Racing Center, Nyirád	RX3	(Poland) Damian Litwinowicz	(Poland) Volland Racing
2	Euro RX of Portugal	3–4 June	Pista Automóvel de Montalegre, Montalegre	RX1	(Belgium) Enzo Ide	(Poland) Volland Racing
2	Euro RX of Portugal	3–4 June	Pista Automóvel de Montalegre, Montalegre	RX3	(Poland) Damian Litwinowicz	(Poland) Volland Racing
3	Euro RX of Norway	17–18 June	Lånkebanen, Hell	RX1	(Norway) Sivert Svardal	(Norway) Sivert Svardal
3	Euro RX of Norway	17–18 June	Lånkebanen, Hell	RX2e	(Sweden) Isak Sjökvist	(Sweden) #Yellowsquad
3	Euro RX of Norway	17–18 June	Lånkebanen, Hell	RX3	(Germany) Nils Volland	(Poland) Volland Racing
4	Euro RX of Sweden	1–2 July	Höljesbanan, Höljes	RX1	(United Kingdom) Patrick O'Donovan	(United Kingdom) Team RX Racing
4	Euro RX of Sweden	1–2 July	Höljesbanan, Höljes	RX2e	(Norway) Ole Henry Steinsholt	(Norway) Ole Henry Steinsholt
4	Euro RX of Sweden	1–2 July	Höljesbanan, Höljes	RX3	(Norway) Espen Isaksætre	(Poland) Volland Racing
5	Euro RX of the United Kingdom	22–23 July	Lydden Hill Race Circuit, Canterbury	RX2e	(Finland) Tommi Hallman	(Finland) SET Promotion
6	(Belgium) Euro RX of Benelux	5–6 August	Circuit Jules Tacheny Mettet, Mettet	RX1	(Sweden) Anton Marklund	(Finland) SET Promotion
6	(Belgium) Euro RX of Benelux	5–6 August	Circuit Jules Tacheny Mettet, Mettet	RX2e	(Sweden) Johan Kristoffersson (Note: Johan Kristoffersson won the event. Because he was ineligible to score points as he participated as a guest driver, second-placed driver Mikaela Åhlin-Kottulinsky was awarded the points for winning the event.)	(Sweden) Kristoffersson Motorsport
7	Euro RX of Germany	19–20 August	Estering, Buxtehude	RX1	(Latvia) Jānis Baumanis	RX Team Latvia
7	Euro RX of Germany	19–20 August	Estering, Buxtehude	RX2e	(Finland) Tommi Hallman	(Finland) SET Promotion
7	Euro RX of Germany	19–20 August	Estering, Buxtehude	RX3	(France) Dylan Dufas (Note: Jens Hvaal finished first, but was later disqualified for having incorrectly fitted shoulder harnesses. Dylan Dufas inherited the win.)	(France) Team RX Evolution

== Series News ==
- The RX2e class joined the European championship, having previously been a part of the world championship.
- The ZEROID X1 car used in the Rx2e class received a power increase from 250 kW to 270 kW, with an additional 80 kW being available to the drivers in a "boost mode" to aid overtaking.

== Entries ==
=== RX1 ===
Constructor	Team	Car	No.	Driver	Rounds	Ref
Audi	(Hungary) Kárai Motorsport Sportgyesület	Audi A1	39	(Hungary) Zoltán Koncseg	All	
Audi	(Norway) Andreas Bakkerud	Audi S1	13	(Norway) Andreas Bakkerud	1	
Audi	(Sweden) JC Raceteknik	Audi S1	13	(Norway) Andreas Bakkerud	4	
Audi	(Sweden) JC Raceteknik	Audi S1	57	(Sweden) Mats Öhman	4	
Audi	(Sweden) JC Raceteknik	Audi S1	444	(Sweden) Robin Larsson	4	
Audi	(Hungary) Kárai Motorsport Sportgyesület	Audi S1	73	(Hungary) Tamás Kárai	All	
Audi	(Poland) Volland Racing	Audi S1	91	(Belgium) Enzo Ide	All	
Audi	(Poland) Volland Racing	Audi S1	95	(Switzerland) Yury Belevskiy	5	
Ford	(Finland) SET Promotion	Ford Fiesta	1	(Sweden) Anton Marklund	All	
Ford	(Sweden) Linus Östlund	Ford Fiesta	18	(Sweden) Linus Östlund	4	
Ford	(Denmark) Linneman Promotion	Ford Fiesta	33	(Denmark) Ulrik Linnemann	1	
Ford	(Hungary) Nyirád Motorsport KFT	Ford Fiesta	50	(Hungary) Attila Mózer	All	
Ford	(Hungary) Nyirád Motorsport KFT	Ford Fiesta	51	(Hungary) Márk Mózer	1, 4	
Ford	(Norway) Frank Valle	Ford Fiesta	67	(Norway) Frank Valle	3–4	
Ford	(Norway) Sverre Isachsen	Ford Fiesta	70	(Norway) Sverre Isachsen	3	
Ford	(Italy) Werner Gurschler	Ford Fiesta	80	(Italy) Werner Gurschler	6	
Hyundai	(Sweden) Hedströms Motorsport	Hyundai i20	8	(Sweden) Peter Hedström	6	
Hyundai	(Sweden) Hedströms Motorsport	Hyundai i20	12	(Sweden) Anders Michalak	4	
Hyundai	(Finland) Betomik Racing Team	Hyundai i20	10	(Finland) Mikko Ikonen	5–6	
Hyundai	(Norway) Hans-Jøran Østreng	Hyundai i20	85	(Norway) Hans-Jøran Østreng	1, 3–6	
Peugeot	RX Team Latvia	Peugeot 208	6	(Latvia) Jānis Baumanis	All	
Peugeot	(United Kingdom) Team RX Racing	Peugeot 208	7	(United Kingdom) Patrick O'Donovan	All	
Peugeot	(Hungary) Korda Racing KFT	Peugeot 208	22	(Hungary) Máté Benyó	All	
Peugeot	(Hungary) Speedbox Racing Team KFT	Peugeot 208	27	(Hungary) László Kiss	1	
Peugeot	(France) DA Racing	Peugeot 208	88	(France) Anthony Pelfrene	2	
Peugeot	(France) Nicolas Briand	Peugeot 208	99	(France) Nicolas Briand	4	
Peugeot	(Portugal) José Oliveira	Peugeot 208	110	(Portugal) José Oliveira	2	
Proton	(United Kingdom) Team RX Racing	Proton Iriz	2	(Republic of Ireland) Oliver O'Donovan	1, 6	
Proton	(United Kingdom) Team RX Racing	Proton Iriz	4	(United Kingdom) Stephen Hill	2	
Renault	(France) Pascal Lambec	Renault Clio	19	(France) Pascal Lambec	4, 6	
SEAT	(Germany) ALL-INKL.COM Münnich Motorsport	SEAT Ibiza	38	(Germany) Mandie August	All	
SEAT	(Germany) ALL-INKL.COM Münnich Motorsport	SEAT Ibiza	77	(Germany) René Münnich	All	
Škoda	(Lithuania) TSK Baltijos Sportas	Škoda Fabia	55	(Lithuania) Paulius Pleskovas	1–2, 4–6	
Volkswagen	(Czech Republic) KRTZ Motorsport ACCR Czech Team	Volkswagen Polo	11	(Czech Republic) Aleš Fučik	1, 6	
Volkswagen	(Norway) Sivert Svardal	Volkswagen Polo	24	(Norway) Sivert Svardal	All	
Volkswagen	(Denmark) Linneman Promotion	Volkswagen Polo	33	(Denmark) Ulrik Linnemann	2, 4–6	
Volkswagen	(Norway) Sætnan Motorsport	Volkswagen Scirocco	30	(Norway) Tom André Sætnan	3–4	

=== RX2e ===
Constructor	Team	Car	No.	Drivers	Rounds	Ref
QEV Technologies	(Sweden) Kristoffersson Motorsport	ZEROID X1	3	(Sweden) Johan Kristoffersson	4	
QEV Technologies	(Sweden) Kristoffersson Motorsport	ZEROID X1	96	(Norway) Ole Christian Veiby	4	
QEV Technologies	(Sweden) #YELLOWSQUAD	ZEROID X1	2	(United Kingdom) Catie Munnings	1–3	
QEV Technologies	(Sweden) #YELLOWSQUAD	ZEROID X1	55	(Australia) Molly Taylor	4–5	
QEV Technologies	(Sweden) #YELLOWSQUAD	ZEROID X1	82	(Sweden) Isak Sjökvist	All	
QEV Technologies	(Spain) Zeroid Motorsport	ZEROID X1	5	(Spain) Pablo Suárez	All	
QEV Technologies	(Spain) Zeroid Motorsport	ZEROID X1	28	(Sweden) Filip Thorén	All	
QEV Technologies	(Spain) Zeroid Motorsport	ZEROID X1	97	(Spain) Cristina Gutiérrez	1–2	
QEV Technologies	(China) RuiSi Racing	ZEROID X1	11	(China) Yan Zhang	5	
QEV Technologies	(Sweden) Construction Equipment Dealer Team	ZEROID X1	12	(Sweden) Klara Andersson	5	
QEV Technologies	(Sweden) Construction Equipment Dealer Team	ZEROID X1	68	(Finland) Niclas Grönholm	5	
QEV Technologies	(Belgium) VMV Racing	ZEROID X1	13	(Belgium) Viktor Vranckx	1–3	
QEV Technologies	(Sweden) Team E	ZEROID X1	14	(Sweden) Nils Andersson	All	
QEV Technologies	(Sweden) Team E	ZEROID X1	19	(Sweden) Mikaela Åhlin-Kottulinsky	All	
QEV Technologies	(Sweden) Hansen World RX Team	ZEROID X1	21	(Sweden) Timmy Hansen	4	
QEV Technologies	(Sweden) Hansen World RX Team	ZEROID X1	71	(Sweden) Kevin Hansen	4	
QEV Technologies	(Latvia) Ugis Vitols	ZEROID X1	26	(Latvia) Roberts Vitols	3	
QEV Technologies	(Finland) Set Promotion	ZEROID X1	27	(Estonia) Marko Muru	2, 4	
QEV Technologies	(Finland) Set Promotion	ZEROID X1	87	(Finland) Tommi Hallman	3, 5	
QEV Technologies	(Spain) Acciona | Sainz XE Team	ZEROID X1	44	(Spain) Laia Sanz	1	
QEV Technologies	(Norway) Ole Henry Steinsholt	ZEROID X1	88	(Norway) Ole Henry Steinsholt	All	

=== RX3 ===
Constructor	Team	Car	No.	Driver	Rounds	Ref
Audi	(Poland) Volland Racing	Audi A1	6	(Poland) Damian Litwinowicz	All	
Audi	(Poland) Volland Racing	Audi A1	8	(Norway) Espen Isaksætre	All	
Audi	(Poland) Volland Racing	Audi A1	30	(Germany) Nils Volland	All	
Audi	(Poland) Volland Racing	Audi A1	99	(Portugal) João Ribeiro	1–2, 4–5	
Audi	(Hungary) Speedy Motorsport	Audi A1	18	(Hungary) Zsolt Szíjj Jolly	All	
Audi	(Portugal) Andre Sousa	Audi A1	104	(Portugal) Andre Sousa	2	
Audi	(Portugal) Joaquim Machado	Audi A1	146	(Portugal) Joaquim Machado	2	
Citroën	(Portugal) Jorge Machado	Citroën C2	103	(Portugal) Jorge Machado	2	
Ford	(Portugal) Rogerio Sousa	Ford Fiesta	105	(Portugal) Rogerio Sousa	2	
Peugeot	(Portugal) Tiago Ferreira	Peugeot 208	121	(Portugal) Tiago Ferreira	2	
Peugeot	(Portugal) António Sousa	Peugeot 208	129	(Portugal) António Sousa	2	
Renault	(France) Team RX Evolution	Renault Clio	9	(France) Dylan Dufas	5	
Renault	(France) Team RX Evolution	Renault Clio	14	(France) David Bouet	1–2, 4–5	
Renault	(Estonia) RS Racing Team	Renault Twingo	20	(Estonia) Siim Saluri	3–5	
Renault	(Portugal) Sergio Dias	Renault Twingo	149	(Portugal) Sergio Dias	2	
Škoda	(Czech Republic) Pajr S.R.O.	Škoda Citigo	11	(Czech Republic) Jan Černý	1	
Škoda	(Norway) Jens Hvaal	Škoda Fabia	12	(Norway) Jens Hvaal	All	
Škoda	(Lithuania) Motorsport Siauliai	Škoda Fabia	21	(Lithuania) Audrius Kragas	4	
Škoda	(Norway) Martin Kjær	Škoda Fabia	33	(Norway) Martin Kjær	2–5	
Škoda	(Czech Republic) KRTZ Motorsport	Škoda Fabia	58	(Austria) Dominik Senegacnik	All	
Škoda	(Germany) ADAC Team Weser-Ems eV	Škoda Fabia	86	(Germany) Lukas Ney	4–5	
Škoda	(Czech Republic) Jihočeský Autoklub v AČR	Škoda Fabia	96	(Czech Republic) Marcel Suchý	1, 5	
Škoda	(Hungary) Zalaegerszegi ASE	Škoda Fabia	112	(Hungary) Róbert Répási	1	
Škoda	(Portugal) Leonel Sampaio	Škoda Fabia	147	(Portugal) Leonel Sampaio	2	
Suzuki	(Hungary) EAK M-Sport KFT	Suzuki Swift	55	(Hungary) Ferenc Ficza	1	
Volkswagen	(Hungary) Szada Ring Racing KFT	Volkswagen Polo	131	(Hungary) Balázs Körmöczi	All	

== Championship standings ==
Points are scored as follows:

Position	1st	2nd	3rd	4th	5th	6th	7th	8th	9th	10th	11th	12th	13th	14th	15th
Event	20	16	13	12	11	10	9	8	7	6	5	4	3	2	1
Heat ranking	3	2	1												

=== RX1 Driver's Championship ===
Pos.	Driver	HUN (Hungary)	POR (Portugal)	NOR (Norway)	SWE (Sweden)	BLX (Belgium)	GER (Germany)	Points
1	(Sweden) Anton Marklund	2	6^{2}	2^{1}	4^{2}	1^{1}	11^{1}	92
2	(Latvia) Jānis Baumanis	1^{1}	3^{3}	9	5	7	1^{2}	86
3	(United Kingdom) Patrick O'Donovan	3	5	5^{2}	1 (Note: Patrick O'Donovoan was deducted 5 championship points for receiving two reprimands during the season.)	8	2	76
4	(Belgium) Enzo Ide	4^{2}	1^{1}	6^{3}	8	9	3	76
5	(Hungary) Tamás Kárai	11	4	3	11	3	5	59
6	(Germany) René Münnich	7	2	7	12	13	4	53
7	(Norway) Sivert Svardal	17	13	1	6	6^{3}	9	51
8	(Denmark) Ulrik Linnemann	10	12		3	2	13	42
9	(Hungary) Máté Benyó	5^{3}	7	11	14	10	14	36
10	(Norway) Hans-Jøran Østreng	12		12	15	5	7	29
11	(Hungary) Zoltán Koncseg	18	9	8	21	4	15	28
12	(Hungary) Attila Mózer	13	8	14	20	15	8	22
13	(Norway) Andreas Bakkerud	6			7^{3}			20
14	(Sweden) Robin Larsson				2^{1}			19
15	(Germany) Mandie August	16	14	4	16	16	17	14
16	(Czech Republic) Aleš Fučik	9					10	13
17	(Sweden) Peter Hedström						6^{3}	11
18	(Hungary) László Kiss	8						8
19	(Finland) Mikko Ikonen					12	12	8
20	(Sweden) Linus Östlund				9			7
21	(Lithuania) Paulius Pleskovas	19	11		19	14	16	7
22	(Switzerland) Yury Belevskiy					11^{2}		7
23	(France) Anthony Pelfrene		10					6
24	(Norway) Sverre Isachsen			10				6
25	(Sweden) Mats Öhman				10			6
26	(Norway) Frank Valle			13	18			3
27	(Sweden) Anders Michalak				13			3
28	(Hungary) Márk Mózer	14			17			2
29	(Norway) Tom André Sætnan			15	22			1
30	(Portugal) José Oliveira		15					1
31	(Republic of Ireland) Oliver O'Donovan	15						1
32	(United Kingdom) Stephen Hill		16					0
33	(Italy) Werner Gurschler						18	0
34	(France) Nicolas Briand				23			0
35	(France) Pascal Lambec				24			0
Pos.	Driver	HUN (Hungary)	POR (Portugal)	NOR (Norway)	SWE (Sweden)	BLX (Belgium)	GER (Germany)	Points

Colour	Result
Gold	Winner
Silver	Second place
Bronze	Third place
Green	Points classification
Blue	Non-points classification
Blue	Non-classified finish (NC)
Purple	Retired, not classified (Ret)
Red	Did not qualify (DNQ)
Red	Did not pre-qualify (DNPQ)
Black	Disqualified (DSQ)
White	Did not start (DNS)
White	Withdrew (WD)
White	Race cancelled (C)
Blank	Did not practice (DNP)
Blank	Did not arrive (DNA)
Blank	Excluded (EX)

In-line notation
^{1–3}	Top 3 heat ranking

=== RX2e Driver's Championship ===
Pos.	Driver	NOR (Norway)	SWE (Sweden)	GBR (United Kingdom)	BLX (Belgium)	GER (Germany)	Points
1	(Sweden) Nils Andersson	2^{2}	5^{2}	5^{2}	4	2^{3}	76
2	(Sweden) Isak Sjökvist	1^{1}	3	9	8	3^{2}	69
3	(Sweden) Mikaela Åhlin-Kottulinsky	3	4	7	2^{3}	9	66
4	(Spain) Pablo Suárez	4	8	4	11	7	52
5	(Norway) Ole Henry Steinsholt	10 (Note: Ole Henry Steinsholt was deducted 5 championship points for conducting private testing at an RX2e venue less than 56 days ahead of the event. He was deducted a further 5 championship points for receiving two reprimands during the season.)	1^{3}	3	5	10	50
6	(Sweden) Filip Thorén	6	6	8	10	6	50
7	(Finland) Tommi Hallman			1^{1}		1^{1}	46
8	(Belgium) Viktor Vranckx	9^{3}	2^{1}	2^{3}			44
9	(Estonia) Marko Muru		7		3		26
10	(United Kingdom) Catie Munnings	7	9	10			22
11	(Australia) Molly Taylor				12	8	18
12	(Spain) Cristina Gutiérrez	5	10				17
13	(Latvia) Roberts Vitols			6			10
14	(Spain) Laia Sanz	8					8
15	(China) Yan Zhang					11	7
Guest entries ineligible for points
	(Sweden) Johan Kristoffersson				1^{1}		-
	(Finland) Niclas Grönholm					4	-
	(Sweden) Klara Andersson					5	-
	(Sweden) Timmy Hansen				6		-
	(Sweden) Kevin Hansen				7^{2}		-
	(Norway) Ole Christian Veiby				9		-
Pos.	Driver	NOR (Norway)	SWE (Sweden)	GBR (United Kingdom)	BLX (Belgium)	GER (Germany)	Points

=== RX3 Driver's Championship ===
Pos.	Driver	HUN (Hungary)	POR (Portugal)	NOR (Norway)	SWE (Sweden)	GER (Germany)	Points
1	(Poland) Damian Litwinowicz	1^{2}	1^{1}	2^{3}	2	4^{3}	91
2	(Norway) Espen Isaksætre	2^{1}	2	3^{2}	1^{1}	5^{1}	87
3	(Germany) Nils Volland	9	3^{3}	1^{1}	5^{2}	3 (Note: Nils Volland was deducted 5 championship points for receiving two reprimands during the season.)	65
4	(Norway) Jens Hvaal	4	7	4	3	DSQ	46
5	(Norway) Martin Kjær		4	6	6	6	43
6	(Portugal) João Ribeiro	12	5^{2}		4^{3}	8^{2}	39
7	(Hungary) Balázs Körmöczi	3	15	7	9	12	34
8	(Austria) Dominik Senegacnik	8	9	9 (Note: Dominic Senegacnik was deducted 5 championship points for receiving two reprimands during the season.)	11	9	30
9	(Hungary) Zsolt Szíjj Jolly	7	16	8	8		25
10	(Estonia) Siim Saluri			6	12	7	23
11	(France) David Bouet	11	17			2	21
12	(France) Dylan Dufas					1	20
13	(Czech Republic) Jan Černý	5^{3}					12
14	(Germany) Lukas Ney				10	10	12
15	(Czech Republic) Marcel Suchý	10				11	11
16	(Portugal) Jorge Machado		6				10
17	(Hungary) Ferenc Ficza	6					10
18	(Lithuania) Audrius Kragas				7		9
19	(Portugal) Joaquim Machado		8				8
20	(Portugal) Rogerio Sousa		10				6
21	(Portugal) Leonel Sampaio		11				5
22	(Portugal) Tiago Ferreira		12				4
23	(Hungary) Róbert Répási	13					3
24	(Portugal) Andre Sousa		13				3
25	(Portugal) Sergio Dias		14				2
26	(Portugal) António Sousa		18				0
Pos.	Driver	HUN (Hungary)	POR (Portugal)	NOR (Norway)	SWE (Sweden)	GER (Germany)	Points
