= Németbánya =

Németbánya Deutschhütten
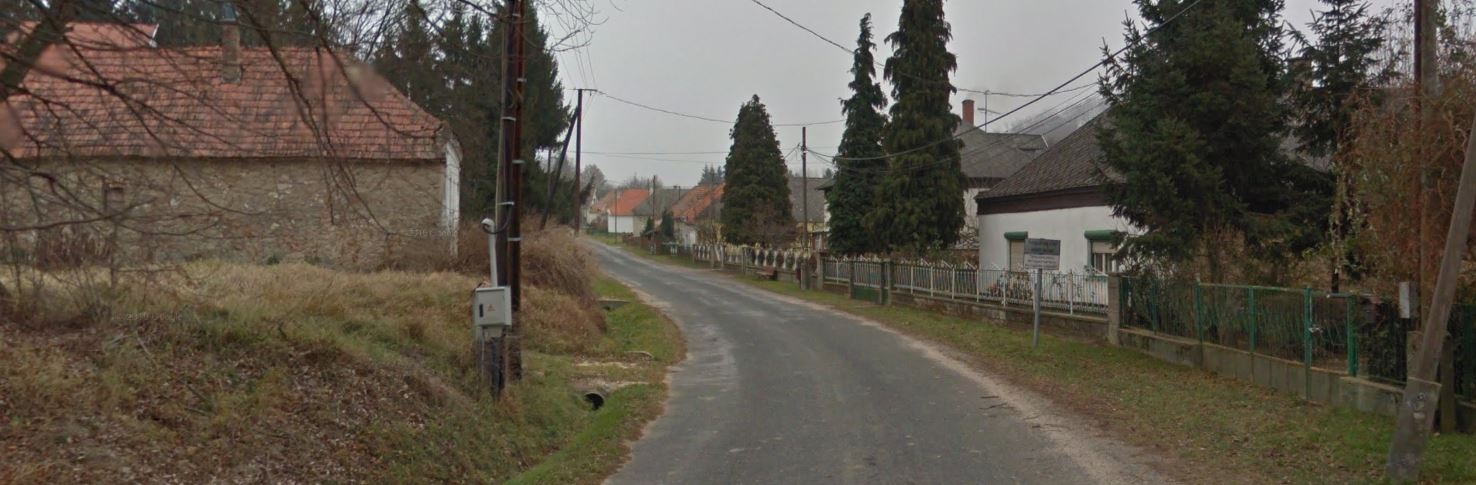

- Location of Veszprém county in Hungary

- Location of Németbánya
- Coordinates: 47.21646°N 17.64439°E
- Country: Hungary
- County: Veszprém

Area
  - Total: 12.19 km^{2} (4.71 sq mi)

Population (2004)
  - Total: 89
  - Density: 7.3/km^{2} (19/sq mi)
- Time zone: UTC+1 (CET)
  - Summer (DST): UTC+2 (CEST)
- Postal code: 8581
- Area code: 89

Németbánya (formerly Németh-Bánya; German: Deutschhütten or Deutsch-Hütten; lit. 'German mine') is a village in Veszprém county, Hungary.

== Nearby municipalities ==
- Csehbánya ("Bohemian mine")
- Farkasgyepű
