= Gábor Ferenczi =

Hungarian politician (born 1977)

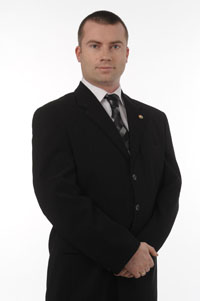
- Gábor Ferenczi in 2010

Member of the National Assembly
- In office 14 May 2010 – 5 May 2014

Personal details
- Born: 28 May 1977 (age 48) Ajka, Hungary
- Party: Jobbik (2008–2018); Our Homeland (2018–2019)
- Profession: educator, politician

Gábor Ferenczi (born 28 May 1977) is a Hungarian educator and politician, who has been the mayor of Devecser since 2014. Prior to that, he was a member of the National Assembly (MP) from 2010 to 2014. He was a politician of the far-right Jobbik, then Our Homeland Movement.

== Career ==
Gábor Ferenczi was born in Ajka on 28 May 1977. He graduated as a Hungarian-German teacher in 1999 and as a cultural organizer in the Teacher Training College Faculty of the Eötvös Loránd University (ELTE).

He joined the paramilitary Magyar Gárda in the spring of 2008. He was a founding member and president of the local branch of the Jobbik in Ajka since 2008. He was elected president of the party's branch in Veszprém County in December 2008. He functioned as a vice-president of the party's electoral board since September 2009.

Ferenczi was elected a Member of Parliament via the Veszprém County regional list of the Jobbik in the 2010 parliamentary election. He was involved in the Committee on Education, Science and Research from 2010 to 2014. He was also a member of that ad-hoc parliamentary committee, which investigated the alumina plant accident in his birthplace Ajka, between December 2010 and March 2012. Ferenczi ran for an individual seat for Pápa (Veszprém County 4th constituency) in the 2014 parliamentary election, but came to the second place after Fidesz candidate Zoltán Kovács and Ferenczi lost his parliamentary seat.

Ferenczi was elected mayor of Devecser during the 2014 local elections. Simultaneously, he also became a member of the Veszprém County Assembly, serving in this capacity until 2019. He was re-elected as mayor in 2017 (by-election) and 2019. After the 2018 parliamentary election, Ferenczi participated in the foundation of the internal opposition Ourselves political platform within the Jobbik. He left the Jobbik on 8 June 2018 and became a founding member and vice-president of the Our Homeland Movement. Ferenczi left the Our Homeland in June 2019.

== Traffic accident ==
In May 2013, Ferenczi was driving in Ajka when he hit an elderly woman who died while being transported to the hospital. He was charged with negligence causing a fatal road accident. Ferenczi waived his immunity, but appealed against the suspicion, which was rejected by the Prosecutor General's Office. According to Ferenczi, the accident could not have been avoided. On 30 September 2015, the District Court of Ajka sentenced him to one year of probation, suspended for two years, and banned him from driving for three years. In his reasoning, the judge said the delay in perceiving and acting was to blame for the accused, but the intent was not. The Court of Veszprém upheld the judgment at first instance.
