= Veszprém County Assembly =

Local legislative body in Hungary

Veszprém County Assembly Veszprém Megyei Közgyűlés

Type
- Type: County Council

History
- Founded: 1990

Leadership
- President: Imre Polgárdy, Fidesz–KDNP since 12 October 2014
- Vice-president: Éva Vörösmarty

Structure
- Seats: 17 councillors
- Political groups: Administration: Fidesz–KDNP (10); Other parties (7): Jobbik (2); DK (2); MSZP (1); Momentum (1); Our Homeland (1)
- Length of term: five years

Elections
- Last election: 13 October 2019
- Next election: 2024

Meeting place
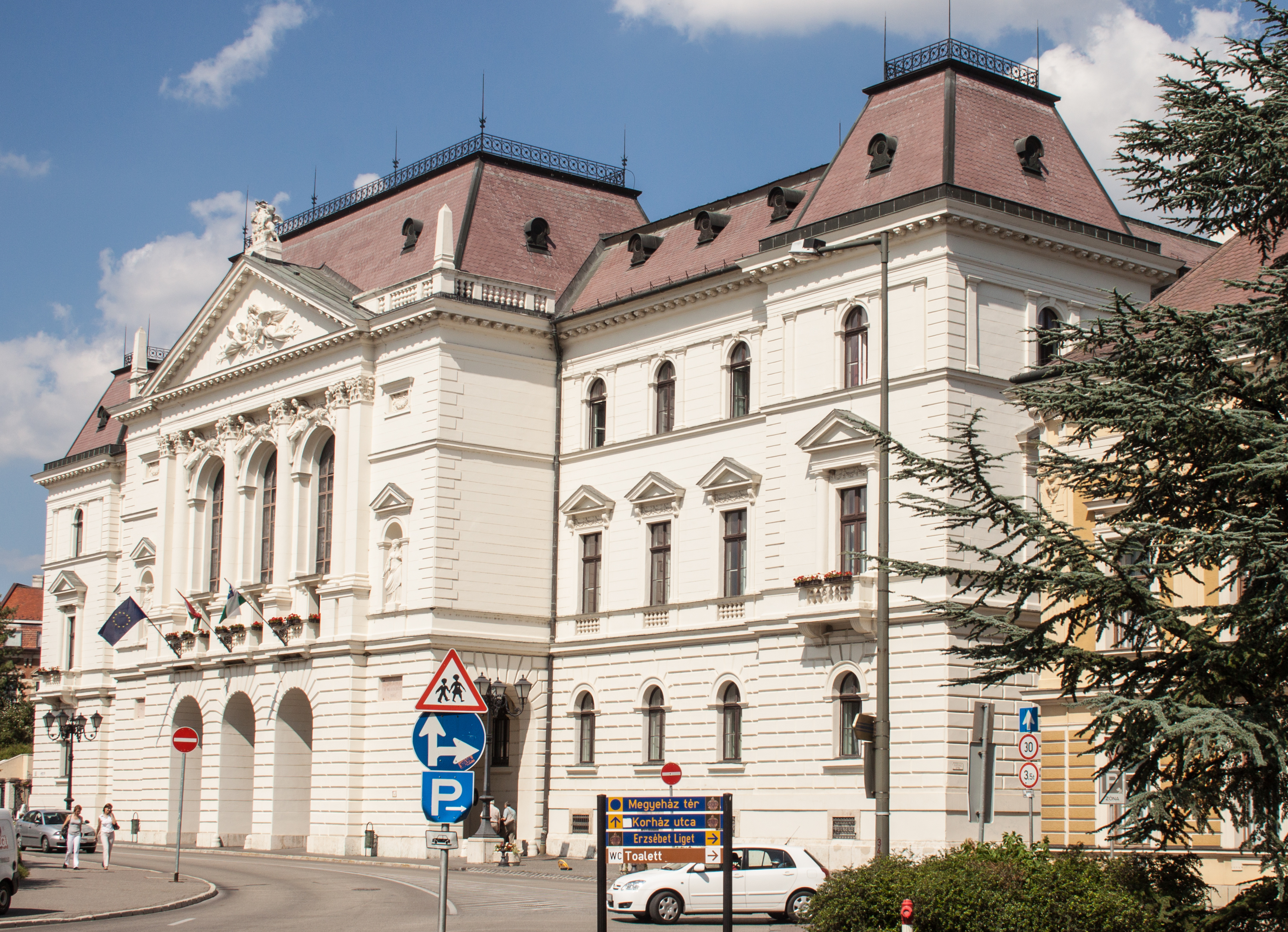
- County Hall, Veszprém

Website
- vpmegye.hu

The Veszprém County Assembly (Hungarian: Veszprém Megyei Közgyűlés) is the local legislative body of Veszprém County in the Central Transdanubia, in Hungary.

== Composition ==
Deputies in Veszprém County Assembly
Key to parties Hungarian Socialist Party (MSZP): MSZP-SZDSZ alliance (2002, 2006); Democratic Coalition (DK) Alliance of Free Democrats (SZDSZ) Momentum Movement (Momentum) Jobbik Fidesz (Fidesz–KDNP): Fidesz-MDF-MKDSZ-MDNP alliance (1998); Fidesz-MKDSZ-KPE alliance (2002); Fidesz-KDNP alliance (from 2006); Christian Democratic People's Party (KDNP): KDNP-Conservative-MDF-MOSZ-NDSZ alliance (1994); Hungarian Democratic Forum (MDF) Independent Smallholders, Agrarian Workers and Civic Party (FKgP) Hungarian Justice and Life Party (MIÉP) Our Homeland Movement (Mi Hazánk) Balaton Association (Balatoni Szövettség)
Period	Distribution	Seats
1994–1998	13 / 6 / 6 / 6 / 8 / 1	40
1998–2002	12 / 3 / 18 / 4 / 1 / 2	40
2002–2006	20 / 17 / 3	40
2006–2010	15 / 23 / 2	40
2010–2014	4 / 12 / 2	18
2014–2019	3 / 1 / 10 / 3	17
2019–2024	1 / 2 / 1 / 2 / 10 / 1	17

=== 2019 ===
The Assembly elected at the 2019 local government elections, is made up of 17 counselors, with the following party composition:

Summary of the 13 October 2019 election results
Party	Votes	%	+/-	Seats	+/-	Seats %
Fidesz–KDNP	62,209	54.01	▼4.81	10	0	73.34
Jobbik	14,030	12.18	▼8.23	2	▼1	11.76
Democratic Coalition (DK)	11,654	10.12	▲4.24	2	▲1	11.76
Hungarian Socialist Party (MSZP)	10,753	9.34	▼7.07	1	▼2	5.88
Momentum Movement (Momentum)	10,614	9.22		1	▲1	5.88
Our Homeland Movement (Mi Hazánk)	5,911	5.13		1	▲1	5.88
Total	119,029	100.0		17	0	
Voter turnout		49.24	▲4.67			

After the elections in 2019 the Assembly controlled by the Fidesz–KDNP party alliance which has 10 councillors, versus 2 Jobbik, 2 Democratic Coalition (DK), 1 Hungarian Socialist Party (MSZP), 1 Momentum Movement, and 1 Our Homeland Movement (Mi Hazánk) councillors.

List of seat winners

On the Fidesz–Christian Democratic People's Party list:
1. Imre Polgárdy (president)
2. Éva Vörösmarty (vice-president)
3. Tamás Áldozó
4. Ferenc Tábori
5. Ernő Horváth
6. Alexandra Nagyné Bátor
7. Norbert Benjamin Ihász
8. Tamás Papp
9. Virág Bőrné Kiss
10. Tibor Ravasz

On the Jobbik list:

1. István Galambos
2. Zoltán Dobó

On the Democratic Coalition list:

1. Istvánné Deák
2. János Szöllősi

On the Hungarian Socialist Party list:

1. Attila Grőber

On the Momentum Movement list:

1. Szilveszter Benedek

On the Our Homeland Movement list:

1. István Eszli

=== 2014 ===
The Assembly elected at the 2014 local government elections, is made up of 17 counselors, with the following party composition:

Summary of the 12 October 2014 election results
Party	Votes	%	+/-	Seats	+/-	Seats %
Fidesz–KDNP	56,679	53.00	▼9.58	10	▼2	58.82
Jobbik	21,832	20.41	▲7.03	3	▲1	17.65
Hungarian Socialist Party (MSZP)	18,623	17.41	▼6.63	3	▼1	17.65
Democratic Coalition (DK)	5,878	5.50		1	▲1	5.88
Together (Együtt)	3,934	3.68		0	±0	0
Total	110,628	100.0		17	▼1	
Voter turnout		44.57	▼3.67			

After the elections in 2014 the Assembly controlled by the Fidesz–KDNP party alliance which has 10 councillors, versus 3 Jobbik, 3 Hungarian Socialist Party (MSZP) and 1 Democratic Coalition (DK) councillors.

List of seat winners

On the Fidesz–Christian Democratic People's Party list:
1. Imre Polgárdy (president)
2. Tamás Áldozó
3. Éva Vörösmarty (vice-president, from 2018)
4. László Császár
5. Ferenc Tábori
6. István Pálffy
7. Szilvia Galambos
8. Tamás Papp
9. Zoltán Fenyvesi (vice-president, until 2018)
10. Beatrix Zsuzsanna Kovács

On the Jobbik list:

1. Gábor Ferenczi
2. Zoltán Dobó
3. Imre Orbán

On the Hungarian Socialist Party list:

1. Zoltán Gőgös
2. Béla Pál
3. József Horváth

On the Democratic Coalition list:

1. Istvánné Deák

=== 2010 ===
The Assembly elected at the 2010 local government elections, is made up of 18 counselors, with the following party composition:

Summary of the 3 October 2010 election results
Party	Votes	%	+/-	Seats	+/-	Seats %
Fidesz–KDNP	73,315	62.58	▲.	12	▼11	66.67
Hungarian Socialist Party (MSZP)	28,163	24.04	▼.	4	▼11	22.22
Jobbik	15,670	13.38		2	▲2	11.11
Total	121,178	100.0		18	▼22	
Voter turnout		48.24				

After the elections in 2010 the Assembly controlled by the Fidesz–KDNP party alliance which has 12 councillors, versus 4 Hungarian Socialist Party (MSZP) and 2 Jobbik councillors.

List of seat winners

On the Fidesz–Christian Democratic People's Party list:
1. Jenő Lasztovicza (president)
2. Imre Polgárdy (vice-president, socially vice)
3. Tamás Áldozó
4. Éva Vörösmarty
5. Miklós Kropf
6. Zsolt Horváth
7. Norbert Kovács (vice-president, full-time)
8. László Végh
9. Tamás Papp
10. Mihály Stolár
11. Szilvia Galambos
12. Lenke Hári

On the Hungarian Socialist Party list:

1. István Pusztai
2. Jenő Nagy
3. Lévai József
4. József Horváth

On the Jobbik list:

1. Imre Orbán
2. Zoltán Dobó

== Presidents of the Assembly ==
So far, the presidents of the Veszrpém County Assembly have been:

- 1990–1998 Gábor Zongor
- 1998–2002 Csaba Kuti, Fidesz–MDF-MKDSZ-MDNP, and Independent after 2002
- 2006–2014 Jenő Lasztovicza, Fidesz–KDNP
- since 2014 Imre Polgárdy, Fidesz–KDNP
