= Péter Balatincz =

Hungarian politician

Member of the National Assembly
- Incumbent
- Assumed office 9 May 2026
- Preceded by: Tibor Navracsics
- Constituency: Veszprém 3rd

Personal details
- Party: Tisza

Péter Balatincz is a Hungarian politician who was elected member of the National Assembly in 2026 representing the Veszprém County 3rd constituency. He previously worked as a physician.
