= Mihály Barla =

Hungarian writer (c. 1778–1824)

Mihály Barla Slovene Miháo Barla (circa 1778 – February 4, 1824) was a Slovenian Lutheran pastor, writer, and poet.

He was born in Murska Sobota. He studied in Sopron, in the Evangelical Lyceum, by 1803 studied in the University of Jena.
In 1807 was the director of the Hungarian-Latin School of Sárszentlőrinc (Tolna), in 1808 teacher of Evangelical School of Győr. 1810-1824 ministrat in Kővágóörs, near the Balaton, and here died.

In 1823 rework the hymn-book of Mihály Bakos on the score of Krszcsánszke nóve peszmene knige (New Christian hymn-book, Hung. Új keresztény énekeskönyv).

== Other works ==
- Köszöntő versek (Sopron, 1901)
- Ditomszke, versuske i molitvene knizicze (Sopron, 1820)
- Az isteni kötél emberek kezében (Győr, ?)

== See also ==
- List of Slovene writers and poets in Hungary
- Mihály Bakos
- Kővágóörs
