= Veszprém County Hall =

- Veszprém Megyeháza
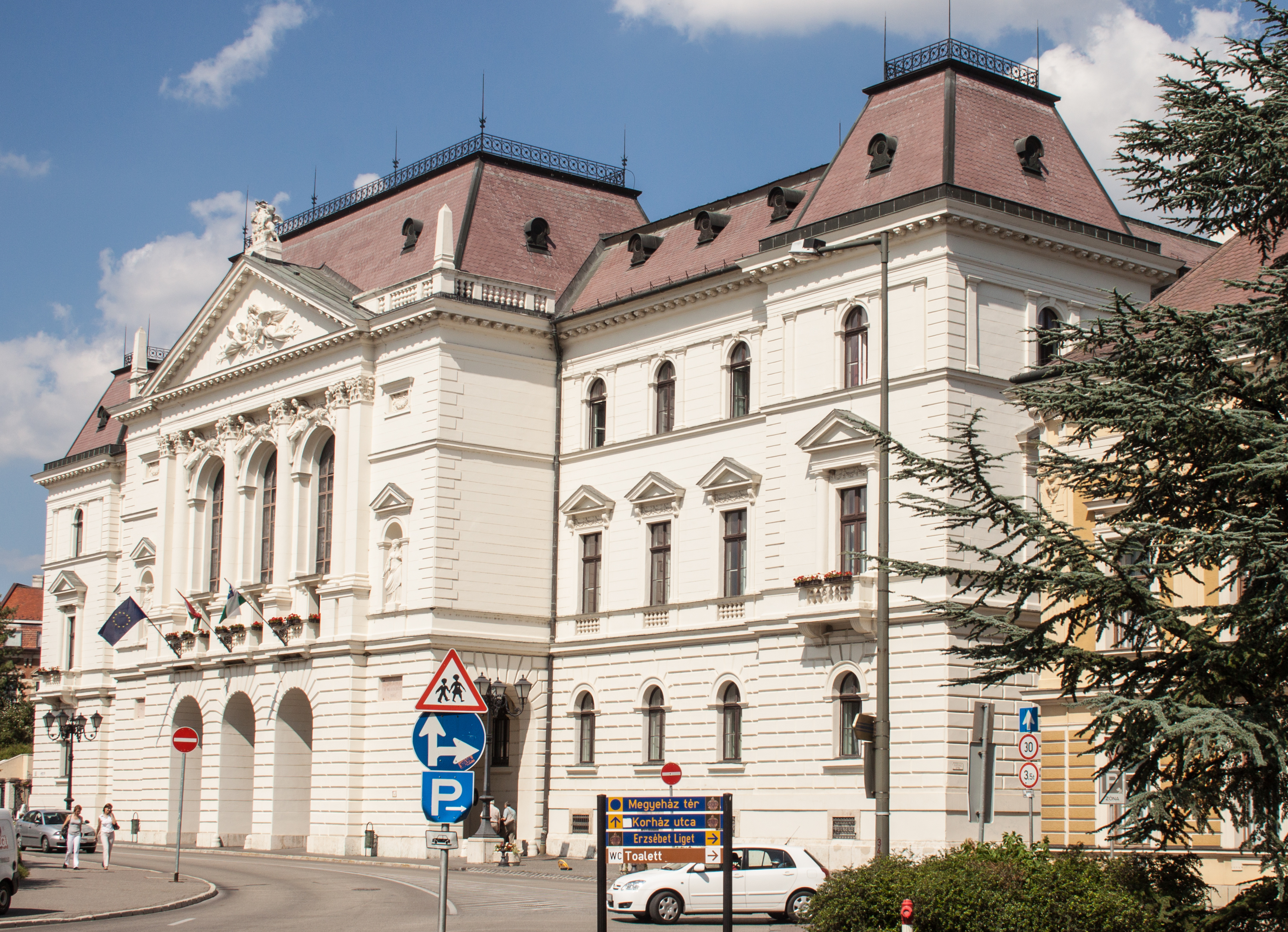
- Interactive map of the Veszprém County Hall area

General information
- Architectural style: Neo-renaissance
- Location: Veszprém, Hungary
- Coordinates: 47°05′30″N 17°54′30″E
- Current tenants: Veszprém County Assembly
- Construction started: 1885-1887

The Veszprém County Hall (Hungarian: Veszprém Megyeháza) is a representative historical building in Veszprém, Hungary. Designed by Budapest-based architect István Kiss, who won a competition in 1884, the building have a distinct angular layout enclosing a courtyard, a grand entrance, and an arched coach gate. The building houses the Veszprém County Assembly.

== History ==
Until the 18th century, Veszprém County did not have a dedicated administrative building. This was largely due to the fact that from the early 14th century to the late 18th century, the Bishop of Veszprém held the office of Lord Lieutenant (főispán). As a result, county assemblies were held at the Bishop's Palace. During the Ottoman occupation, these meetings were often convened in other, safer parts of western Hungary, including Pápa and Körmend.

After the end of the Ottoman era, county assemblies were increasingly held in Veszprém itself, leading to a growing need for a permanent County Hall. In response to this, Bishop Márton Padányi Biró provided a plot of land within the outer castle, and between 1754 and 1763, the first county hall was built, likely designed by the renowned local mason József Tietharth. However, this initial structure was small and insufficient for the county's needs. Additionally, it was damaged in the 1810 earthquake, making it necessary to construct a new building.

The county assembly decided at its meeting on September 5, 1883, to build a completely new county hall. Following this decision, the county's legislative authority announced a public design competition on May 30, 1884. The building was built at the site of the former salt house of Veszprém.

The building was built between 1885 and 1887 based on the designs of Budapest architect István Kiss. The second floor was originally designated for the county archives, but due to the weight of the accumulated documents, it was relocated to the ground floor in 1903. At that time, the Veszprém County Museum collection was moved to the second floor, where it remained until 1925. In December 1944, part of the building was converted into a German barracks. The archives functioned in the building until 1979. For its centennial, the County Hall underwent a complete renovation, which began in the early 1980s. During the reconstruction, six conference rooms were created, decorated with terracotta reliefs depicting local architectural heritage and historical landmarks. In the early 1990s, these rooms were given distinctive names.

== See also ==
- University of Pannonia
