= Révfülöp =

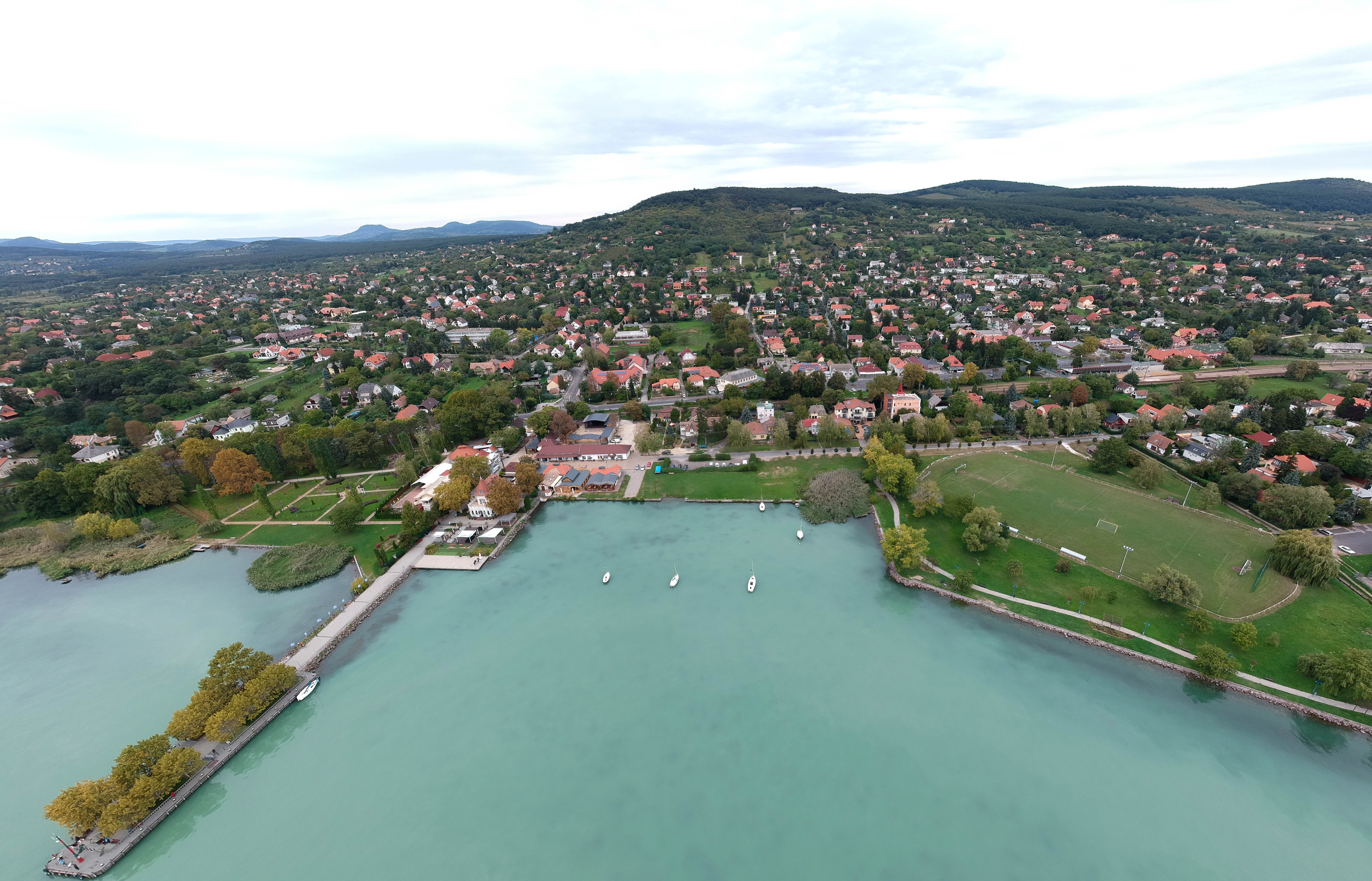
- Révfülöp

- Flag Coat of arms

- Location of Révfülöp in Hungary
- Coordinates: 46.8326°N 17.6277°E
- Country: Hungary
- Region: Central Transdanubia
- County: Veszprém

Area
  - Total: 10.36 km^{2} (4.00 sq mi)

Population (2024)
  - Total: 1,242
  - Density: 119.9/km^{2} (310.5/sq mi)
- Time zone: UTC+1 (CET)
  - Summer (DST): UTC+2 (CEST)
- Postal code: 8253
- Area code: +36 87
- Website: http://www.revfulop.hu

Révfülöp is a village in Veszprém county, Hungary, located on the northern shore of the Balaton. Révfülöp is well known as the starting point for an annual long-distance swimming race across the Balaton to Balatonboglár.

== Etymology ==
Fülöp comes from the Hungarian version of the personal name Phillip; this was the original name of the town. Later, the word rév, which means ferry crossing, was added as a prefix.

== History ==
Révfülöp has existed since Medieval times, when it developed as a rév, or ferry crossing point, due to the proximity to the southern shore. The settlement is first mentioned in 1211. Around 1538, it was destroyed during the Turkish invasion. Subsequently, it became a viticultural colony of the nearby town Kővágóörs, and then a vassal land of the Tihany Abbey. However, by the early 18th century, private owners began buying property in the area once more. In 1752, the harbor reopened, and during the 19th century, the town expanded due to the construction projects of many wealthy vacationers, under whose alliance in the Révfülöp Beach and Shore Development Committee the town gained independence in 1943. Since this time, Révfülöp has been characterized by dynamic growth.

Further increases in boat and train traffic — Révfülöp sports a large railway station — have made the town a local commercial and professional center, with numerous specialty stores, restaurants, and hotels opening over the course of the 20th century as the number of vacationers increased. It was also during this time that the town was connected to the national telephone and electrical infrastructure. Today, viticulture and the tourist-service sector are the two primary sources of employment. In 2001, the Millennium Lookout Tower was constructed on the mountain north of the town. The main historical attraction remains the old downtown and port, both featuring eclectic architecture evocative of the turn of the 20th century.

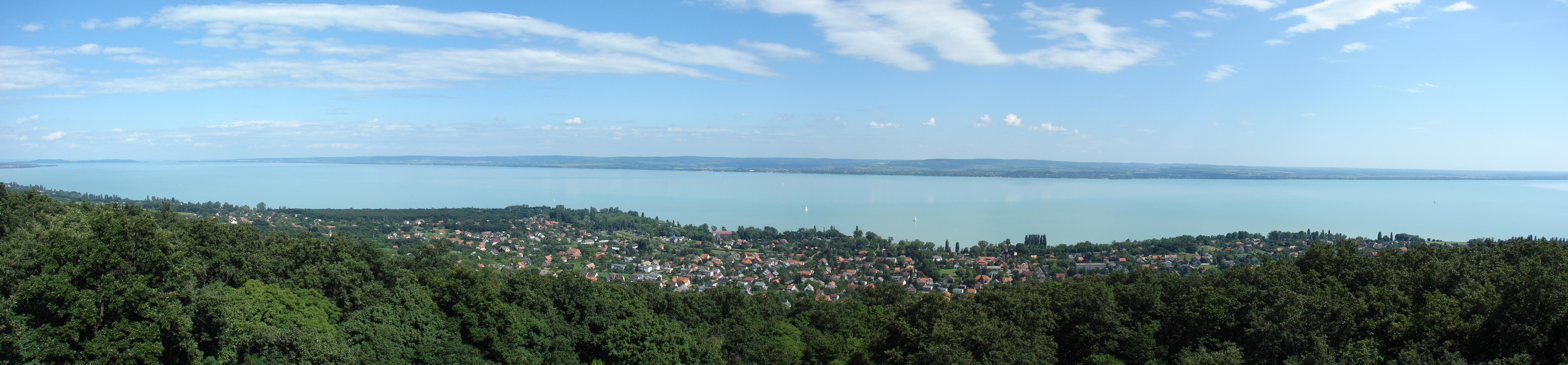
A panorama of Révfülöp made from the Millennium Lookout Tower.
