= Csehbánya =

Csehbánya _{Böhmischhütten/Böhmisch-Hütten}
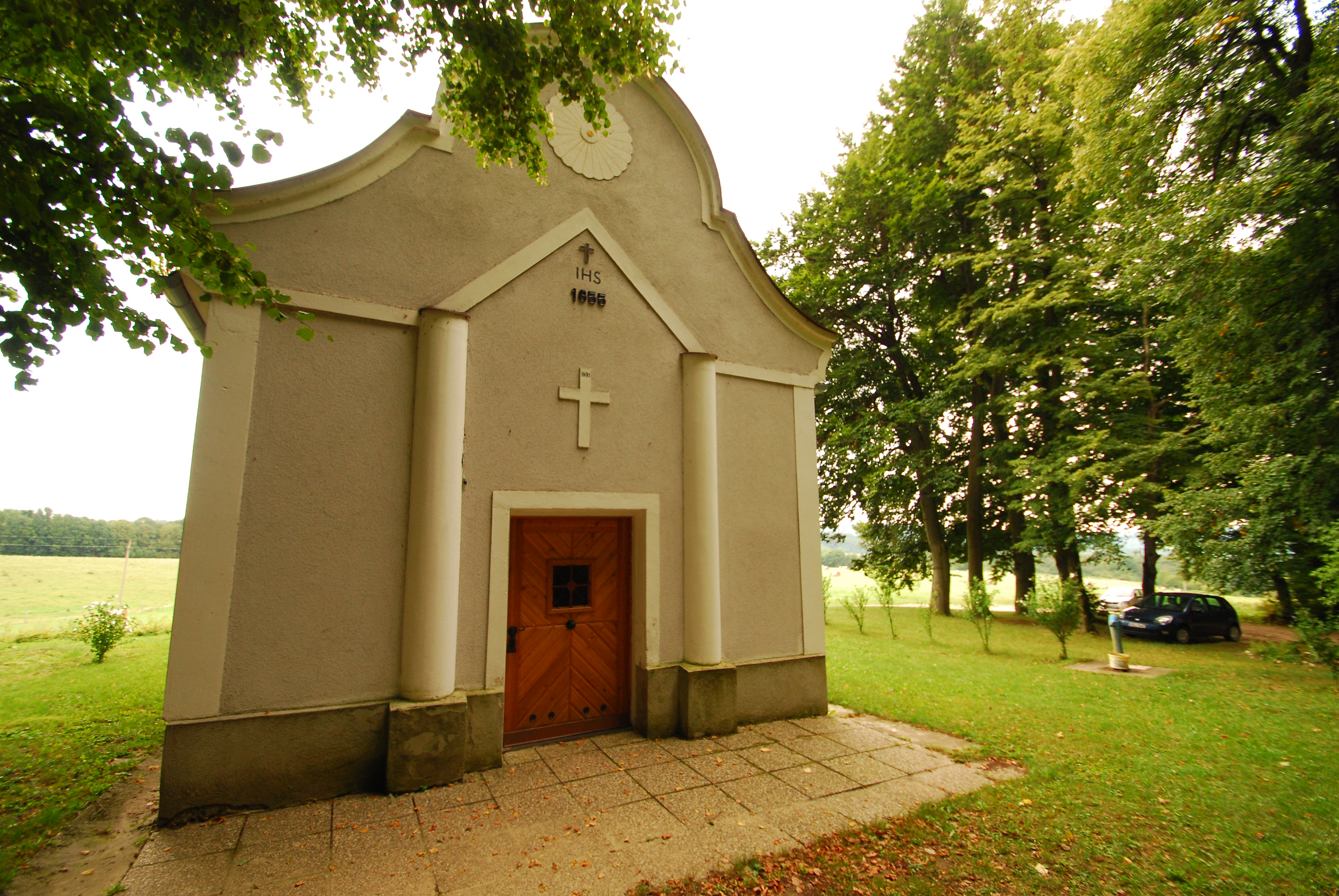
- Chapel in Csehbánya

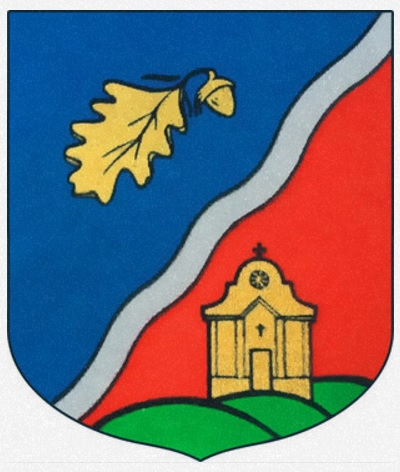
- Coat of arms

- Location of Csehbánya
- Coordinates: 47.17718°N 17.68553°E
- Country: Hungary
- County: Veszprém

Area
  - Total: 12.83 km^{2} (4.95 sq mi)

Population (2004)
  - Total: 283
  - Density: 22.05/km^{2} (57.1/sq mi)
- Time zone: UTC+1 (CET)
  - Summer (DST): UTC+2 (CEST)
- Postal code: 8445
- Area code: 88

Csehbánya (Böhmischhütten, Böhmisch-Hütten, "Cseh-Bánya means "Czech mine"") is a village in Veszprém county, Hungary.

== Nearby municipalities ==
- Németbánya
- Farkasgyepű
- Döbrönte
- Herend
