= Nyirád Racing Center =

Motorsport race track in Hungary

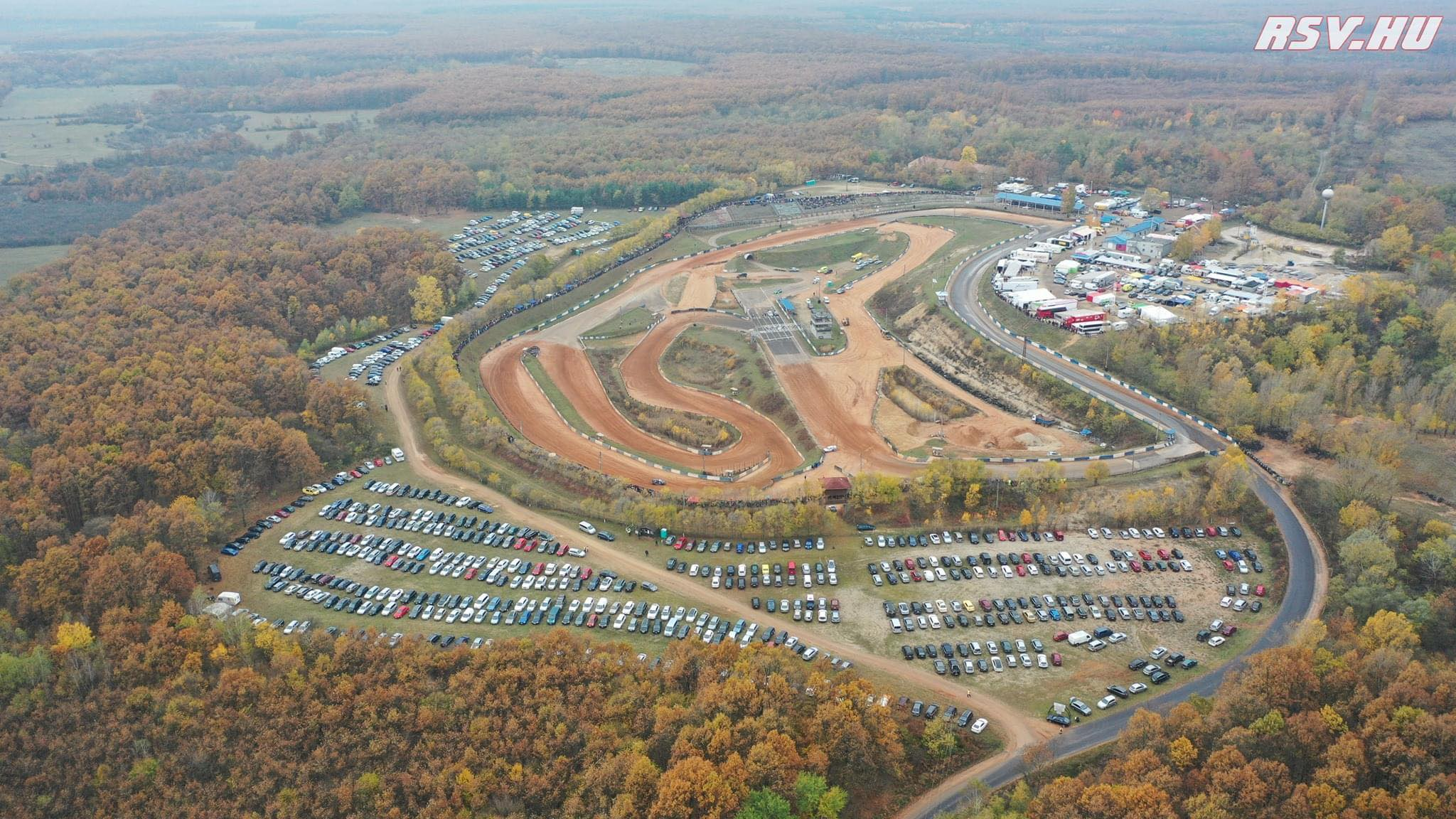
- Aerial view of Nyirád Racing Center
- Location: Nyirád, Hungary
- Coordinates: 46°58′12″N 17°25′18″E
- FIA Grade: 6R (Rallycross); 6A (Autocross)
- Opened: 2006
- Major events: Current: FIA European Rallycross Championship; Euro RX of Hungary (2006–2013, 2022–present); Former: FIA World Rallycross Championship; World RX of Hungary (2024–2025)

Rallycross Circuit (2006–present)
- Length: 1.290 km (0.802 mi)

Autocross Circuit (2006–present)
- Length: 1.040 km (0.646 mi)

Nyirád Racing Center is a motorsport race track situated in the village of Nyirád, in Veszprém County, Hungary. It is one of the most traditional tracks in Central Europe and has hosted events in the FIA World Rallycross Championship, FIA European Rallycross Championship and European Autocross Championship, as well national championship races and amateur competitions.

== History ==
The Nyirád Racing Center was already an important stop in the first Hungarian Rallycross Championship, as it is one of the first tracks in the country. The Hungarian round of the FIA European Rallycross Championship was held in Hungary for the first time on this track in 2006, remaining on the calendar until 2013. In 2022, it became the Hungarian round of the Euro RX again, serving as the opening round of the championship. It returned for the 2023 season, again as its opening round. On 28 February 2024, the Nyirád Racing Center was announced as hosting the Euro RX of Hungary and World RX of Hungary in the same weekend, on 27–28 July.
