= Zalaszentjakab =

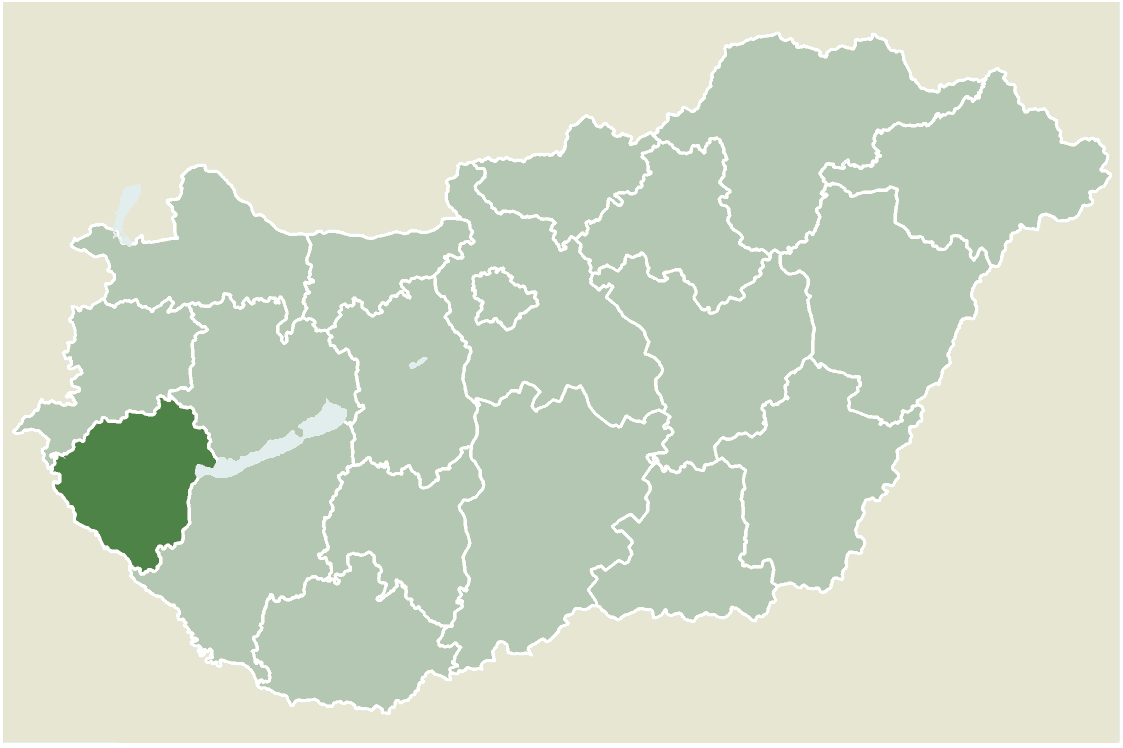
- Location of Zala county in Hungary

- Location of Zalaszentjakab
- Coordinates: 46.48586°N 17.1269°E
- Country: Hungary
- County: Zala

Area
  - Total: 7.01 km^{2} (2.71 sq mi)

Population (2004)
  - Total: 390
  - Density: 55.63/km^{2} (144.1/sq mi)
- Time zone: UTC+1 (CET)
  - Summer (DST): UTC+2 (CEST)
- Postal code: 8827
- Area code: 93
- Motorways: M7
- Distance from Budapest: 200 km (120 mi) Northeast

Zalaszentjakab is a village in Zala County, Hungary.
