= Zalaszentmihály =

Coordinates: 46°43′N 16°57′E

- Village
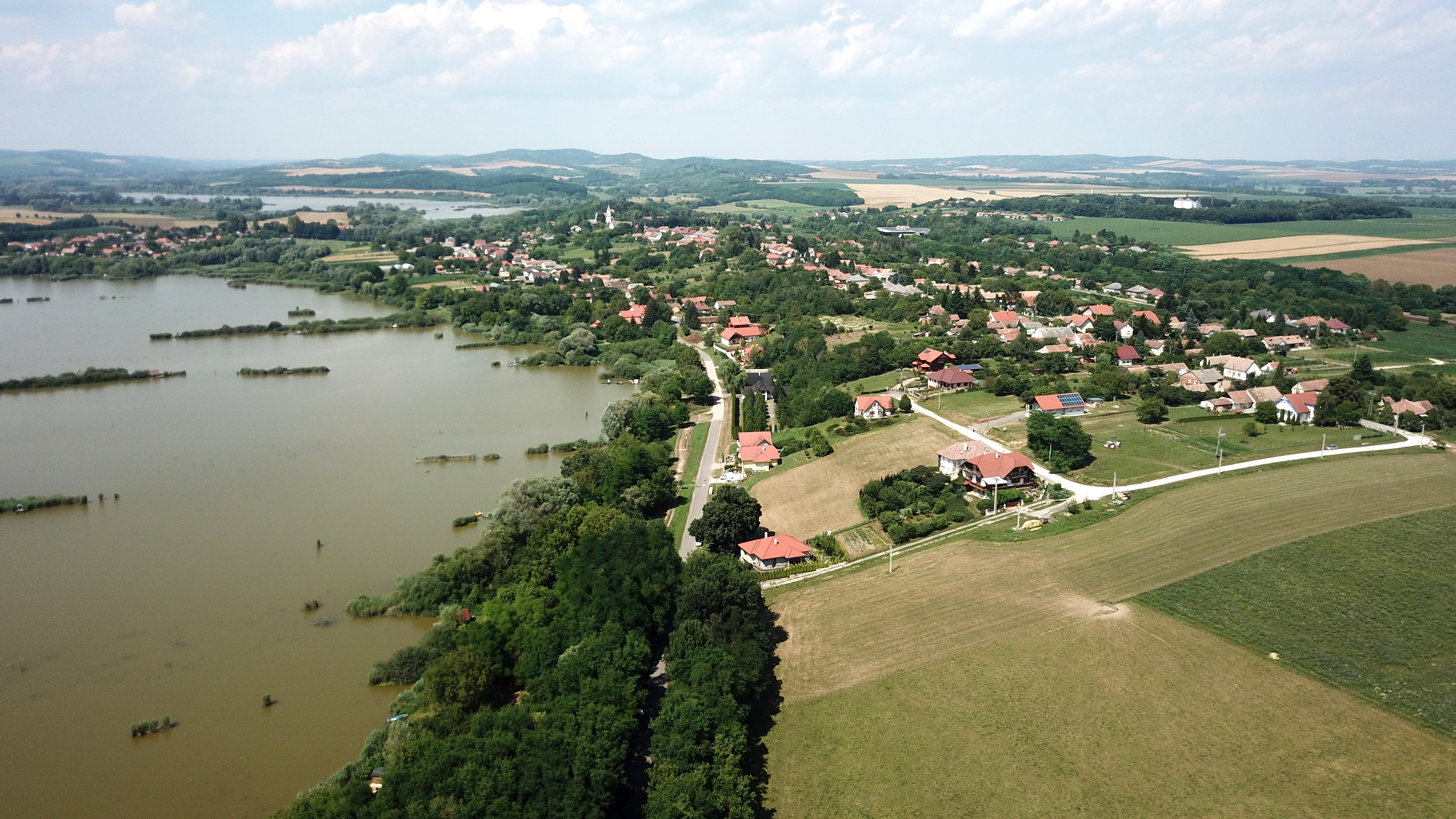
- Zalaszentmihaly
- Interactive map of Zalaszentmihály
- Country: Hungary
- Region: Western Transdanubia
- County: Zala County
- Time zone: UTC+1 (CET)
  - Summer (DST): UTC+2 (CEST)

Zalaszentmihály is a village in Zala County, Hungary.
