= Zalaigrice =

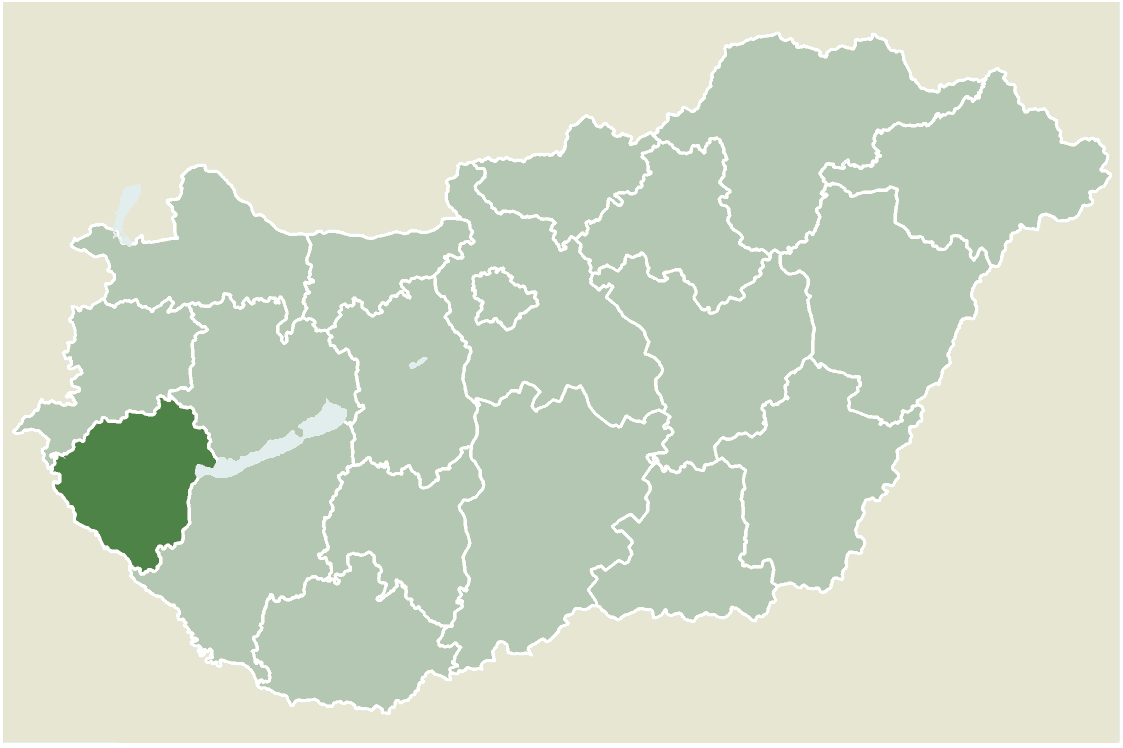
- Location of Zala county in Hungary

- Location of Zalaigrice
- Coordinates: 46.74693°N 17.00969°E
- Country: Hungary
- County: Zala

Government
  - Mayor: Horváth Gyöngyi (Ind.)

Area
  - Total: 7.73 km^{2} (2.98 sq mi)

Population (2022)
  - Total: 88
  - Density: 11/km^{2} (29/sq mi)
- Time zone: UTC+1 (CET)
  - Summer (DST): UTC+2 (CEST)
- Postal code: 8761
- Area code: 92

Zalaigrice is a village in Zala County, Hungary.
