= Öcs =

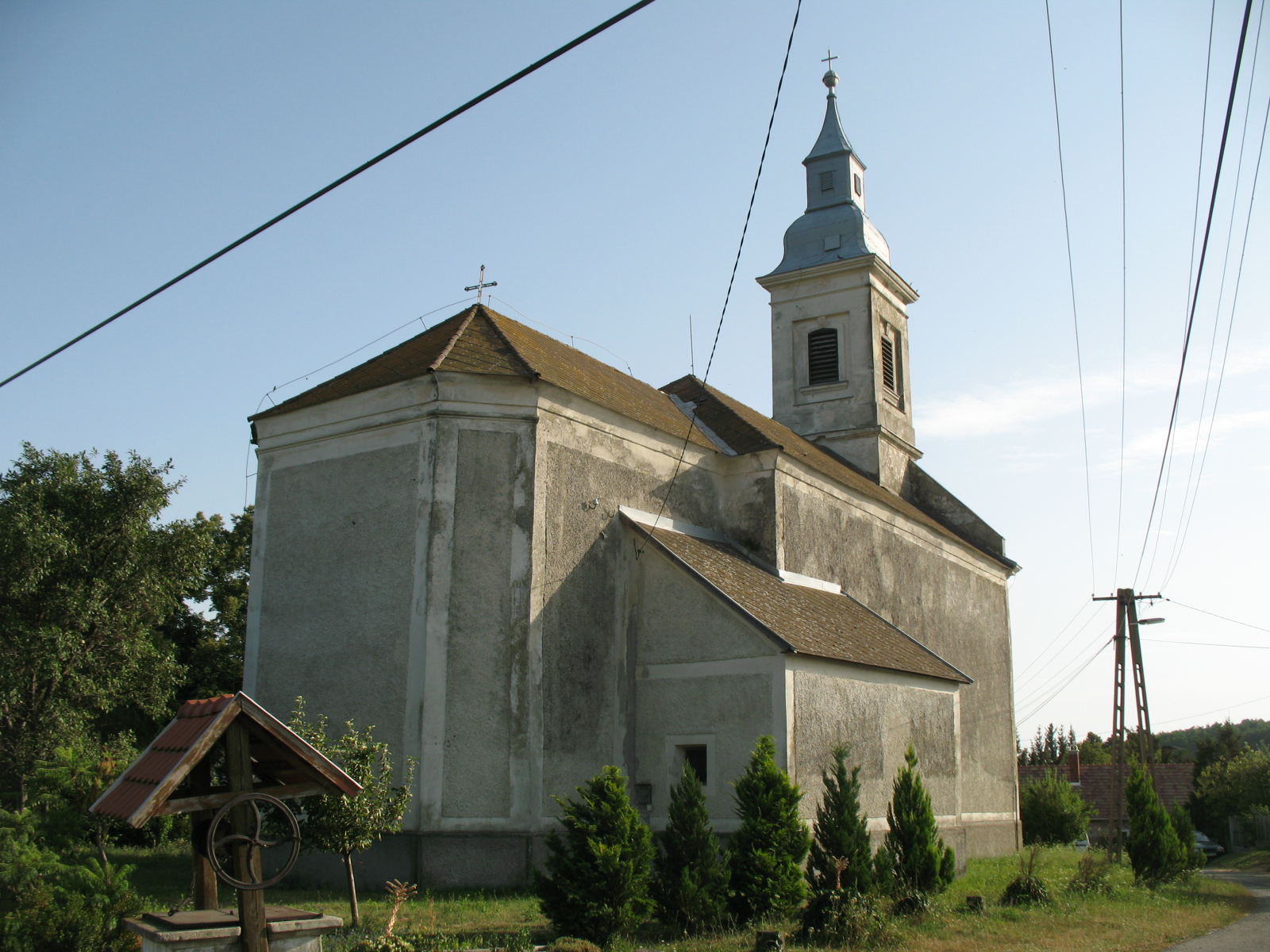
- Church of Öcs

- Coat of arms

- Location of Veszprém county in Hungary

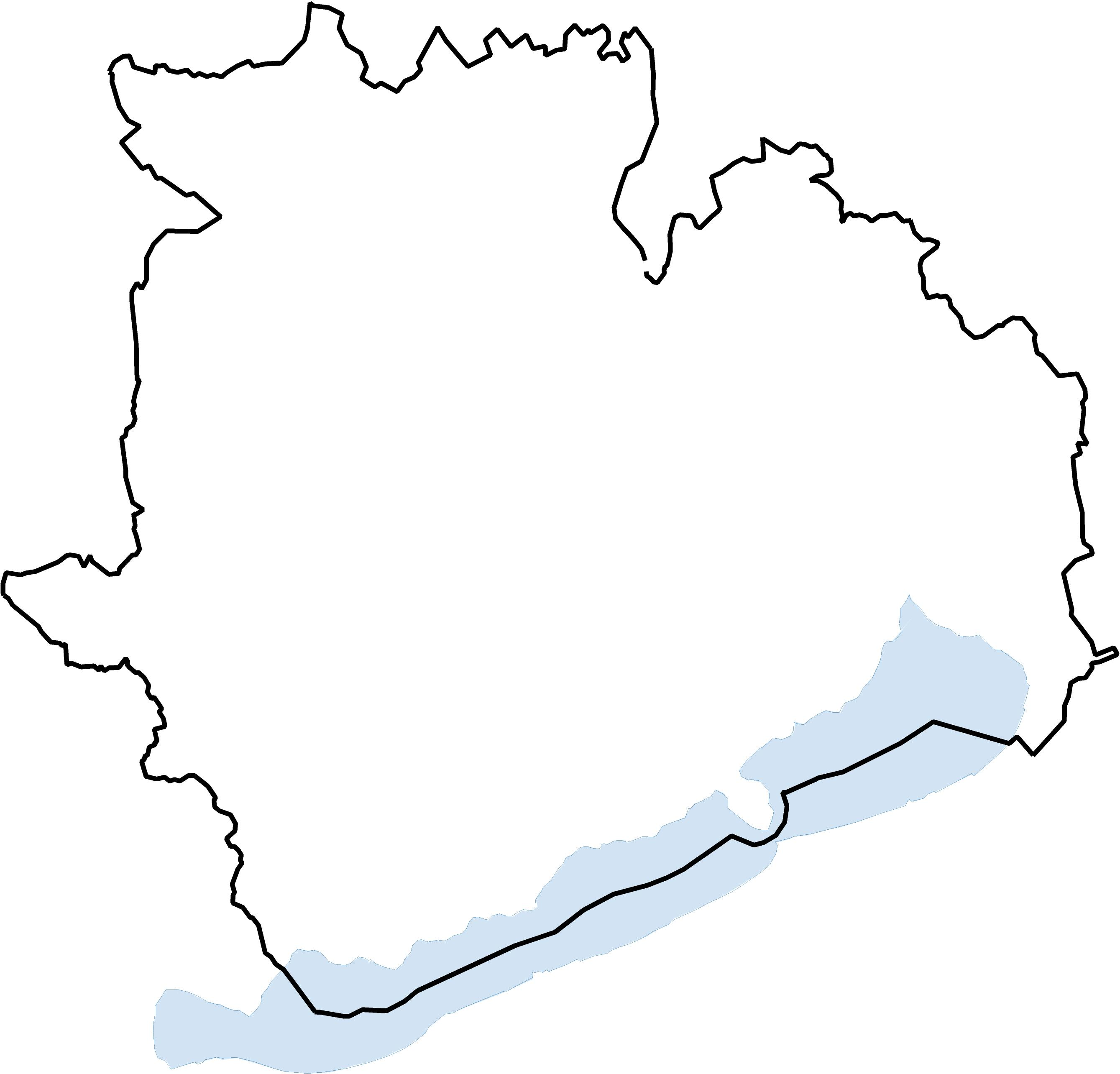
- Location within Veszprém County Location within Hungary
- Coordinates: 47°00′07″N 17°36′53″E
- Country: Hungary
- County: Veszprém

Area
  - Total: 13.7 km^{2} (5.3 sq mi)

Population (2004)
  - Total: 238
  - Density: 17.37/km^{2} (45.0/sq mi)
- Time zone: UTC+1 (CET)
  - Summer (DST): UTC+2 (CEST)
- Postal code: 8292
- Area code: 88

Öcs is a village in Ajka district, Veszprém county, Hungary.

== History ==
The area of the village was inhabited even in early historical times. Prehistoric, Roman, Celtic, Avar, and Hungarian conquest-era artifacts have been unearthed in various places in the vicinity of the settlement.

The first written record of the settlement dates back to 1278 under the name Ech. The village served as a link between the northern landscape beyond the mountains and the Balaton Highlands to the east.

The village was inhabited by single nobles, and although it depopulated multiple times, it was always rebuilt. In later times, the village name originated from the Ichy and Nemes Eöcsy family names. The entire territory belonged to noble mansions. Until the 16th century, its society consisted solely of nobles. In the 17th century, the population mingled with commoners. By 1828, the situation changed significantly as the number of settled peasants, both with and without houses, became so large that they formed the majority.

The village was deserted multiple times, especially in the 17th century when it became a wasteland. In the 18th century, the four denominations were established in the settlement. At that time, the inhabitants were 400 Roman Catholics, 301 Lutherans, 200 Calvinists, and 150 Jews.

During the serf emancipation, there was one large estate and 233 small holdings. In the first cadastre, its border was determined to be 2381 cadastral acres. Half of its territory was forest, while the rest consisted of arable land, meadows, pastures, and marshy areas.

The village was built in a valley basin, evolving from scattered houses, and its winding streets led from a central square to three churches. The characteristic star-shaped village structure is still preserved in the layout of the streets.

In the 1700s, four denominations erected churches here. The late Baroque Catholic church was completed in 1756, the Lutheran church in 1799, and the Reformed church and synagogue were built in the early 18th century. Three of these churches still stand today, while the former synagogue is now a residential house. In the 1800s, the village reached its peak population of around 1,000. At that time, the natural environment provided sustenance for the people, and seven artisan families lived in the village.

By 1940, only 500 people remained, and later even fewer. Industrialization and nearby mining provided livelihoods, causing people to move away after work. Today, the population is around 240.

Population:

- 1785: 581
- 1910: 612
- 1970: 510
- 1986: 327
- 1998: 258
- 2002: 240
- 2006: 227
- 2007: 235
- 2008: 231

The first agricultural cooperative was formed in 1950 under the name "New Life." It dissolved in 1956, then reformed as the "Constitution Cooperative" and merged with Halimba in 1959. During subsequent mergers, it first joined Nyirád and later Devecser. The cooperative ceased to exist in the 1990s through liquidation. In 1970, the Municipal Council merged with Halimba and operated as a Joint Municipal Council.

The establishment of independent local self-government created a new situation, and the village sought its place in the narrower and broader region. The village played a role in the development of the Dörögdi Basin (construction of a new road towards Taliándörgő, cultural events). The exploration and preservation of the natural and cultural-historical values of the village began (local nature reserves, properties, local history collection).

Although there are summary works on the history of the village, unfortunately, there is no comprehensive village history. The present-day coat of arms of the village was created based on archival letters and seals found in the Veszprém County Archives (2001). The crown in the emblem refers to the former noble settlement, the double-curved contour symbolizes the location of the village, the silver-armored figure holding a saber in a green field comes from an old seal impression, and the upper part of the emblem represents the symbols of the village's three denominations.

=== Jewish history of Öcs ===
Öcs used to have a sizable Jewish population that was mostly wiped out during the Holocaust. There is still a Jewish cemetery that was cleaned up and restored in 2009.

== Gallery ==
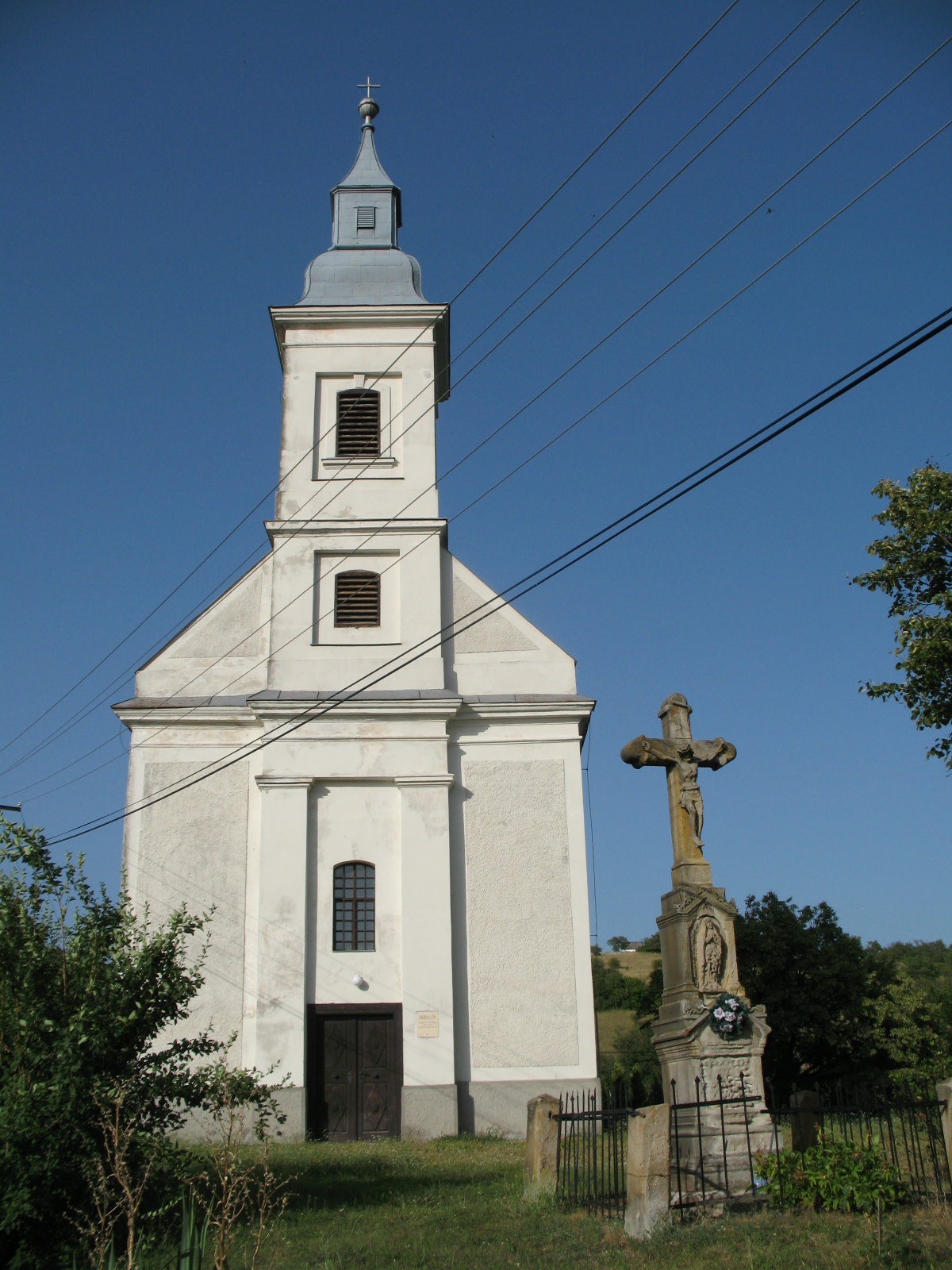
Catholic Church of Öcs

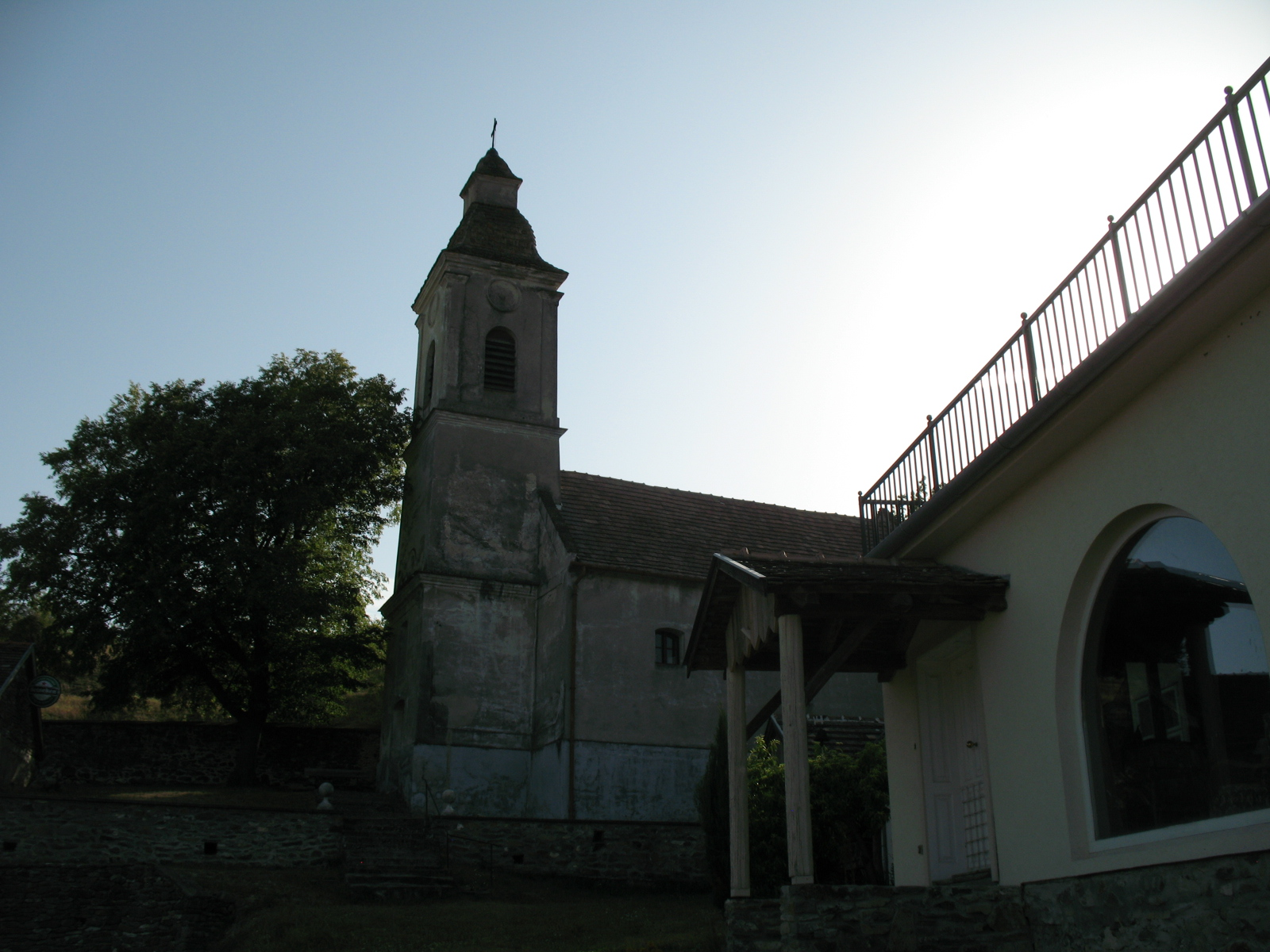
Evangelical church of Öcs

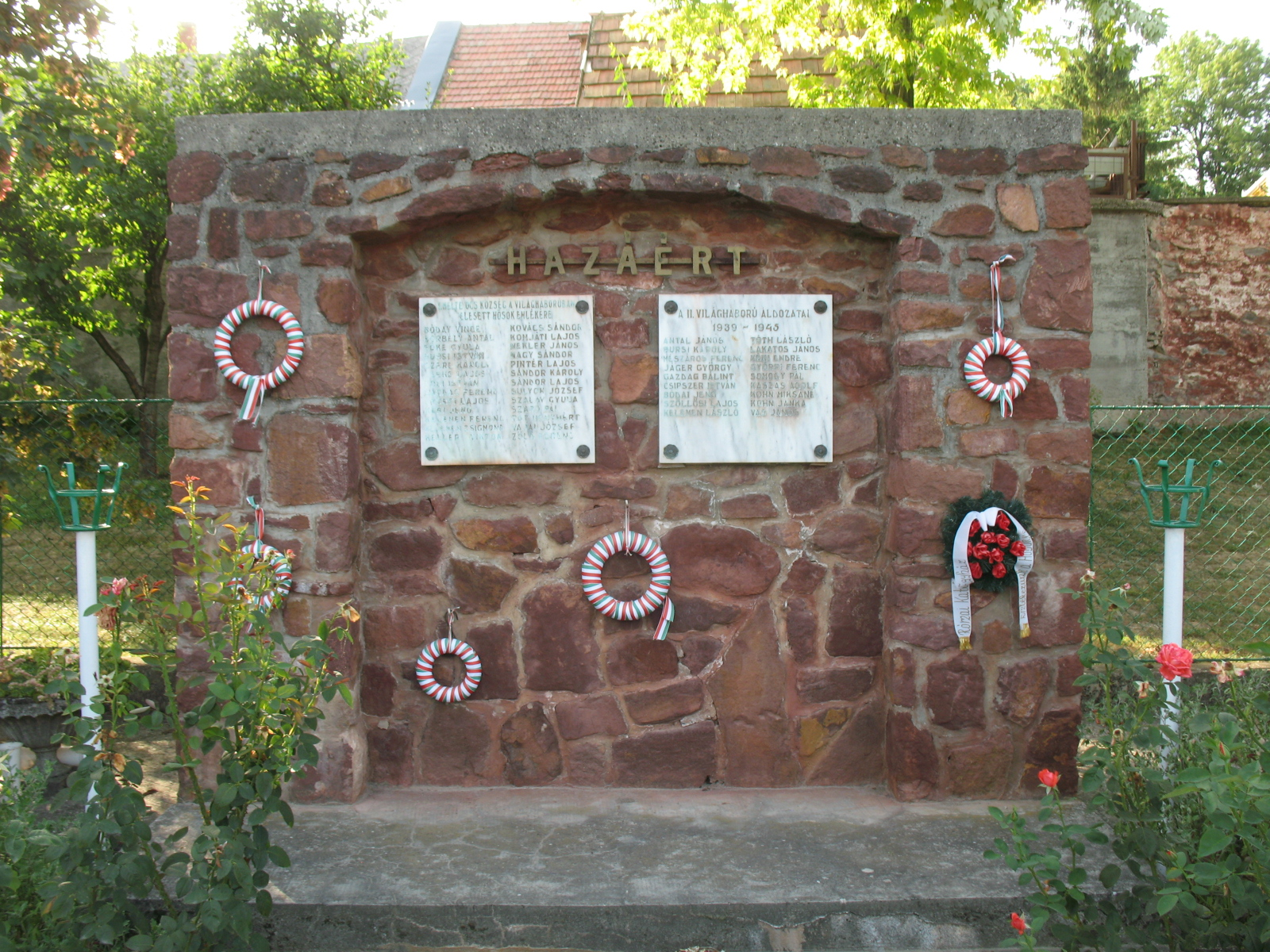
Memorial to the fallen sons and daughters of Öcs from the World Wars

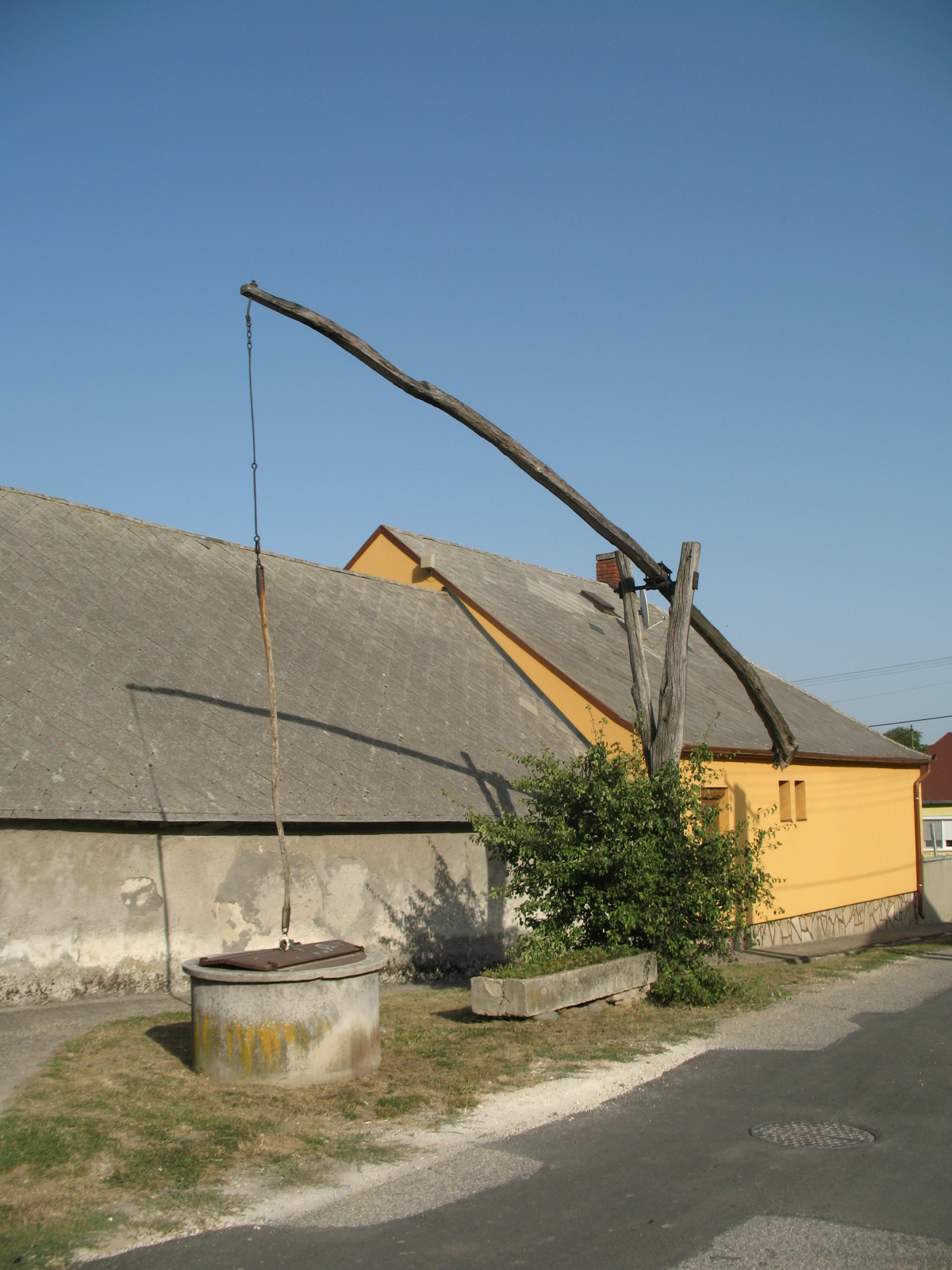
Shadoof in Öcs

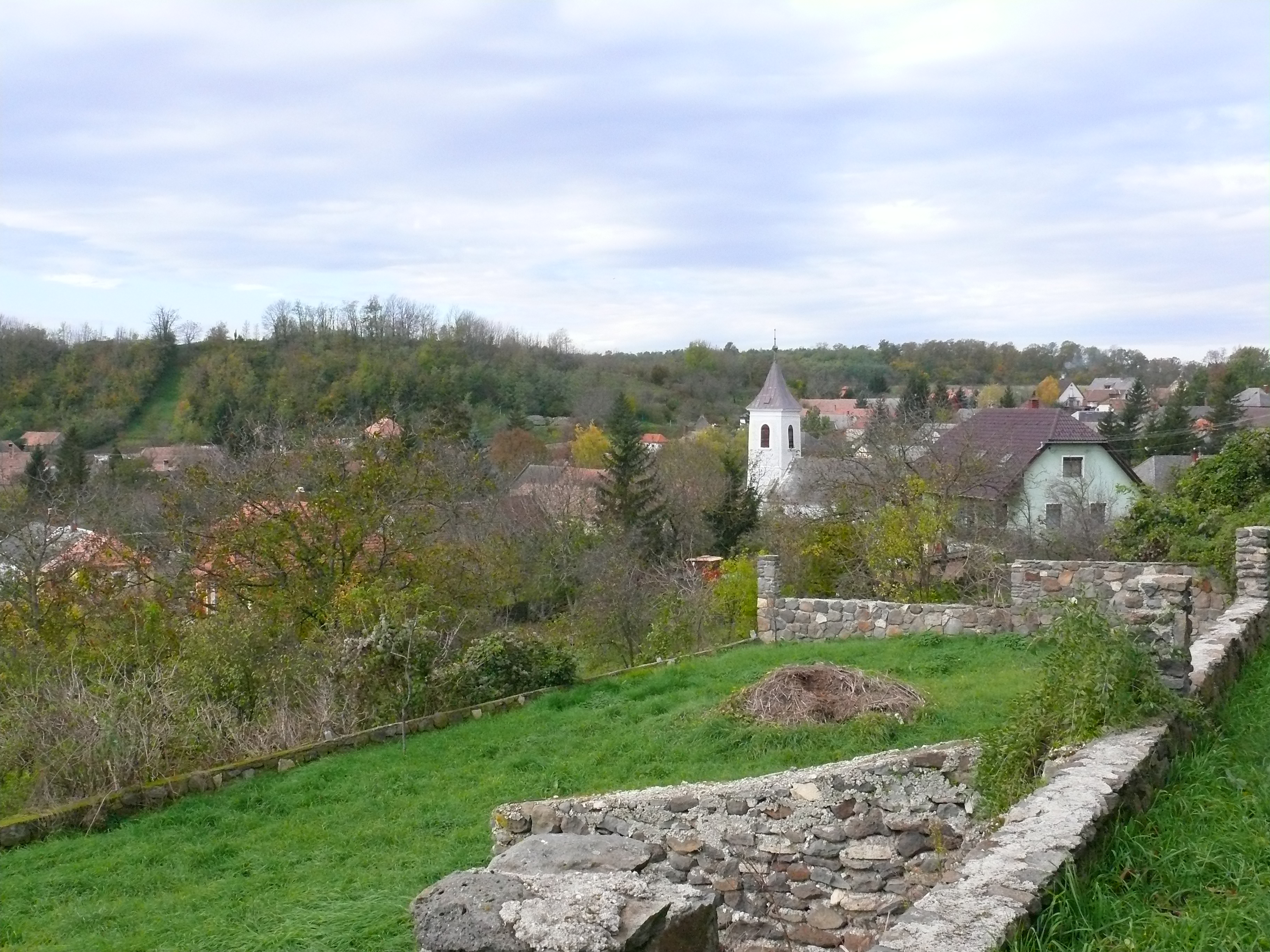
A panorama picture of Öcs including the Evangelical church
