= Zalaszentlászló =

Coordinates: 46°53′N 17°07′E

- Village
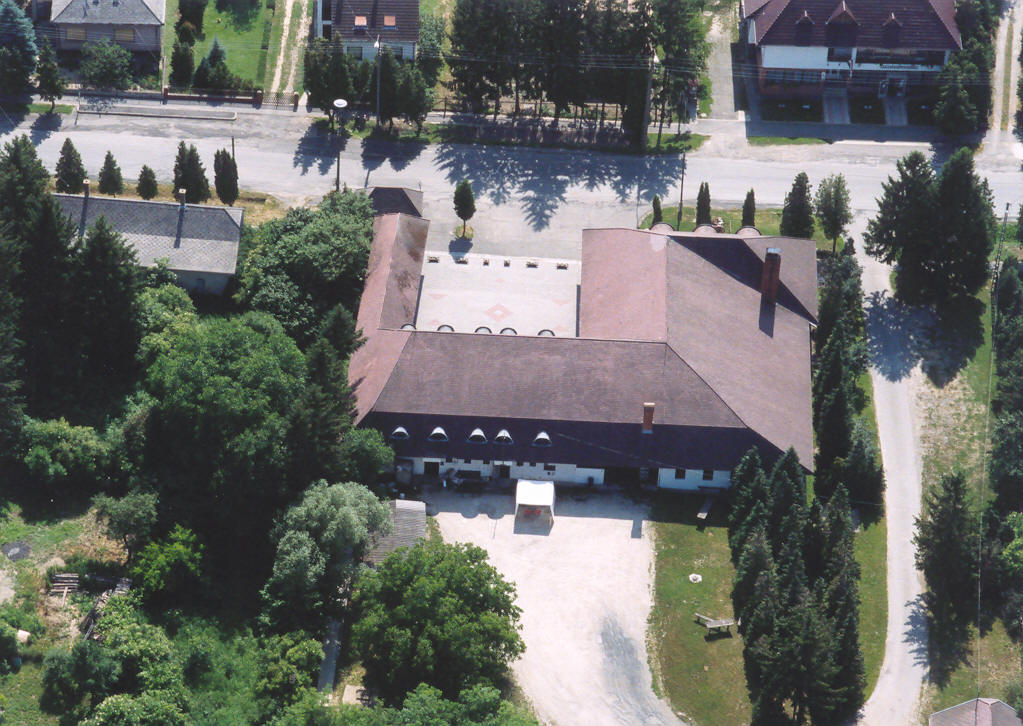
- Zalaszentlaszlo
- Interactive map of Zalaszentlászló
- Country: Hungary
- Region: Western Transdanubia
- County: Zala County
- Time zone: UTC+1 (CET)
  - Summer (DST): UTC+2 (CEST)

Zalaszentlászló is a village in Zala County, Hungary.
