= Nyirád =

- Flag Coat of arms
- Interactive map of Nyirád
- Location of Nyirád
- Coordinates: 47.00337°N 17.45055°E
- Country: Hungary

Population (2019)
  - Total: 1,809
  - Density: 30.8/km^{2} (80/sq mi)
- Time zone: UTC+1 (CET)
  - Summer (DST): UTC+2 (CEST)
- Postal code: 8454
- Area code: 88

Nyirád is a village in Ajka District, Veszprém County, Hungary. As of 2019 it had a population of 1809.

The Nyirád Racing Center is a rallycross and autocross circuit opened in 2006.
