= Zalaerdőd =

- Flag Coat of arms

- Location of Veszprém county in Hungary

- Location of Zalaerdőd
- Coordinates: 47.05641°N 17.13922°E
- Country: Hungary
- County: Veszprém

Area
  - Total: 17.69 km^{2} (6.83 sq mi)

Population (2004)
  - Total: 314
  - Density: 17.75/km^{2} (46.0/sq mi)
- Time zone: UTC+1 (CET)
  - Summer (DST): UTC+2 (CEST)
- Postal code: 8344
- Area code: 87

Zalaerdőd is a village in Veszprém county, Hungary.
