= Kővágóörs =

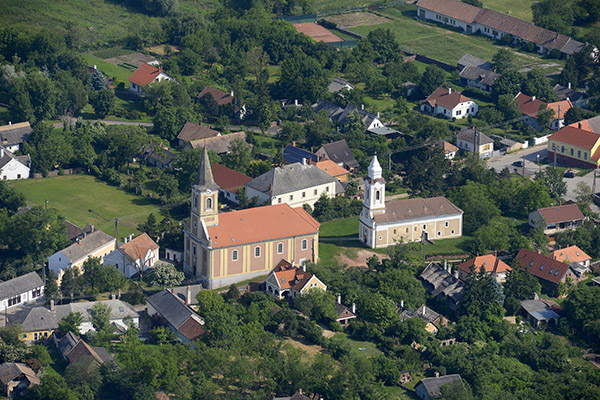
- Aerial view of the churches

- Flag Coat of arms

- Location of Kővágóörs
- Coordinates: 46.84905°N 17.59905°E
- Country: Hungary
- County: Veszprém

Area
  - Total: 22.09 km^{2} (8.53 sq mi)

Population (2017)
  - Total: 740
  - Density: 33/km^{2} (87/sq mi)
- Time zone: UTC+1 (CET)
  - Summer (DST): UTC+2 (CEST)
- Postal code: 8254
- Area code: 87
- Website: http://www.kovagoors.hu/

Kővágóörs is a village in Veszprém county, Hungary. It is one of the largest settlements in the Káli basin. It has 914 inhabitants (2001).

== History ==
Kővágóörs is landscape protection area, built on a unique geological formation, the fossil sand hill of the Pannon-age Sea.

Stone was quarried throughout centuries here. Excellent millstones (raw material of bastions and buildings) could be prepared from this kind of stone, thus the first part of the name of the village - "stone cutting" ("kővágó"). Today people call this phenomenon of nature the “sea of stones”.

The second part of the town's name originates from the Örs clan. This area was the clan's principal territory at the time of Árpád’s conquest of Hungary, accordingly Kővágóörs was seat of “alispán” or “ispán” (comes).

Three surrounding medieval villages (Ecser, Sóstókál, and Kisörs) were destroyed at the time of the fall of the Ottoman Empire, and the ruins of their respective churches can be seen nearby.

The poet Mihály Barla lived here.

== Sights ==
- The village has two churches: the older one nowadays used by Lutheran people was built in 1264 and was renovated in Baroque style in the 18th century; the Baroque Catholic church built in front of the Lutheran one was consecrated in 1802.
- The “sea of stones” (read more about it in the history of Kővágóörs)
- Museum of Bajcsy-Zsilinszky Endre

== People ==
- Mihály Barla
- Rudolf Czipott, lived here
- Samuel Gold, a Jewish chess player, born here

== Sources ==
- Somogyi Győző - Szelényi Károly „The Kál Basin by Lake Balaton” 1992
