= Halimba =

- Flag Coat of arms

- Location of Veszprém county in Hungary

- Location of Halimba
- Coordinates: 47.03312°N 17.53579°E
- Country: Hungary
- County: Veszprém

Area
  - Total: 12.62 km^{2} (4.87 sq mi)

Population (2004)
  - Total: 1,145
  - Density: 90.72/km^{2} (235.0/sq mi)
- Time zone: UTC+1 (CET)
  - Summer (DST): UTC+2 (CEST)
- Postal code: 8452
- Area code: 88

Halimba (Hungarian pronunciation: [ˈhɒlimbɒ]) is a village in Veszprém county, Hungary.
