= Jenő Lasztovicza =

Hungarian politician

Member of the National Assembly
- In office 18 June 1998 – 8 January 2015

Personal details
- Born: 21 December 1961 Kiskőrös, Hungary
- Died: 8 January 2015 (aged 53)
- Party: Fidesz (since 1994)
- Children: Dóra; Jenő; Máté
- Profession: horticultural engineer, politician

Jenő Lasztovicza (21 December 1961 – 8 January 2015) was a Hungarian horticultural engineer, politician and member of the National Assembly (MP) for Tapolca (Veszprém County Constituency IV then III) from 1998 until his death in early 2015.

He joined Fidesz in November 1994 and was the party president in his town from 1998 until his death. He secured a seat as an MP in the 1998 parliamentary elections representing Tapolca. He was the deputy chairman of the Tourism Committee in the 1998–2002 term and was also active on the Regional Development Committee. From 15 July 1999 until the change of government in 2002 he held the position of Chairman of the Board of Tourism, the advisory body on tourism of the Minister of Economy. In the 2002 general elections he was elected incumbent MP for Tapolca in the first round on 7 April. He chaired the Committee on Sport and Tourism from the inauguration of the Parliament on 15 May 2002 to 24 October 2006. He secured a seat as an MP in the 2006 elections representing Tapolca again. He was the Vice Chairman of the Committee on Sport and Tourism.

Lasztovicza died on 8 January 2015, aged 53.

== Personal life ==
He was married and had a daughter, Dóra and two sons, Jenő and Máté.
