= Zalahaláp =

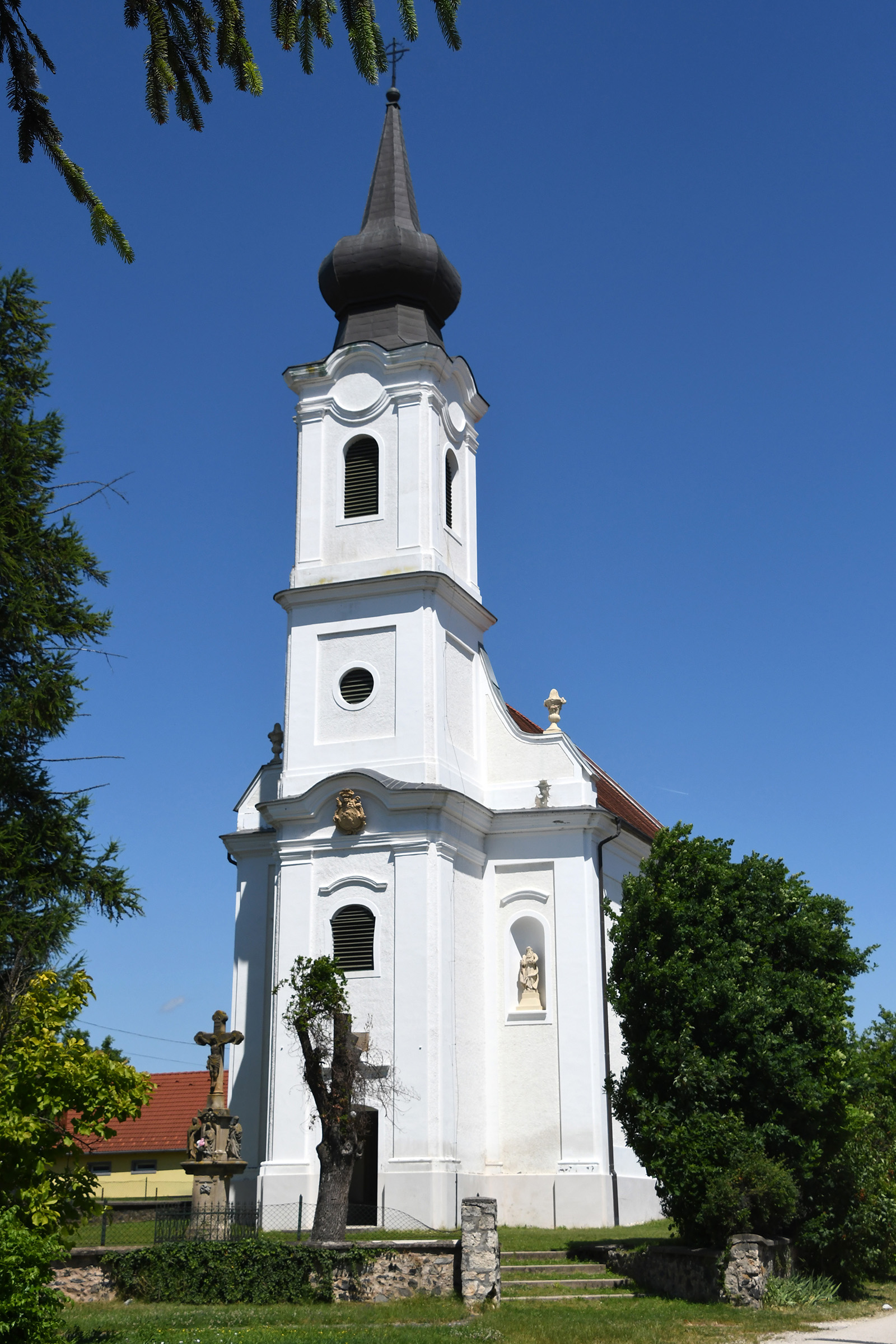
- Church of Saint Joseph

- Flag Coat of arms

- Location of Veszprém county in Hungary

- Location of Zalahaláp
- Coordinates: 46.91471°N 17.45712°E
- Country: Hungary
- County: Veszprém

Area
  - Total: 24.13 km^{2} (9.32 sq mi)

Population (2004)
  - Total: 1,164
  - Density: 48.23/km^{2} (124.9/sq mi)
- Time zone: UTC+1 (CET)
  - Summer (DST): UTC+2 (CEST)
- Postal code: 8308
- Area code: 87
- Website: https://www.zalahalap.hu/

Zalahaláp is a village in Veszprém county, Hungary.
