= Zalameggyes =

- Flag Coat of arms

- Location of Veszprém county in Hungary

- Location of Zalameggyes
- Coordinates: 47.08063°N 17.21931°E
- Country: Hungary
- County: Veszprém

Area
  - Total: 2.56 km^{2} (0.99 sq mi)

Population (2004)
  - Total: 58
  - Density: 22.65/km^{2} (58.7/sq mi)
- Time zone: UTC+1 (CET)
  - Summer (DST): UTC+2 (CEST)
- Postal code: 8348
- Area code: 87

Zalameggyes is a village in Veszprém county, Hungary.
