= Farkasgyepű =

Farkasgyepű _{Wirtshäusl}
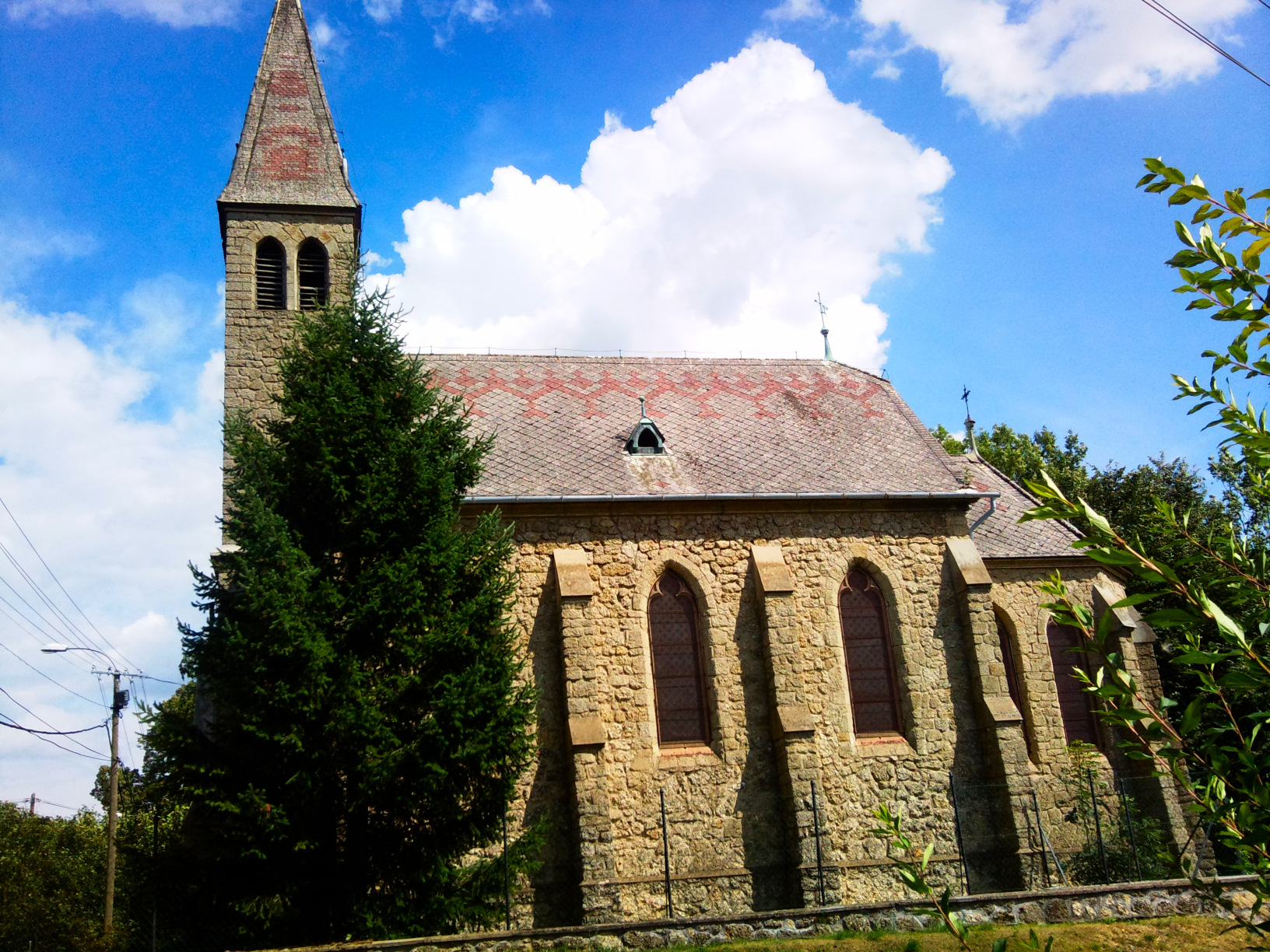
- Catholic church

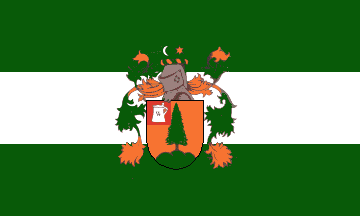
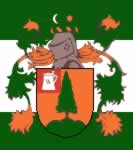
- Flag Coat of arms

- Location of Veszprém county in Hungary

- Location of Farkasgyepű
- Coordinates: 47.121285°N 17.375412°E
- Country: Hungary
- County: Veszprém

Government
  - Mayor: Takácsné Légrádi Edina (Ind.)

Area
  - Total: 10.05 km^{2} (3.88 sq mi)

Population (2022)
  - Total: 371
  - Density: 36.9/km^{2} (95.6/sq mi)
- Time zone: UTC+1 (CET)
  - Summer (DST): UTC+2 (CEST)
- Postal code: 8582
- Area code: 89
- Website: www.farkasgyepu.hu

Farkasgyepű (German: Wirtshäusl) is a village in Veszprém county, Hungary.
