= Ajka =

- Town
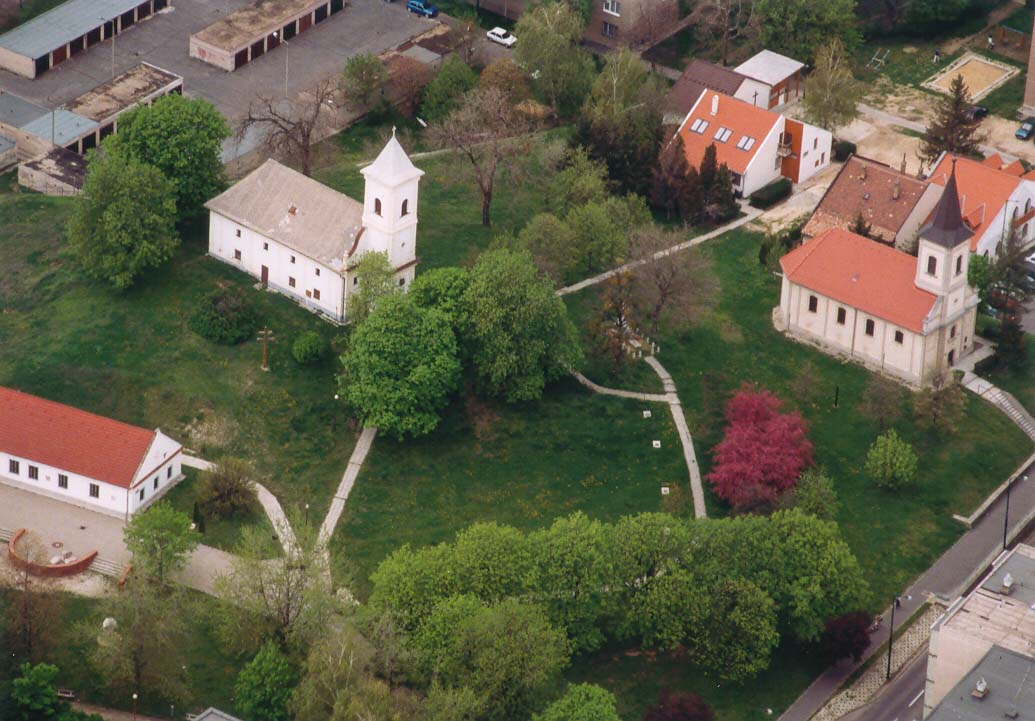
- Aerial view

- Flag Coat of arms

- Location within Hungary Location within Europe
- Coordinates: 47.1006°N 17.5522°E
- Country: Hungary
- County: Veszprém
- District: Ajka

Area
  - Total: 95.05 km^{2} (36.70 sq mi)

Population (2024)
  - Total: 26,408
- Postal code: 8400
- Area code: (+36) 88
- Website: www.ajka.hu

Ajka (Hungarian pronunciation: [ˈɒjkɒ]) is a city in Hungary with about 27,000 inhabitants. It is situated in the hills of Bakony.

== History ==
Around 1000 BCE, the area was inhabited by Celts. By the second century CE, the territory was conquered by the Romans. The Hungarians occupied the area in the early 10th century.

The village Ajka was named after the Ajka clan, which, in turn, got its name after its ancestor, a knight named Heiko, who was a member of the retinue of Gisela, Princess of Bavaria, wife of King St. Stephen in the early 11th century. The village itself was first mentioned in 1214, when it was already about 100 years old.

The village slowly developed during the next few centuries. Real prosperity came only in the second half of the 19th century, when coal resources were found nearby. In the 1930s, vast bauxite resources were found, too. In 1937, the world's first krypton factory was built near Ajka.

During the industrialization wave of the Socialist Communist era, Ajka was a natural choice to build a new industrial town. The new town – like several other industrial cities and towns – came into existence with the unification of several villages. Today's Ajka was created on January 1, 1960, by the unification of four villages (Ajka, Bódé, Tósok, and Tósokberénd). In the following decades, four additional villages (Csékút, Bakonygyepes, Padragkút, and Ajkarendek) were annexed to the town. At the time of the unification, Ajka had 15,375 residents. Many workers came to Ajka to find new jobs and homes there. Most of the population is working class.

At the end of the 19th century and the beginning of the 20th century, Jews lived in the village. In 1840, 93 Jews lived in the village and there was a Jewish cemetery there. Some of them were murdered in the Holocaust.

In 2010 the Ajkaceratops was named in honor of the town, where it was discovered.

== Main sights ==
- Roman Catholic Church of Tósokberénd (late baroque, 1807–1808)
- Roman Catholic Church of Ajka (late baroque, 1788)
- Reformed Church of Ajka (late baroque, 1783)
- Evangelical Church of Ajka (late baroque, 1786–89)
- House of the Steward (manor house, 18-19th centuries)
- Museum of Mining (industrial heritage site)
- Crystal Glass Factory

== Ajka alumina plant accident ==
A flood of bauxite tailings occurred in 2010, releasing 600,000 to 700,000 m^{3} (21,188,800 to 24,720,267 cu ft) of red caustic toxic industrial sludge, which affected some 40 km^{2} (15 sq mi); 10 people were killed and 150 were injured.

== Twin towns – sister cities ==
Ajka is twinned with:

- Cristuru Secuiesc, Romania
- Donghai County, China
- Rovaniemi, Finland
- Unna, Germany
- Weiz, Austria

== Sport ==
- FC Ajka, association football club
