= Vas County 2nd constituency =

Constituency in Hungary (2014–)

Vas County 2nd constituency (Sárvár)
- Constituency for the National Assembly
- Location of Vas county 02 within Vas county

- Location of Vas county within Hungary
- County: Vas
- Electorate: 66,913 (2026)
- Major settlements: Sárvár

Current constituency
- Created: 2011
- Party: Fidesz–KDNP
- Member: Péter Ágh
- Elected: 2014, 2018, 2022, 2026

The 2nd constituency of Vas County (Hungarian: Vas megyei 02. számú országgyűlési egyéni választókerület) is one of the single member constituencies of the National Assembly, the national legislature of Hungary. The constituency standard abbreviation: Vas 02. OEVK.

Since 2014, it has been represented by Péter Ágh of the Fidesz–KDNP party alliance.

== Geography ==
The 2nd constituency is located in northern part of Vas County.

=== List of municipalities ===
The constituency includes the following municipalities:

1. Acsád
2. Bozzai
3. Bozsok
4. Bő
5. Bögöt
6. Bük
7. Cák
8. Celldömölk
9. Chernelházadamonya
10. Csánig
11. Csénye
12. Csepreg
13. Csönge
14. Gencsapáti
15. Gór
16. Gyöngyösfalu
17. Hegyfalu
18. Horvátzsidány
19. Iklanberény
20. Jákfa
21. Kemenesmagasi
22. Kemenesmihályfa
23. Kemenessömjén
24. Kemenesszentmárton
25. Kenyeri
26. Kiszsidány
27. Kőszeg
28. Kőszegdoroszló
29. Kőszegpaty
30. Kőszegszerdahely
31. Lócs
32. Lukácsháza
33. Mersevát
34. Mesterháza
35. Mesteri
36. Meszlen
37. Nagygeresd
38. Nagysimonyi
39. Nemesbőd
40. Nemescsó
41. Nemesládony
42. Nick
43. Ólmod
44. Ostffyasszonyfa
45. Ölbő
46. Pápoc
47. Perenye
48. Peresznye
49. Porpác
50. Pósfa
51. Pusztacsó
52. Rábapaty
53. Répcelak
54. Répceszentgyörgy
55. Sajtoskál
56. Salköveskút
57. Sárvár
58. Simaság
59. Sitke
60. Söpte
61. Szeleste
62. Szergény
63. Tokorcs
64. Tompaládony
65. Tormásliget
66. Tömörd
67. Uraiújfalu
68. Vámoscsalád
69. Vasasszonyfa
70. Vasegerszeg
71. Vassurány
72. Vasszilvágy
73. Vát
74. Velem
75. Vép
76. Vönöck
77. Zsédeny

== Members ==
The constituency was first represented by Péter Ágh of the Fidesz from 2014, and he was re-elected in 2018.

Election	Member	Party	%
2014	Péter Ágh	Fidesz	
2018	Péter Ágh	Fidesz	61.38
2022	Péter Ágh	Fidesz	64.38
2026	Péter Ágh	Fidesz	46.25

== Election results ==
=== Elections in the 2020s ===
2026 election: Vas - 2nd constituency
Party	Candidate	Votes	%	±%
Fidesz-KDNP	Péter Ágh	25,700	46.25	−18.13
Tisza	Viktória Strompová	25,452	45.80	N/A
Mi Hazánk	Ferenc Dala	3,069	5.52	−0.34
Independent	Péter Magyar (Note: Not the future prime minister)	909	1.64	N/A
DK	Gábor Deák	440	0.79	As EM
Majority		-	-	−
Turnout		-	-	−
Registered electors		66,913		
Fidesz hold		Swing	-	

2022 election: Vas - 2nd constituency
Party	Candidate	Votes	%	±%
Fidesz-KDNP	Péter Ágh	32,226	64.38	+3.00
United for Hungary (MSZP)	Kornél Hencz	13,026	26.02	−11.12
Mi Hazánk	József Giczy	2,933	5.86	N/A
MKKP	Tamás Zakota	1,137	2.27	N/A
MEMO	Sándor Horváth	441	0.88	N/A
NÉP	Zoltán Rutkai	294	0.59	N/A
Majority		19,200	38.36	−4.78
Turnout		50,613	74.33	+0.72
Registered electors		68,087		
Fidesz-KDNP hold		Swing	+7.06	
