= Kőszeg District =

Coordinates: 47.38823895856693°N 16.541894474497926°E

Kőszeg District Kőszegi járás
- Districts of Hungary
- Coat of arms

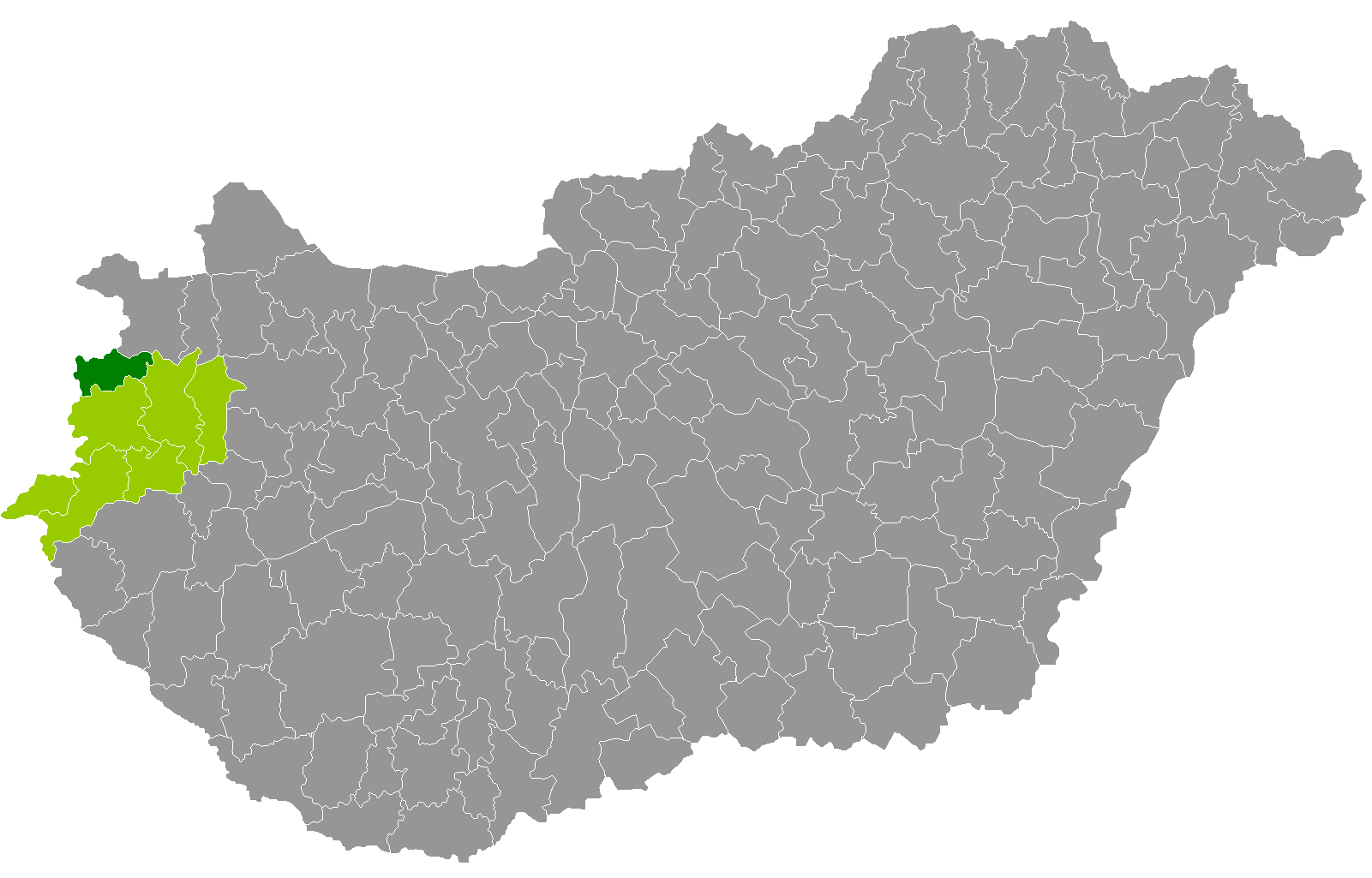
- Kőszeg District within Hungary and Vas County.
- Country: Hungary
- County: Vas
- District seat: Kőszeg

Area
  - Total: 286.45 km^{2} (110.60 sq mi)
  - Rank: 6th in Vas

Population (2011 census)
  - Total: 25,090
  - Rank: 4th in Vas
  - Density: 88/km^{2} (230/sq mi)

Kőszeg (Hungarian: Kőszegi járás) is a district in north-western part of Vas County. Kőszeg is also the name of the town where the district seat is found. The district is located in the Western Transdanubia Statistical Region.

== Geography ==
Kőszeg District borders with Sopron District (Győr-Moson-Sopron County) to the northeast, Sárvár District to the east, Szombathely District to the south, the Austrian state of Burgenland to the west and north. The number of the inhabited places in Kőszeg District is 21.

== Municipalities ==
The district has 3 towns and 18 villages. (ordered by population, as of 1 January 2013)

- Bozsok (343)
- **Bük** (3,454)
- Cák (285)
- **Csepreg** (3,275)
- Gyöngyösfalu (1,144)
- Horvátzsidány (808)
- Iklanberény (46)
- Kiszsidány (87)
- **Kőszeg** (11,628) – district seat
- Kőszegdoroszló (243)
- Kőszegpaty (208)
- Kőszegszerdahely (459)
- Lócs (128)
- Lukácsháza (1,055)
- Nemescsó (283)
- Ólmod (101)
- Peresznye (841)
- Pusztacsó (149)
- Tormásliget (317)
- Tömörd (282)
- Velem (337)

The bolded municipalities are cities.

== Demographics ==
Religion in Kőszeg District (2011 census)
1. Catholic Church (56.9%)
2. Greek Catholicism (0.10%)
3. Lutheranism (6.90%)
4. Calvinism (1.70%)
5. Other religions (0.80%)
6. Non-religious (5.40%)
7. Atheists (0.70%)
8. Undeclared (27.5%)

In 2011, it had a population of 25,090 and the population density was 88/km^{2}.

Year	County population	Change
2011	25,090	n/a

=== Ethnicity ===
Besides the Hungarian majority, the main minorities are the Croat and German (approx. 1,100) and Roma (200).

Total population (2011 census): 25,090
Ethnic groups (2011 census): Identified themselves: 23,694 persons:

- Hungarians: 21,052 (88.85%)
- Croats: 1,108 (4.68%)
- Germans: 1,062 (4.48%)
- Others and indefinable: 472 (1.99%)

Approx. 1,500 persons in Kőszeg District did not declare their ethnic group at the 2011 census.

=== Religion ===
Religious adherence in the county according to 2011 census:

- Catholic – 14,300 (Roman Catholic – 14,275; Greek Catholic – 23);
- Evangelical – 1,722;
- Reformed – 424;
- other religions – 214;
- Non-religious – 1,365;
- Atheism – 175;
- Undeclared – 6,890.

== See also ==
- List of cities and towns in Hungary
