= István Seregély =

Hungarian prelate

His Excellency István Seregély
- Archbishop of Eger
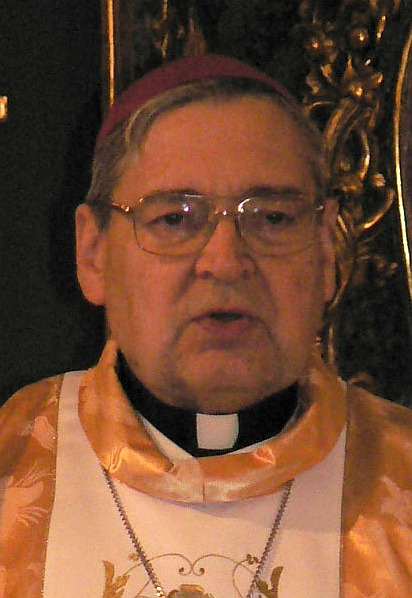
- István Seregély in 2010
- Church: Roman Catholic Church
- Archdiocese: Archdiocese of Eger
- Appointed: 5 June 1987
- Installed: 25 July 1987
- Term ended: 15 March 2007
- Predecessor: László Gábor Kádár
- Successor: Csaba Ternyák

Orders
- Ordination: 19 June 1955 by Sándor Kovács
- Consecration: 25 July 1987 by László Paskai

Personal details
- Born: 13 March 1931 Szombathely, Hungary
- Died: 31 December 2018 (aged 87) Nyíregyháza, Hungary
- Motto: Christus est via veritas et vita transl. "Christ is the way, the truth, and the life"

István Seregély (13 March 1931 – 31 December 2018) was a Hungarian prelate of the Roman Catholic Church, who served as Archbishop of Eger from 5 June 1987 to 15 March 2007.

== Priesthood ==
Seregély was born in Szombathely on 13 March 1931. His family moved to Miskolc in 1940. He finished his secondary studies at the György Fráter Catholic Secondary School (a legal predecessor of the Ferenc Földes Secondary School). He started his theological studies in the local seminary of Szombathely, but after its closure, he attended the Central Seminary of Budapest (Latin: Seminarium Centrale). He was ordained as a priest by Sándor Kovács, the Bishop of Szombathely on 19 June 1955.

From 1956 to 1963, he was chaplain in Gyöngyösfalu, Nyőgér, Bagod and Zalaegerszeg, then from 1963 to 1974, Cathedral of the Visitation of Our Lady in Szombathely. He was made vicar of Kőszegszerdahely by Bishop Árpád Fábián in 1974. He served in this position until 1981. All of four churches, which belonged to his parish – the All Saints Church of Kőszegszerdahely, the St. Vitus Church of Velem, the St. Peter and Paul Church of Cák and the St. Martin Church of Kőszegdoroszló – were renovated. He was vicar of Kőszeg from 1981 to 1987, and nine churches were renovated under his parsonage.

== Episcopal career ==
Pope John Paul II appointed him Archbishop of Eger on 5 June 1987. He was consecrated as bishop on 25 July by László Paskai at the Cathedral Basilica of St. John the Apostle. His motto was "Christus est via veritas et vita" ("Christ is the way, the truth, and the life").

Seregély was President of the Hungarian Catholic Bishops' Conference between 1990 and 2005, and simultaneously was also Grand Chancellor of the Pázmány Péter Catholic University from 1992 to 2005. He served as Vice President of the Council of the Bishops' Conferences of Europe (CCEE) from 1993 to 2001. He was awarded Fraknói Vilmos Prize in 2005.

After the appointment of Csaba Ternyák as his successor, Seregély functioned as apostolic governor of the Archdiocese of Eger since 15 March 2007. When Ternyák took the position on 9 June, Seregély became archbishop emeritus.

Seregély died on 31 December 2018 in a priest social home in Nyíregyháza.

== Publications ==
- Imádkozzál érettünk Istennek szent Anyja. Elmélkedések; Don Bosco, Budapest., 2001
- Krisztus az út, az igazság és az élet. Tizenöt év apostoli szolgálatban, 1-2.; Szent István Társulat, Bp., 2002-2003
- A magyar katolikus egyház a harmadik évezred küszöbén; Szent István Társulat, Bp., 2003 (Haza a magasban)
- A mi vendégünk története. Hittanregény; Szent István Társulat, Bp., 2003
- Nevelnek a szentek; Szent István Társulat, Bp., 2005
- Jézus Krisztus az élet és a szentség forrása. Ádventi és karácsonyi gondolatok évtizedek igehirdetésében; Szent István Társulat, Bp., 2006
- Magunkat nem hagyhatjuk el. Szerdahelyi Csongor beszélgetése Seregély István egri érsekkel; Szent István Társulat, Bp., 2007 (Pásztorok)
- Szűz Mária levelei. Elmélkedések a rózsafüzér titkairól; Szent István Társulat, Bp., 2007
- Jézus Krisztus az élet és a szentség forrása. Húsvéti gondolatok évtizedek igehirdetésében; Szent István Társulat, Bp., 2009
- Jézus Krisztus az élet és a szentség forrása. Nagyböjti gondolatok évtizedek igehirdetésében; Szent István Társulat, Bp., 2009
- Jézus Krisztus az élet és a szentség forrása. Püspöki gondolatok évtizedek igehirdetésében; Szent István Társulat, Bp., 2010
- Jézus Krisztus keresztútja. Seregély István elmélkedései Faykod Mária lourdes-i stációszobrairól készült fényképeivel; Szent István Társulat, Bp., 2010
- Jézus Krisztus keresztútja; Érseki Vagyonkezelő Központ, Eger, 2012
- Tanúságtétel. Válogatás az egri Szent István Rádióban 2002-2010 között elhangzott jegyzetekből; Szent István Társulat, Bp., 2012
- A kereszténység a vallás koronája. Válogatás az egri Szent István Rádióban elhangzott jegyzetekből; Szent István Társulat, Bp., 2013
- Szűz Mária levelei. Elmélkedések a rózsafüzér titkairól; Érseki Vagyonkezelő Központ, Eger, 2015

Catholic Church titles
Preceded by László Gábor Kádár	Archbishop of Eger; 1987–2007	Succeeded by Csaba Ternyák
