= Meszlen =

- Location of Vas county in Hungary

- Location of Meszlen
- Coordinates: 47.33324°N 16.70326°E
- Country: Hungary
- County: Vas

Area
  - Total: 12.02 km^{2} (4.64 sq mi)

Population (2004)
  - Total: 230
  - Density: 19.13/km^{2} (49.5/sq mi)
- Time zone: UTC+1 (CET)
  - Summer (DST): UTC+2 (CEST)
- Postal code: 9745
- Area code: 94

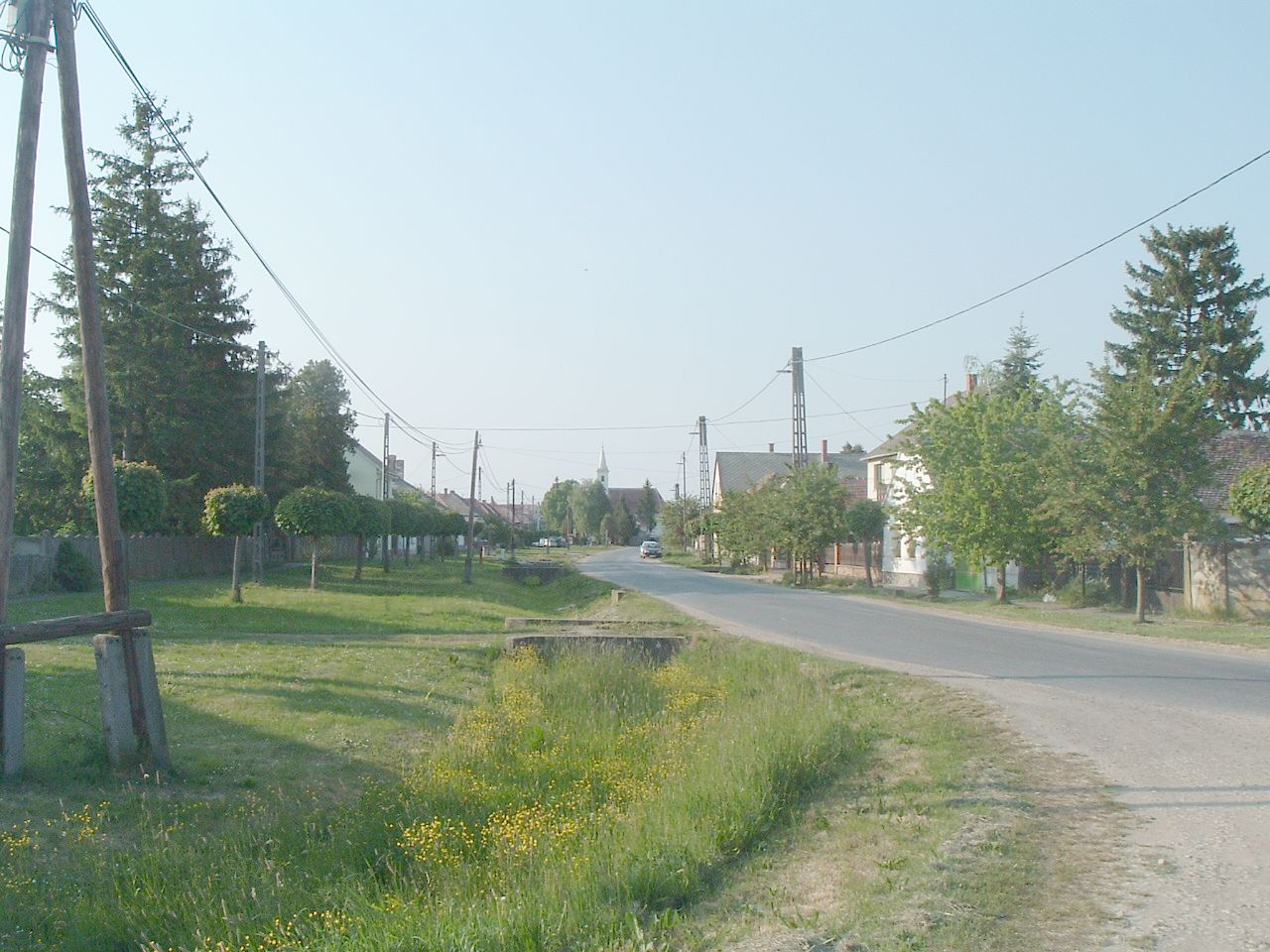
Main street of Meszlen

Meszlen is a village in Vas county, Hungary, located 15 kilometers northeast of Szombathely. Neighboring villages are Acsád, Csepreg, Tömörd, Vasasszonyfa, Salköveskút, Kőszegpaty.

== History ==
The place is inhabited from ancient times. Northwest of the village there are ancient kurgans. Roman remnants were also found. The first charter mentions it in 1255 as Mezlen. The village belonged to the servants of the Bishop of Győr. There was a ground fortress in the village neighbor: Világos. In 1910 the village had 640 Hungarian inhabitants.

== Landmarks ==
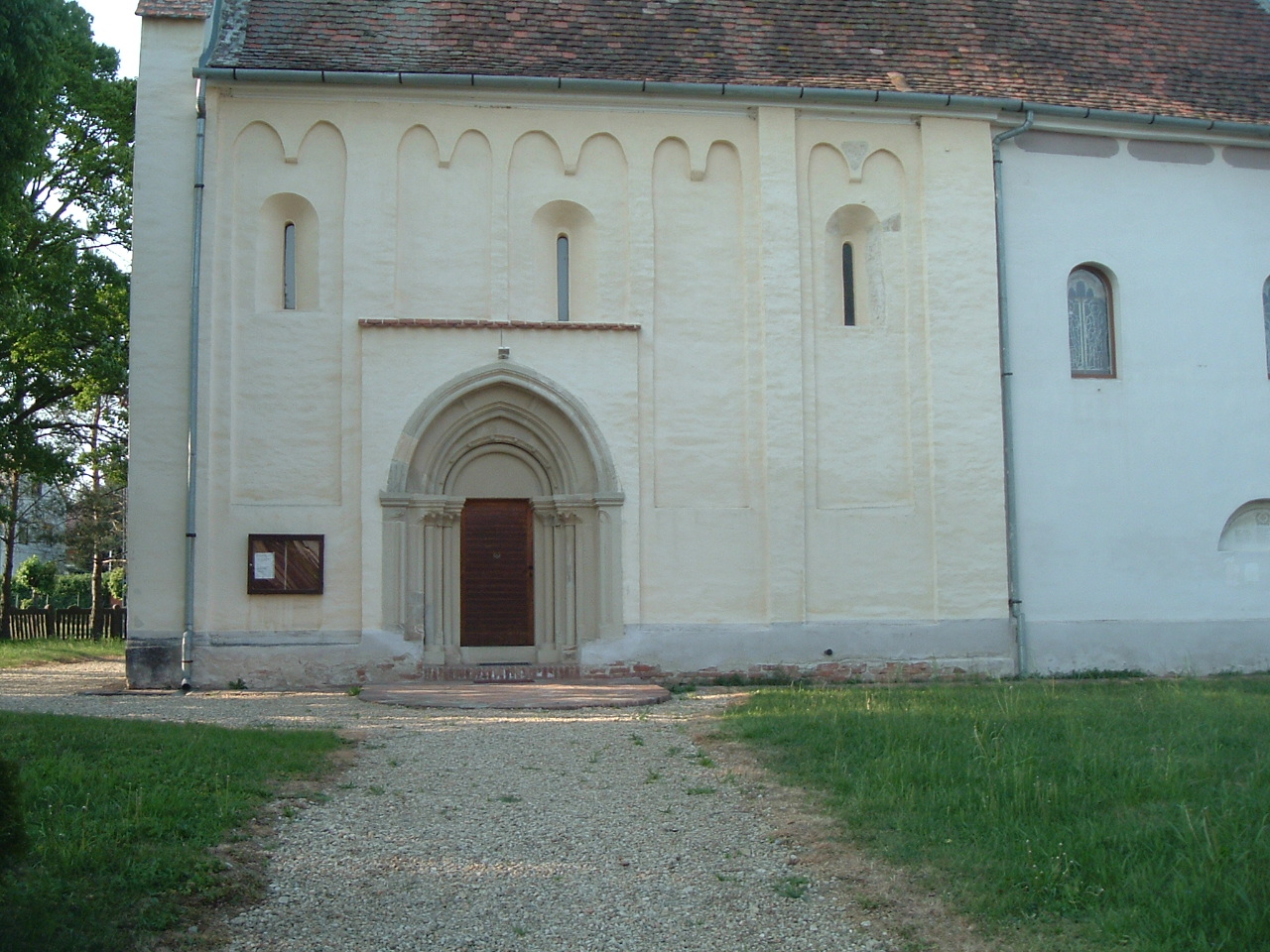
The Árpád age church of Meszlen with romanesque architectural details

The village has a church from the Árpád age, dated to the 13th century on the basis of architectural style elements, and which was mentioned in charter in 1430. In the 15th century the landowner was the Meszlényi family. In 1592 the church became the property of the Reformed Church. It was also the place of the county council and local parliament in 1598 and 1599. In the 18th century the Roman Catholic Church took back the church.
