= Tamás Bognár =

Hungarian football referee (born 1978)

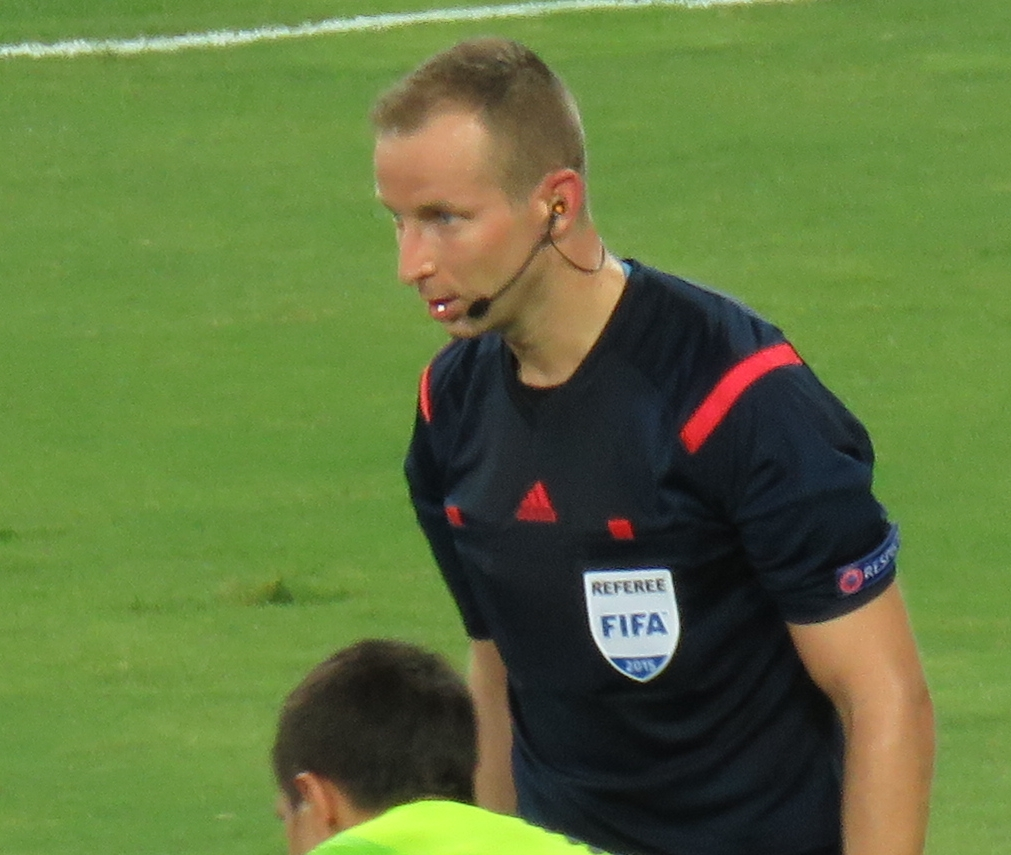
- Born: 18 November 1978 (age 47); Sárvár, Hungary

Domestic
Years	League	Role

International
Years	League	Role
2009–	FIFA listed	Referee

Tamás Bognár (born 18 November 1978) is a Hungarian professional football referee. He has been a full international for FIFA since 2009.
