= Miklós Hofer =

Hungarian architect

- Born: Miklós Hofer; 8 May 1931; Bozsok, Hungary
- Died: 10 January 2011; Budapest, Hungary
- Education: Technical University of Budapest
- Occupation: Architect

Miklós Hofer (8 May 1931 – 10 January 2011) was a Hungarian architect.

Hofer was born in Bozsok, Hungary. He undertook his undergraduate studies at the Budapest Technical University in 1954 and gained a master's degree in 1958. He worked for the Department of Public Works from 1955 and became a teacher at the university in 1973. He became president of the Hungarian Society of Architects in 1964, taking part in the planning of numerous towns and cities. He retired in 2001. Hofer died in Budapest on 10 January 2011.

== Main works ==
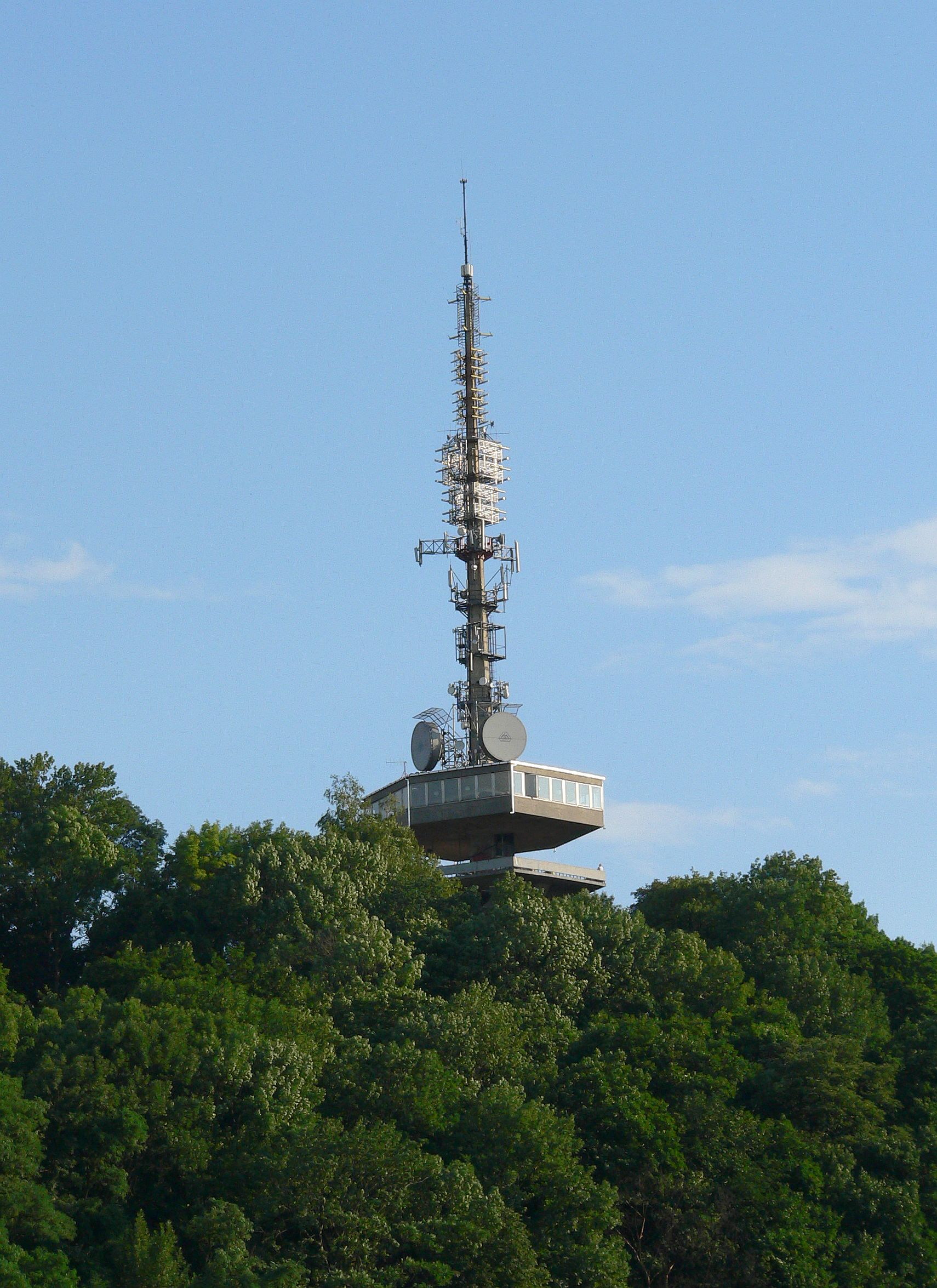
Miskolc Avas Tower

- Kazincbarcika, main square (1952)
- Miskolc, Avasi lookout and TV tower (1960)
- Gyöngyös, school (1959)
- Budapest, plan for National Theatre, 2nd prize (1966–1967)
- Szentendre, library and cultural centre (1968–1970)
- Győr, Transport college (1974)
- Budapest V., Roosevelt Square office building (demolished)
- Budapest, Water department head office (1969)
- Szentendre, Barcsay museum (1974)
- Szentmártonkáta, school (1983)

== Prizes ==
- Miklós Ybl Prize (1964)
- Pro Urbe Prize
- Széchenyi Prize (1998)
