= Péter Ágh =

Hungarian politician (born 1982)

Péter Ágh MP
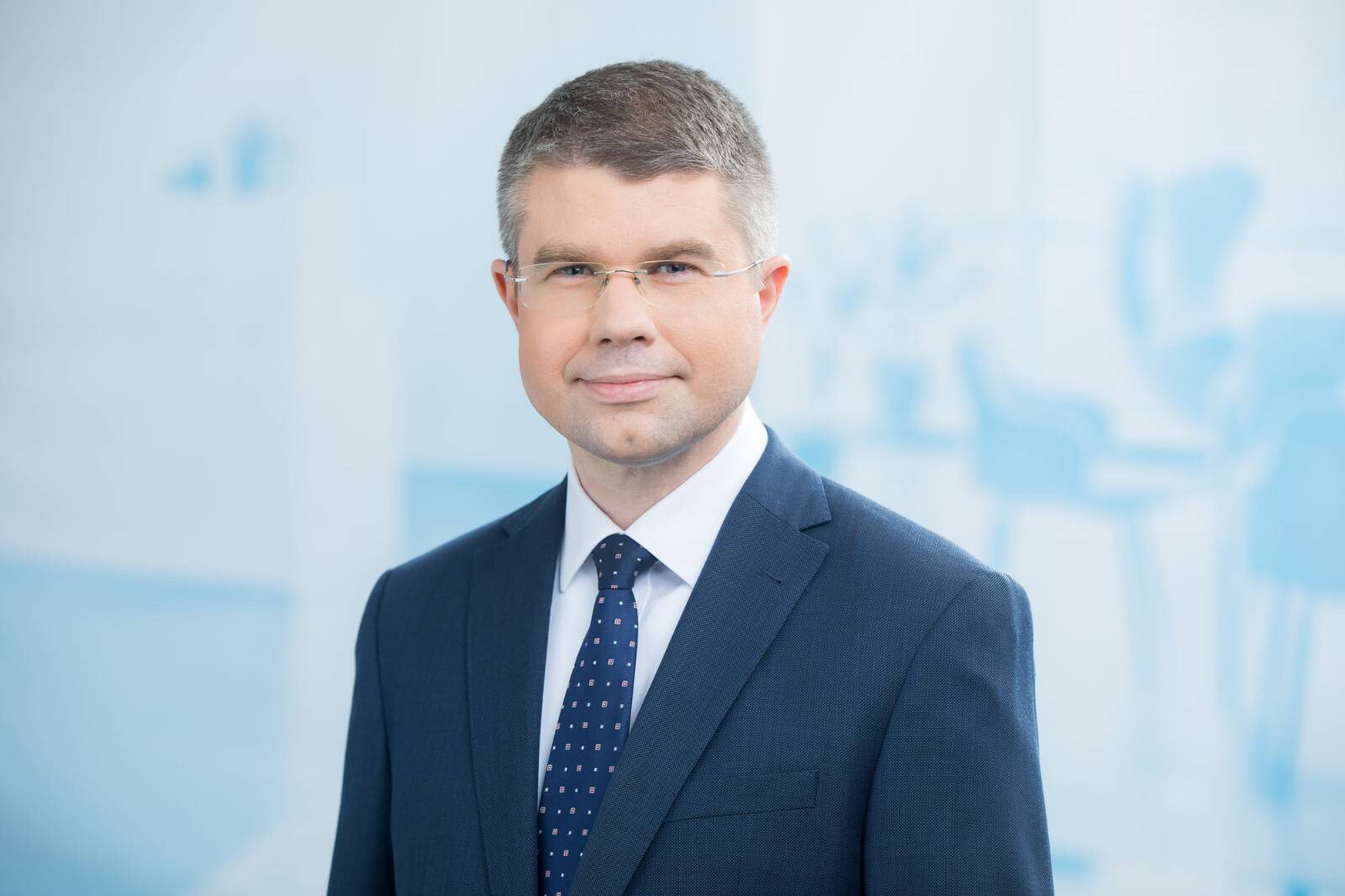

Member of the National Assembly
- Incumbent
- Assumed office 16 May 2006

Personal details
- Born: 30 January 1982 (age 44) Szombathely, Hungary
- Party: Fidesz
- Profession: politician

Péter Ágh (born 30 January 1982) is a Hungarian politician and member of the National Assembly (MP) State Secretary. Since 2014 he represents North-Vas County in the Parliament.

== Education, family ==
He graduated from the Premontrian St. Norbert Grammar School in Szombathely. He completed his university studies at Pázmány Péter Catholic University - Faculty of Humanities with two degrees. He obtained his third degree in further education at the Corvinus University of Budapest.

He is married and father of two children.

== Career ==
Member of Fidelitas from 1998, and Fidesz from 1999. Member of the national executive board of Fidelitas from 2003, executive vice-president from 2007 to 2009, and national president of the youth affiliate of Fidesz from 2009 to 2015. From 2011 to 2015 he was deputy leader of the Fidesz parliamentary group. Since 2013 he has been the constituency chairman of the individual constituency No. 02 of Vas county.

Between 2002 and 2014, he was a municipal representative of the county seat of Vas.He was elected as a Member of Parliament in 2006, and as the youngest member of the Fidesz faction, he also served as a notary of the Parliament. In 2006 he was elected to the National Assembly from a national list, in 2010 from a county list. Since 2014, he has been a Member of Parliament from an individual constituency. In Parliament, he has served on a number of professional bodies, including the legislative, defence, budget, youth, social affairs, family and housing committees.

Between 2015-2018 he was the Ministerial Commissioner for Development of Vas County of the Prime Minister's Office.

In the 2018 parliamentary elections, Péter Ágh won by the largest margin of victory when looking at the data for the whole country. Among the 106 single-member constituencies, the largest difference between the first and second place was in his favour in the individual constituency No 02 of Vas County. He had never before received as much support in a parliamentary election as in 2022, when he won 64.38% of the votes.

In 2022 he was appointed State Secretary of the Ministry of Construction and Transport. As a delegate of the Ministry, he became a member of the Budapest Agglomeration Development Council and the Central Danube Development Council.

He was awarded the first degree of the Honorary Award for National Defence in 2013.

== As a Member of the Parliament representing North Vas County ==
Since 2014, as a Member of Parliament for North Vas County, he has been committed to the development of the region. Together with Csaba Hende, he successfully lobbied for the government decisions needed to complete the M86 motorway between Szombathely and Győr. The project, which was completed in 2016, connected Vas County to the four-lane road system. In the field of transport development, the railway development connecting the towns of Szombathely-Kőszeg was another step forward, but the region also saw the electrification of the railway line to the capital, the renovation of railway stations and the introduction of Intercity trains to several towns. Major steps have also been taken to upgrade public roads in Répcelak, Vép, Bük and Csepreg. The list is extended to include Celldömölk, where he lobbied for the renovation of the road through the town. In the interest of Sárvár, he successfully lobbied in the interest of Sárvár - among other things - for the government's redemption of the Sárvár spa loan, which posed a serious threat due to the coronavirus, and for the necessary financial support for the construction of the new sports and cultural centre, the Sárvár Arena. In Kőszeg, he has also successfully worked for the renovation of several churches and monuments, the construction of a new fire and ambulance station, the creation of a new public cemetery, and the renovation of the Jurisics Grammar School. Through his interventions, Kőszeg, one of the smallest taxpaying towns in Vas County, received billions of euros in government funding for a road rehabilitation programme that it would not have been able to undertake on its own. In Celldömölk, in addition to the above-mentioned road reconstruction, his work also brought visible results in the renovation of the Benedictine monastery and the Berzsenyi Grammar School, the railway station, the new district centre and institutional renovations. In the smaller settlements in his constituency, medical clinics, nurseries, kindergartens, schools, offices, church and municipal community spaces, churches have been restored through the Government's Hungarian Village Programme. He has also spoken several times in Parliament in support of this programme.

He was the most active speaker of Vas county in the National Assembly between 2018-2022.

He initiated the creation of the Bük-Sárvár tourist region, which covers his constituency, North Vas County, from Kőszeg to Celldömölk, and was established by a government decree.

In 2014, he also proposed a law declaring the settlements that remained annexed to Hungary after the First World War as villages of loyalty, including Ólmod, in his constituency.

In 2021, the Csepreg City Council intended to award him an honorary citizenship in recognition of his services for the city which he refused by saying that the greatest recognition of his work was the trust of the people. In his reply to the mayor, he said that as long as he was an elected member of parliament for the district, he could not accept their honourable nomination.

Party political offices
Preceded by Péter Szijjártó	President of Fidelitas; 2009–2015	Succeeded by László Böröcz
