= Takács de Saár =

Hungarian noble family

Takács de Saár (in Hungarian: saári Takács) is a Hungarian noble family. The family members mainly lived in Vas and Sopron counties and had their seat in Saár village, which since 1912 is a district of Sárvár. The family's nobility was confirmed in 1646 by King Ferdinand III.

== Coat of arms ==
A red triangle on the shield. In the middle of the triangle a crescent. Above the triangle in a blue field two shining stars. On the helmet a Hungarian warrior wielding a sabre.

== Notable family members ==
- Miklós Takács de Saár, forestry specialist, Social Democratic politician
