= Miklós Takács =

Hungarian politician

Miklós Antal Imre Takács de Saár (Szombathely, Hungary, 1906 – Szombathely, 1967) was a Hungarian silviculturist and Social Democratic politician. He was a member of the Takács de Saár family.

Takács studied at the Academy of Forestry in Győr and after his graduation worked as forest inspector first in Csepreg, then in Kőszegpaty, Nemescsó, Pusztacsó and Benkeháza. Between the world wars he published a number of articles and essays on forestry and beekeeping in Hungarian and German periodicals.

In 1945, when Ferenc Szálasi's government had its headquarters around Kőszeg, Takács managed to save the lives of many Jews and prisoners of war.

Upon the end of World War II, Takács became a member of the Hungarian Social Democratic Party and took part in elaboration of the agrarian reform in Hungary. In 1948 due to his commitment to democracy and rule of law Miklós Takács (along with Anna Kéthly) was expelled from the Social Democratic Party which was under pressure to form a union with the Communists, an option strongly opposed by Takács and other right-wing Social Democrats. During the 1950s he was several times arrested and tortured by the State Protection Authority. During the 1956 revolution Takács took part in the reorganization of the independent Social Democratic Party, for which he was arrested after the fall of the revolution.

Takács died in 1967 in his town of birth.

== Sources ==
- Népszava
- Kőszeg és Vidéke
