= Kőszegszerdahely =

- Location of Vas county in Hungary

- Location of Kőszegszerdahely
- Coordinates: 47.33982°N 16.51668°E
- Country: Hungary
- County: Vas

Area
  - Total: 7.37 km^{2} (2.85 sq mi)

Population (2004)
  - Total: 507
  - Density: 68.79/km^{2} (178.2/sq mi)
- Time zone: UTC+1 (CET)
  - Summer (DST): UTC+2 (CEST)
- Postal code: 9725
- Area code: 94

Kőszegszerdahely is a village in Vas county, in the district of Kőszeg, 5 km-s from the Hungarian-Austrian border (Bozsok-Rohonc border crossing).

== Location ==
Kőszegszerdahely is located in western Hungary. Neighboring settlements: Bozsok, Velem, Cák, Kőszegdoroszló and Perenye.

== Transport ==
=== Roads ===
The village is the center of the local road network of Kőszeghegyalja (Kőszeg Foothills), which is connected to the Szombathely-Kőszeg secondary main road (Main Road 87).

=== Distance from airports ===
Country	Capital/Other settlement	Distance (km)	Airport	Distance (km)	Time
Distance from certain capital and their airports:
Slovakia	Bratislava	136	Airport Bratislava	146	2 h 54 m
Hungary	Budapest	238	Liszt Ferenc Nk. Repülőtér	257	4 h 31 m
Croatia	Zagreb	210	Zračna luka Zagreb	236	3 h 49 m
Slovenian	Ljubljana	283	Aerodom Ljubljana	285	4 h 24 m
Austria	Wien	118	Flughafen Wien-Schwechat	119	2 h 30 m
Distance from other airports:
Hungary	Győr	103	Győr-Pér	130	2 h 37 m
Hungary	Sármellék	102	Hévíz-Balaton Airport	114	2 h 45 m
Austria	Graz	107	Flughafen Graz	110	1 h 47 m

== History ==
There was a market place in the place of the village already before the Mongol invasion. In the Middle Ages, villages belonged to a castle or a lordship.

Year(s)	Castle or lordship where it be longed	Squire(s)	Event	Antecedent	Hungarian King
1279	Saint Vid Castle	Kőszegi (earlier: Németújvári), Miklós	Sharing on estate	Death of Henrik Kőszegi (earlier: Németújvári) in 1274	IV. László (Arpad dynasty)
after 1291	Lordship of Rohonc		Destruction of Saint Vid Castle	The peace treaty of Hainburg in 1291 austrian Duke Albrecht I and hungarian King András III	III. András (Arpad dynasty)
1374	Lordship of Rohonc	Rohonci family (descendants of Miklós Németújvári)			I. Lajos (Anjou)
1404	Lordship of Rohonc	Garai family	Grant	László Nápolyi's performance and expulsion from the country in 1402-1403	Zsigmond (Luxemburg dynasty)
1445		I. Frigyes German emperor occupied Kőszeg and Rohonc	German Occupation	Hungarian defeat against the Turks in the Battle of Varna in 1444	V. László (Habsburg)
1477	Lordship of Rohonc	Pesnitzer, Ulrik	King Matthias's Austrian campaign	Habsburg-Jagello Alliance against Hungarian King. (1476)	I. Mátyás (Hunyadi)
after 1477	Bozsok and Szerdahely	Bornemissza, János	Grant	The removal of Bozsok and Szerdahely from the lordship of Rohonc	I. Mátyás (Hunyadi)
from 1526	Bozsok and Szerdahely	Sibrik family	Grant	Death of János Bornemissza (1526, Castle of Bratislava)	I. Ferdinand (Habsburg)
1616-1848	partly Bozsok and Szerdahely	Sibrik family			
1616-1848	partly lordship of Rohonc	Batthyány family	Purchase	Gábor Sibrik in Turkish captivity	II. Mátyás (Habsburg)

In 1532, Turkish troops besieging Kőszeg together with the other villages in the area burned down Kőszegszerdahely. The inhabitants of the villages fled to the Castle of Kőszeg and, together with the citizens of Kőszeg, led by Captain Miklós Jurisich, stopped the Turks.

== Sights ==
=== All Saints Church ===
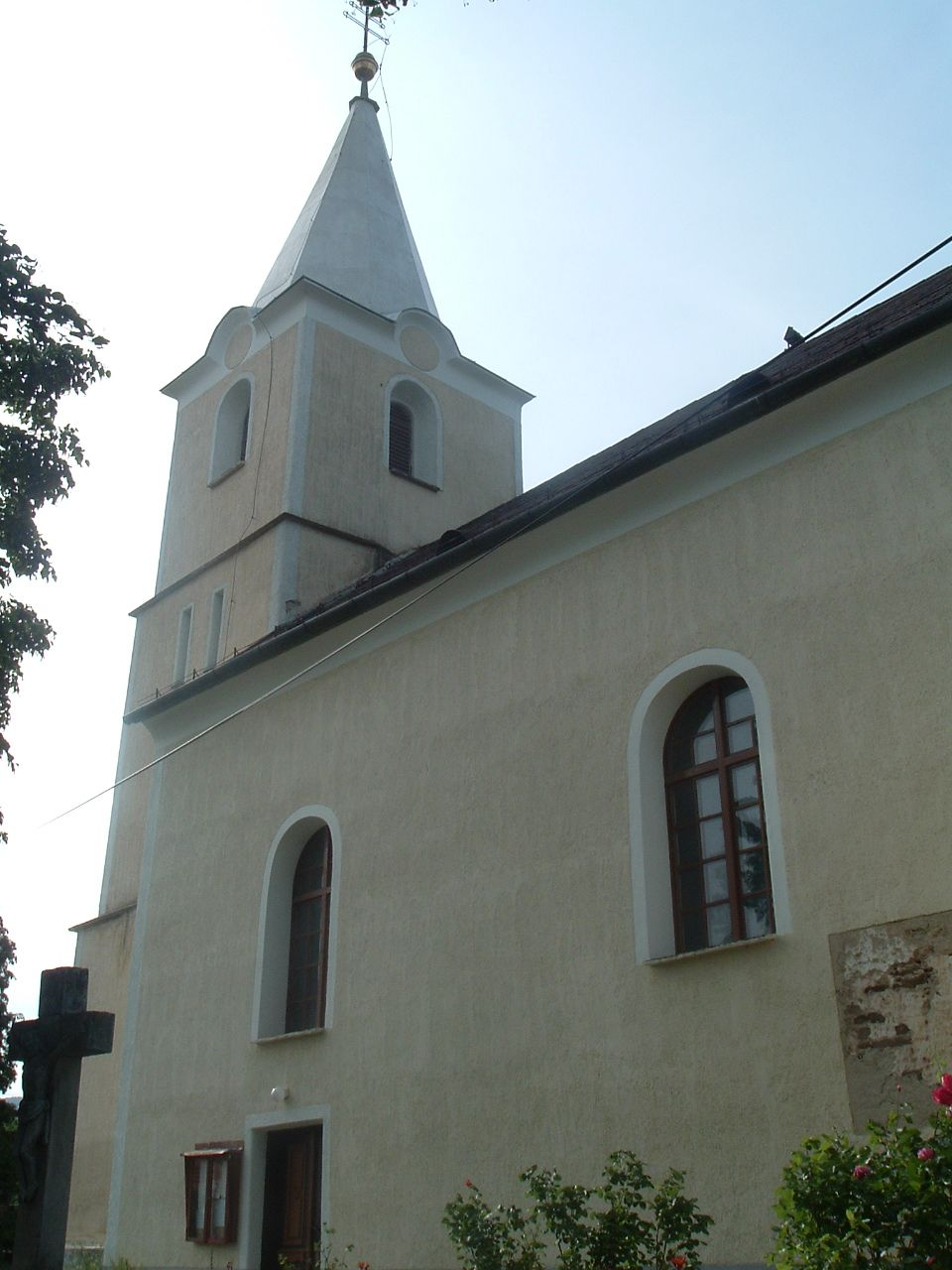
All Saints Church

=== Ethnographic Exhibition ===
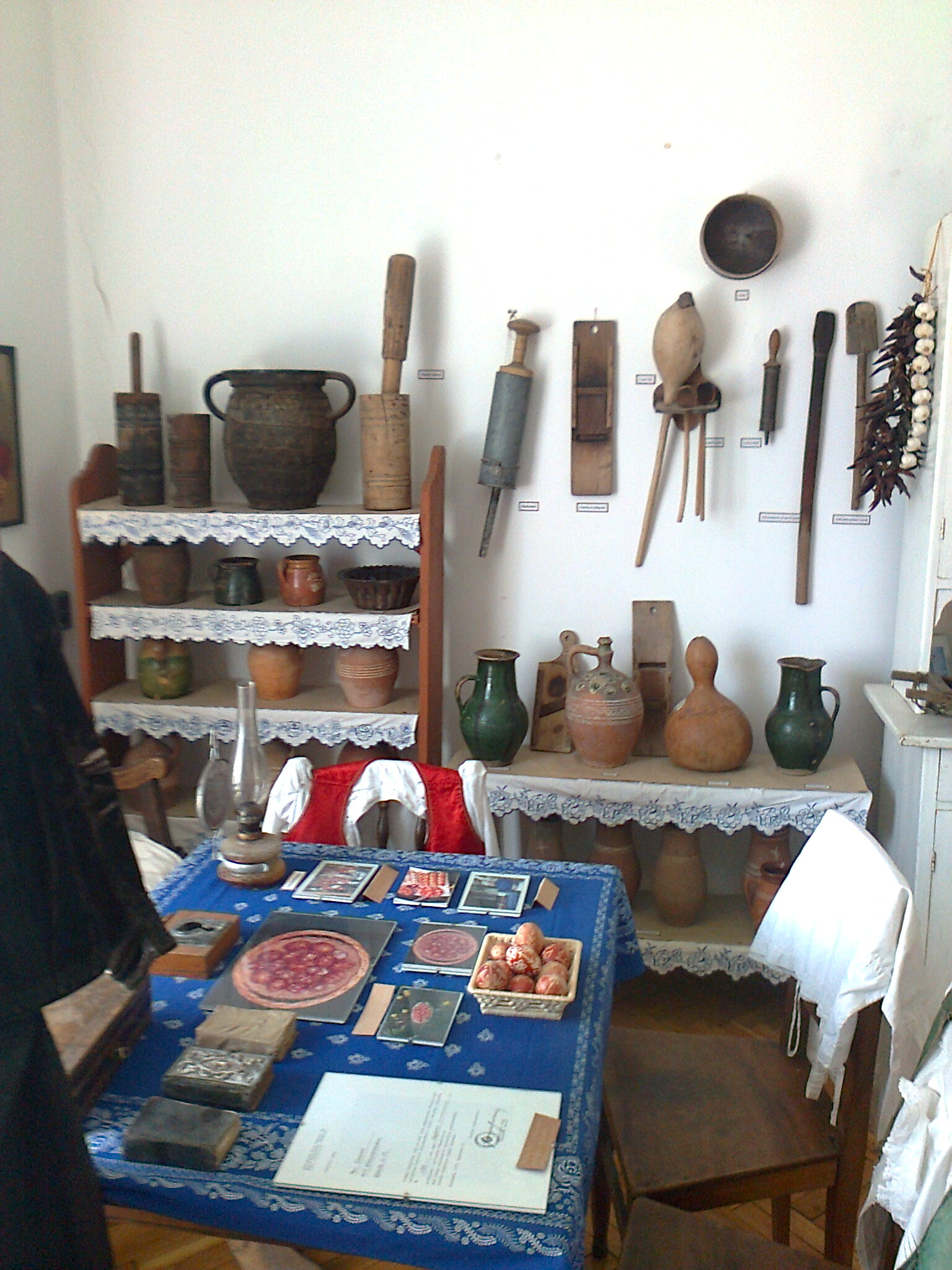
A part of the Ethnographic Exhibition.

=== Ereszténymajor ===
Here is a 120 years old Cedrus atlantica.

== Famous people ==
- Lakner, Tamás. Conductor, guitarist, music teacher, leader of the Szélkiáltó band.
- Seregély, István. Archbishop. From 1974 to 1981 was priest in Kőszegszerdahely.
- Jagodics, Zoltán. Five times a member of the Hungary national football team.
