= Lócs =

Lócs Loča (in Croatian) Losing (in German)
- Village
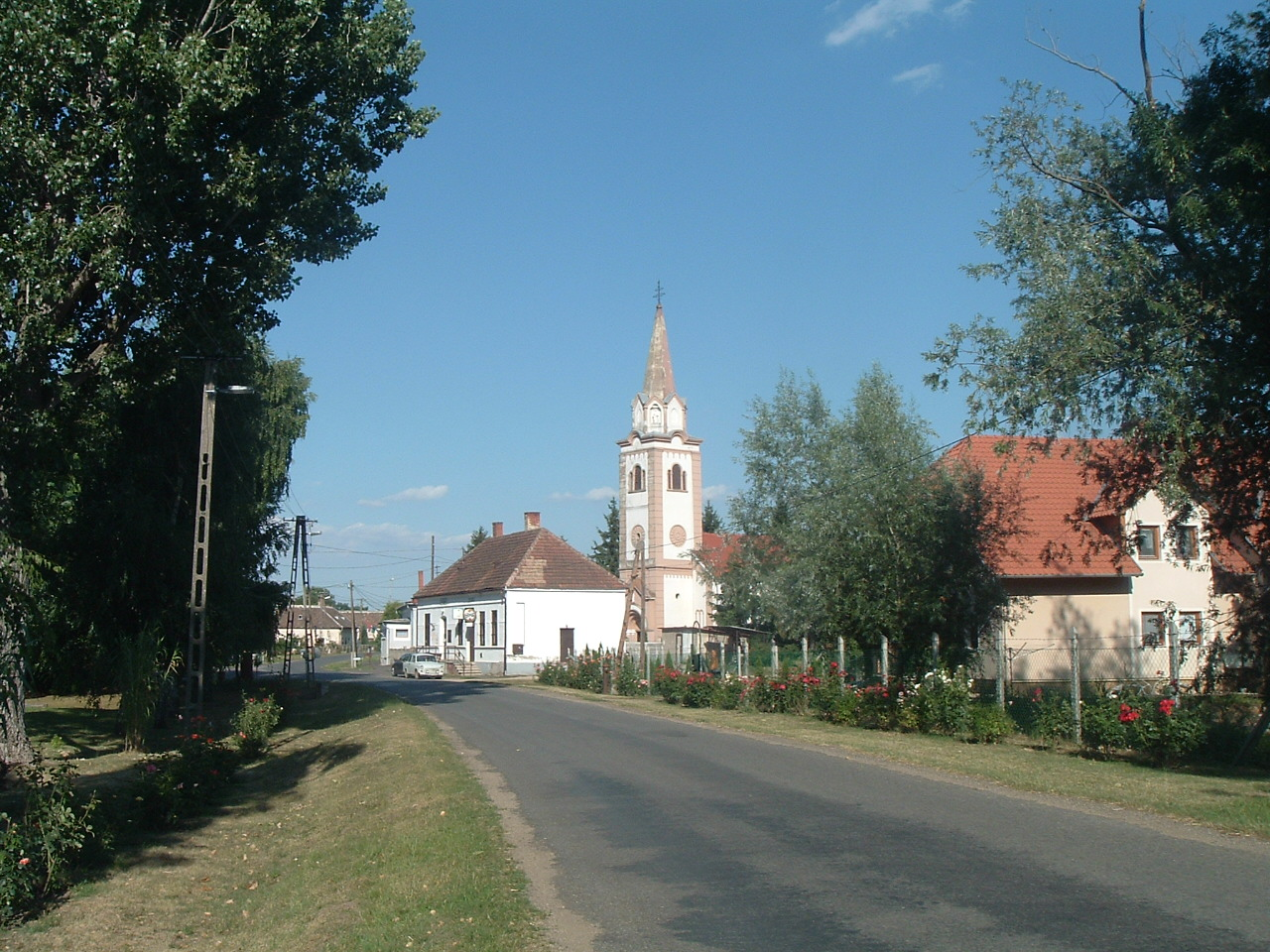

- Flag Coat of arms

- Location of Lócs
- Coordinates: 47.403611°N 16.813889°E
- Country: Hungary
- Region: Western Transdanubia
- County: Vas
- District: Kőszeg

Area
  - Total: 5.13 km^{2} (1.98 sq mi)

Population (1 January 2026)
  - Total: 148
  - Density: 28.8/km^{2} (74.7/sq mi)
- Time zone: UTC+1 (CET)
  - Summer (DST): UTC+2 (CEST)
- Postal code: 9634
- Area code: (+36) 94
- Website: www.locs.hu

Lócs is a village in Vas county, Hungary.
