= Nyőgér =

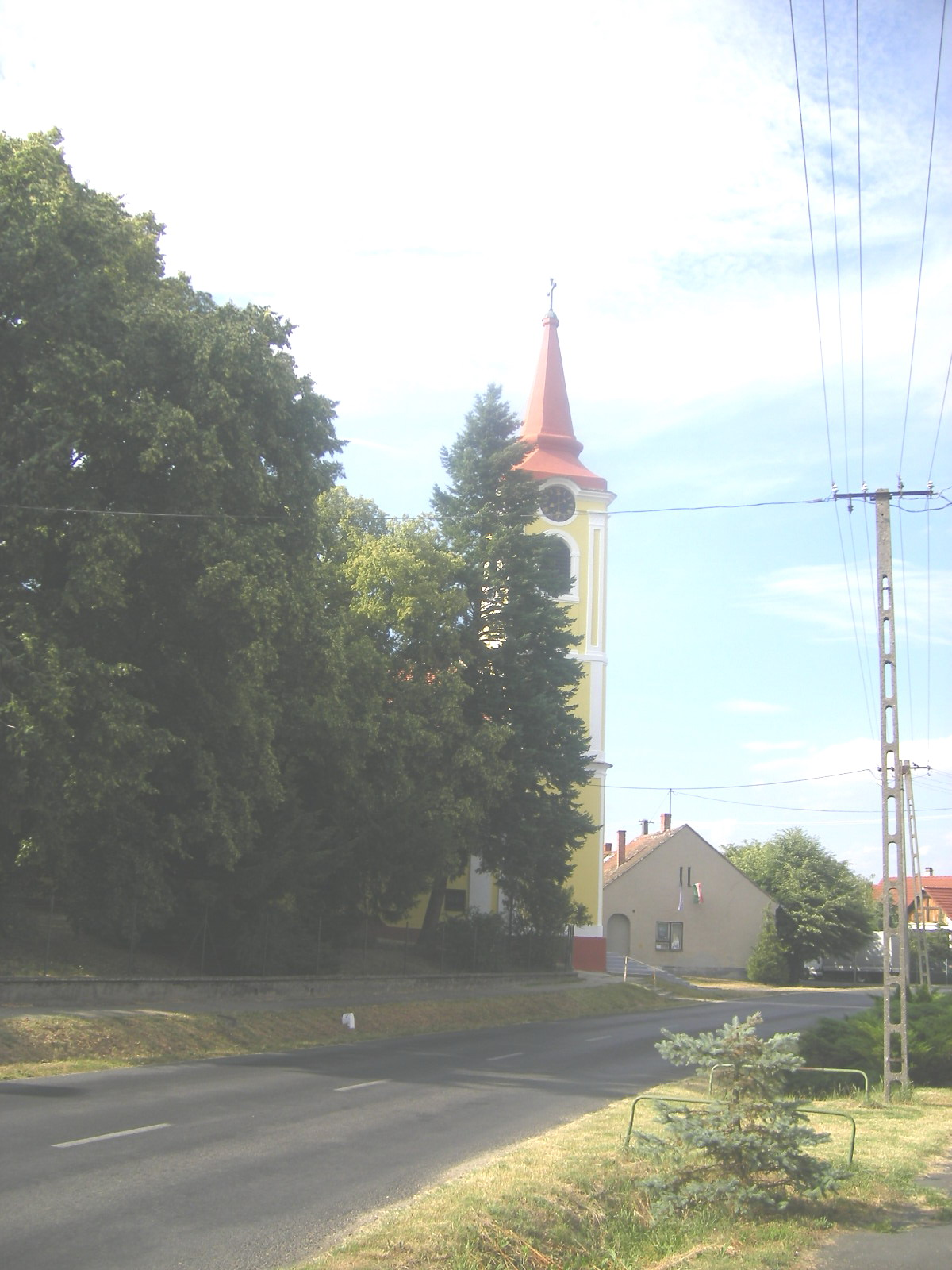
- Nyőgér

- Location of Nyőgér in Hungary
- Coordinates: 47°10′51.60″N 16°56′4.06″E
- Country: Hungary
- Region: Western Transdanubia
- County: Vas
- Subregion: Sárvári
- Rank: Village

Area
  - Total: 10.73 km^{2} (4.14 sq mi)
- Time zone: UTC+1 (CET)
  - Summer (DST): UTC+2 (CEST)
- Postal code: 9682
- Area code: +36 95
- Website: www.nyoger.hu

Nyőgér is a village in Vas county, Hungary.
