= Ólmod =

Ólmod Plajgor (in Croatian) Bleigraben (in German)
- Village
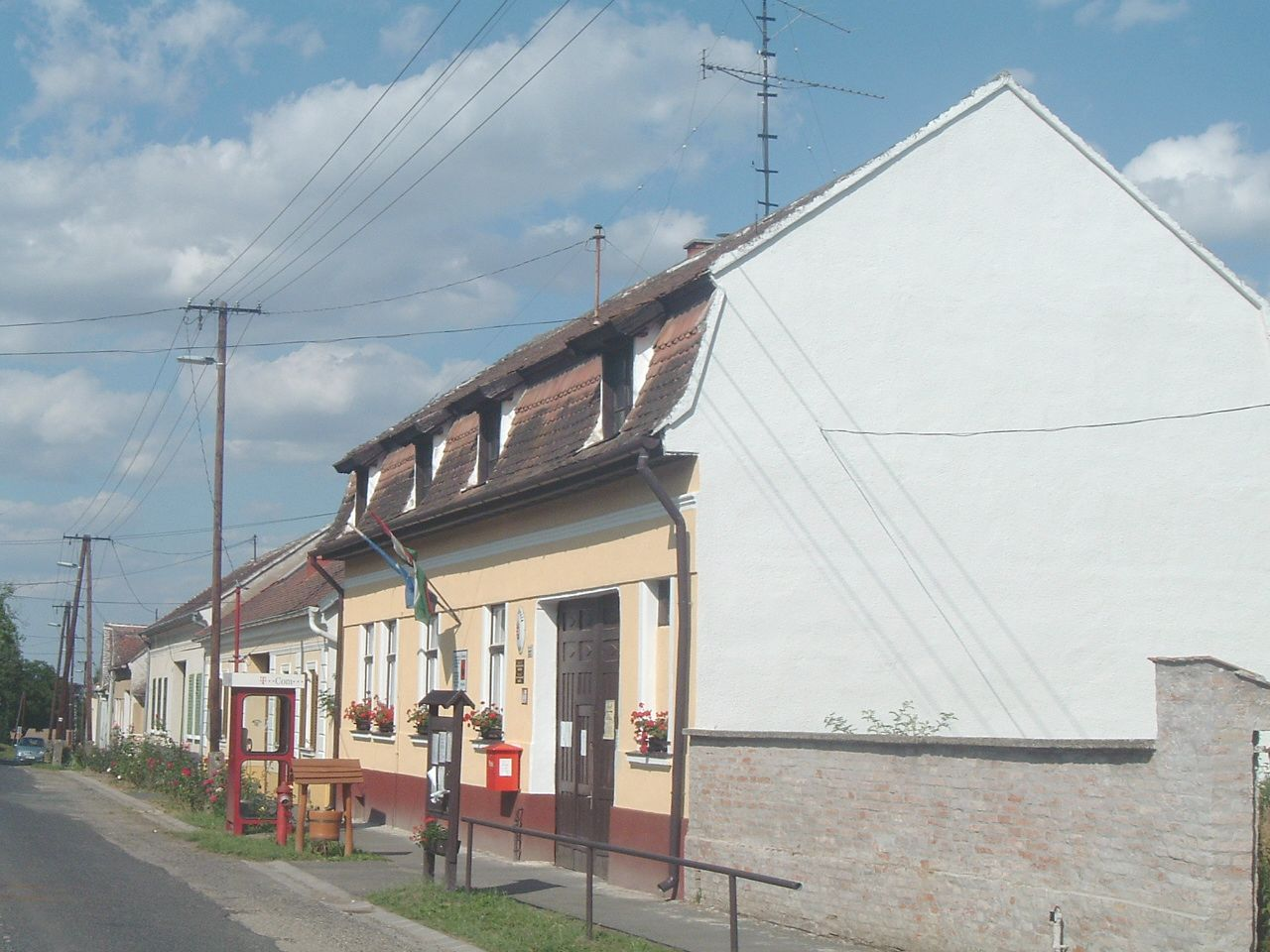

- Flag Coat of arms

- Location of Ólmod
- Coordinates: 47.415°N 16.589722°E
- Country: Hungary
- Region: Western Transdanubia
- County: Vas
- District: Kőszeg

Area
  - Total: 3.66 km^{2} (1.41 sq mi)

Population (1 January 2026)
  - Total: 103
  - Density: 28.1/km^{2} (72.9/sq mi)
- Time zone: UTC+1 (CET)
  - Summer (DST): UTC+2 (CEST)
- Postal code: 9733
- Area code: (+36) 94

Ólmod is a village in Vas county, Hungary.
