= Iklanberény =

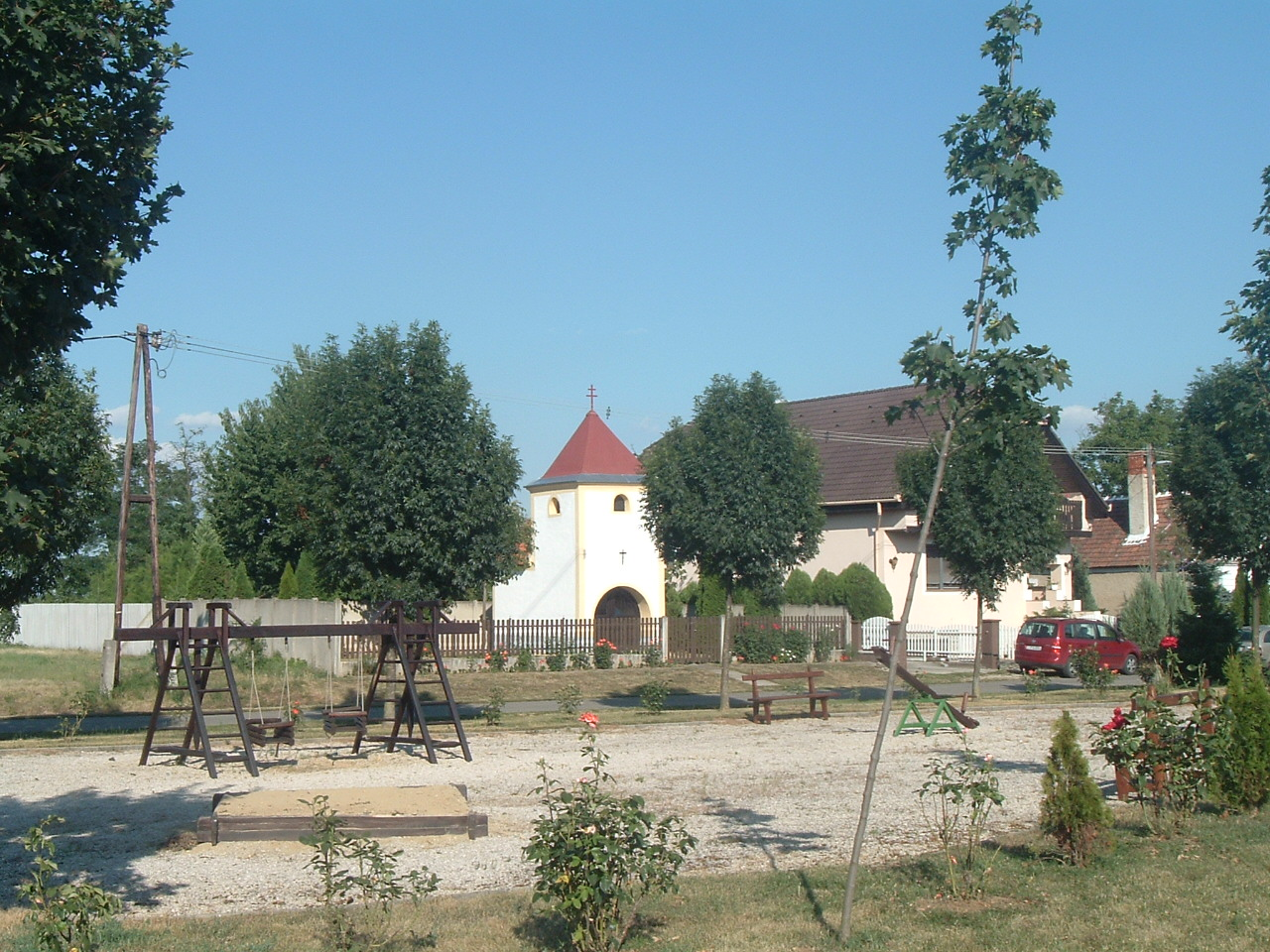

- Coat of arms

- Location of Iklanberény in Hungary
- Coordinates: 47°25′31″N 16°48′14″E
- Country: Hungary
- Region: Western Transdanubia
- County: Vas
- Subregion: Csepregi
- Rank: Village

Area
  - Total: 2.96 km^{2} (1.14 sq mi)

Population (1 January 2008)
  - Total: 29
  - Density: 9.8/km^{2} (25/sq mi)
- Time zone: UTC+1 (CET)
  - Summer (DST): UTC+2 (CEST)
- Postal code: 9634
- Area code: +36 94
- KSH code: 29504

Iklanberény is a village in Vas county, Hungary.
