= Tormásliget =

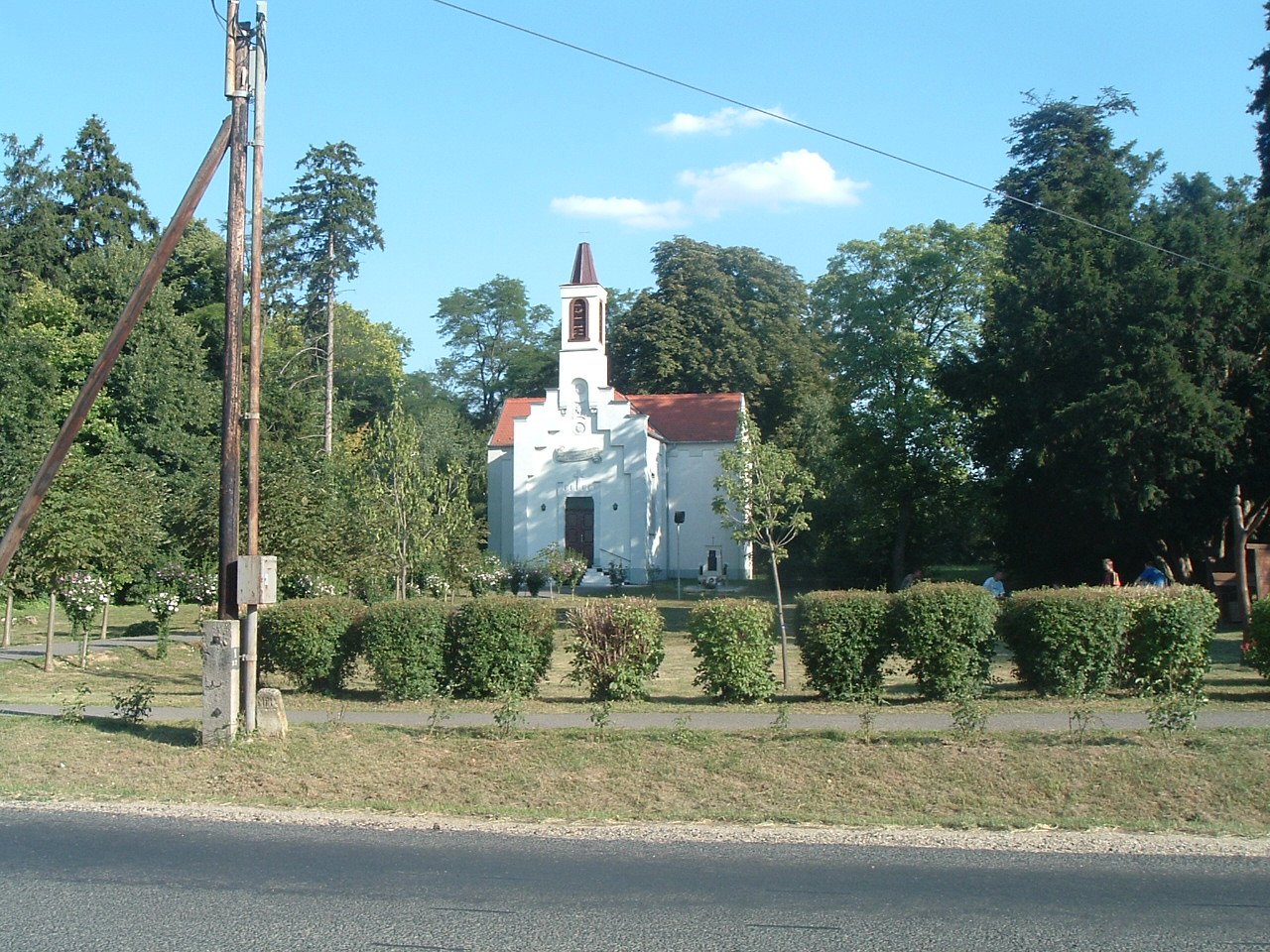

- Location of Tormásliget in Hungary
- Coordinates: 47°25′42.56″N 16°46′38.35″E
- Country: Hungary
- Region: Western Transdanubia
- County: Vas
- Subregion: Csepregi
- Rank: Village

Area
  - Total: 7.53 km^{2} (2.91 sq mi)

Population (1 January 2008)
  - Total: 344
  - Density: 45.7/km^{2} (118/sq mi)
- Time zone: UTC+1 (CET)
  - Summer (DST): UTC+2 (CEST)
- Postal code: 9736
- Area code: +36 94
- KSH code: 34087
- Website: https://tormasliget.hu/

Tormásliget is a village in Vas county, Hungary.
