= Kiszsidány =

Kiszsidány Roggendorf
- Village
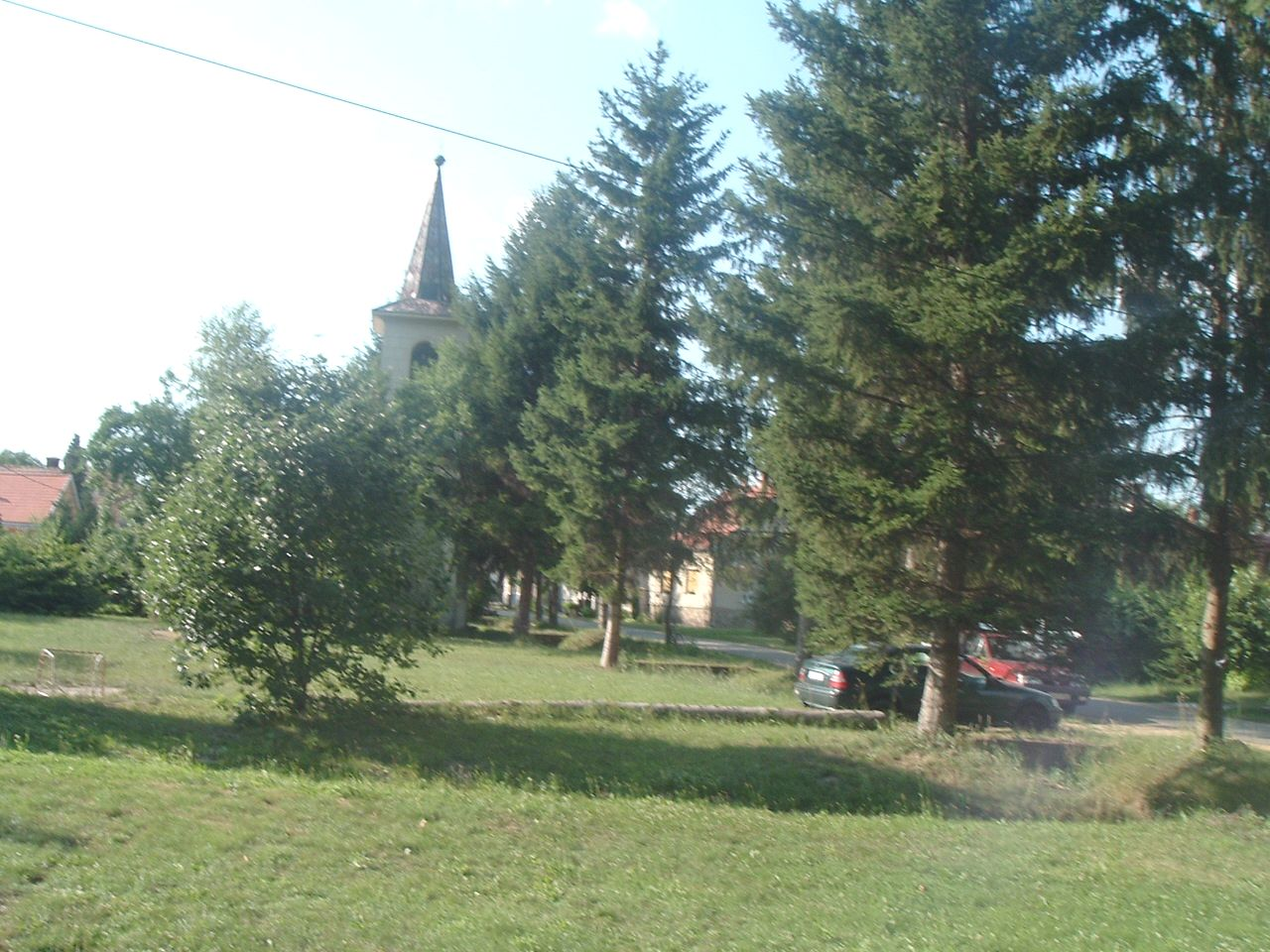

- Coat of arms

- Location of Kiszsidány in Hungary
- Coordinates: 47°24′36″N 16°38′22″E
- Country: Hungary
- Region: Western Transdanubia
- County: Vas
- Subregion: Kőszegi
- Rank: Village

Area
  - Total: 4.93 km^{2} (1.90 sq mi)

Population (1 January 2008)
  - Total: 96
  - Density: 19/km^{2} (50/sq mi)
- Time zone: UTC+1 (CET)
  - Summer (DST): UTC+2 (CEST)
- Postal code: 9733
- Area code: +36 94
- KSH code: 15486

Kiszsidány (German: Roggendorf) is a village in Vas County, Hungary.
