= Nemescsó =

- Location of Nemescsó in Hungary
- Coordinates: 47°20′58″N 16°36′57″E
- Country: Hungary
- Region: Western Transdanubia
- County: Vas
- Subregion: Kőszegi
- Rank: Village

Area
  - Total: 7.38 km^{2} (2.85 sq mi)

Population (1 January 2008)
  - Total: 324
  - Density: 43.9/km^{2} (114/sq mi)
- Time zone: UTC+1 (CET)
  - Summer (DST): UTC+2 (CEST)
- Postal code: 9739
- Area code: +36 94
- KSH code: 23320
- Website: https://nemescso.hu/

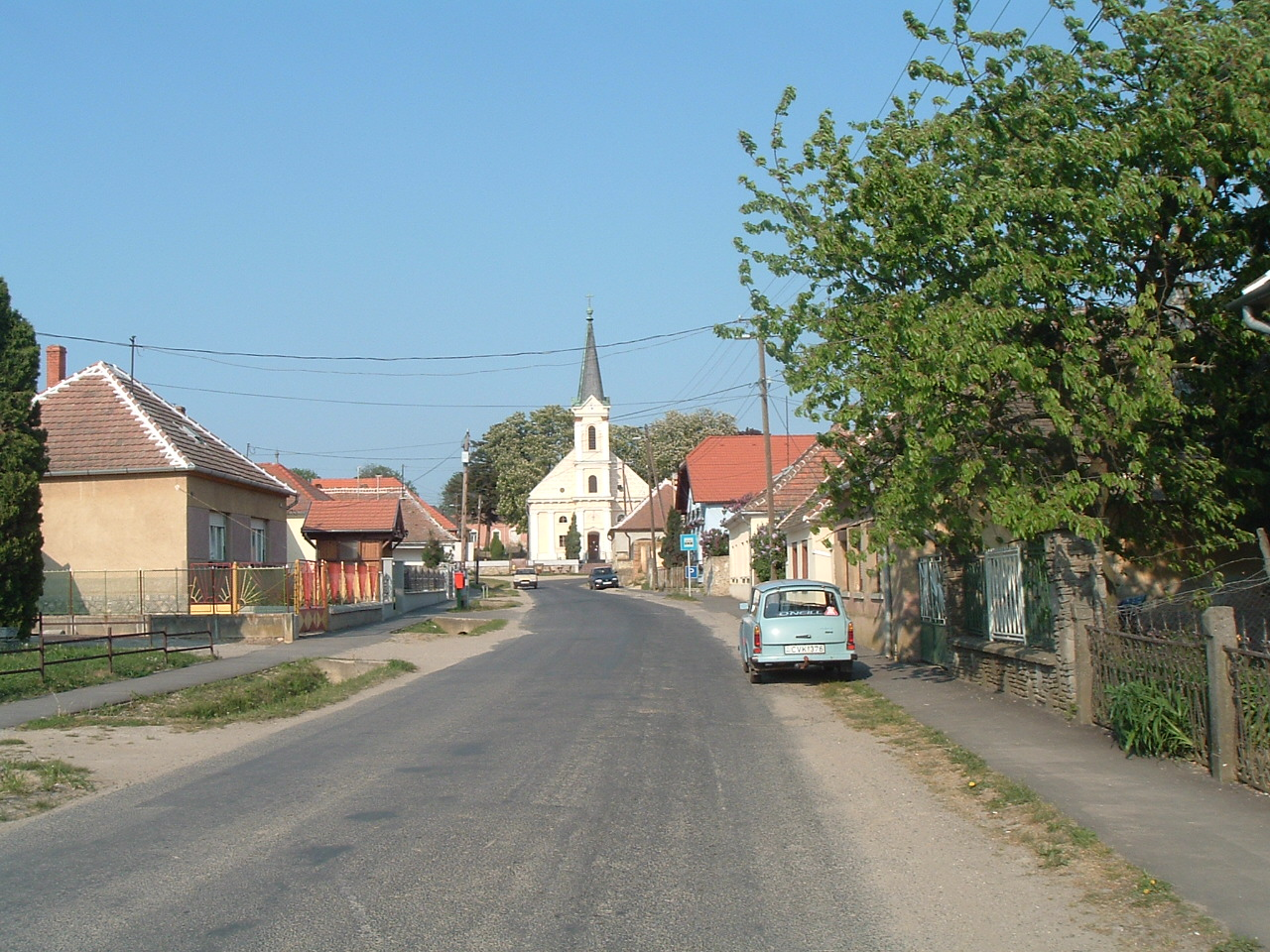
Nemescsó's Main Street

Nemescsó (German: Tschobing, Croatian and Slovene: Čobin) is a village in Vas county, Hungary.

== Notable people ==
- Miklós Takács de Saár, silviculturist, politician
