= Salköveskút =

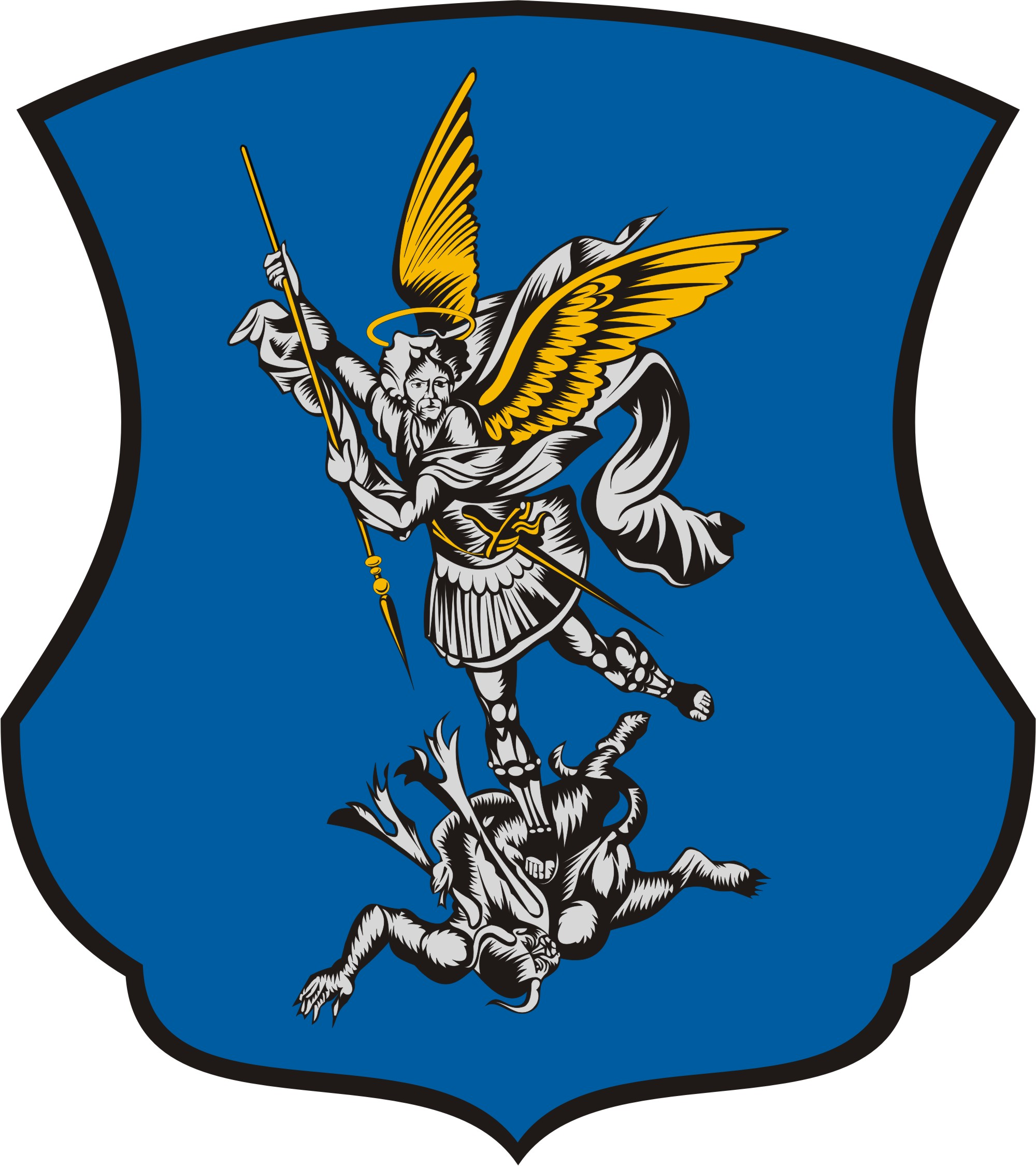
- Coat of arms

- Location of Salköveskút in Hungary
- Coordinates: 47°17′40″N 16°41′42″E
- Country: Hungary
- Region: Western Transdanubia
- County: Vas
- Subregion: Szombathelyi
- Rank: Village

Area
  - Total: 13.20 km^{2} (5.10 sq mi)

Population (1 January 2008)
  - Total: 511
  - Density: 38.7/km^{2} (100/sq mi)
- Time zone: UTC+1 (CET)
  - Summer (DST): UTC+2 (CEST)
- Postal code: 9742
- Area code: +36 94
- KSH code: 18883
- Website: www.salkoveskut.hu

Salköveskút is a village in Vas county, Hungary.
