= Bozsok =

Bozsok Božok (in Croatian) Poschendorf (in German)
- Village
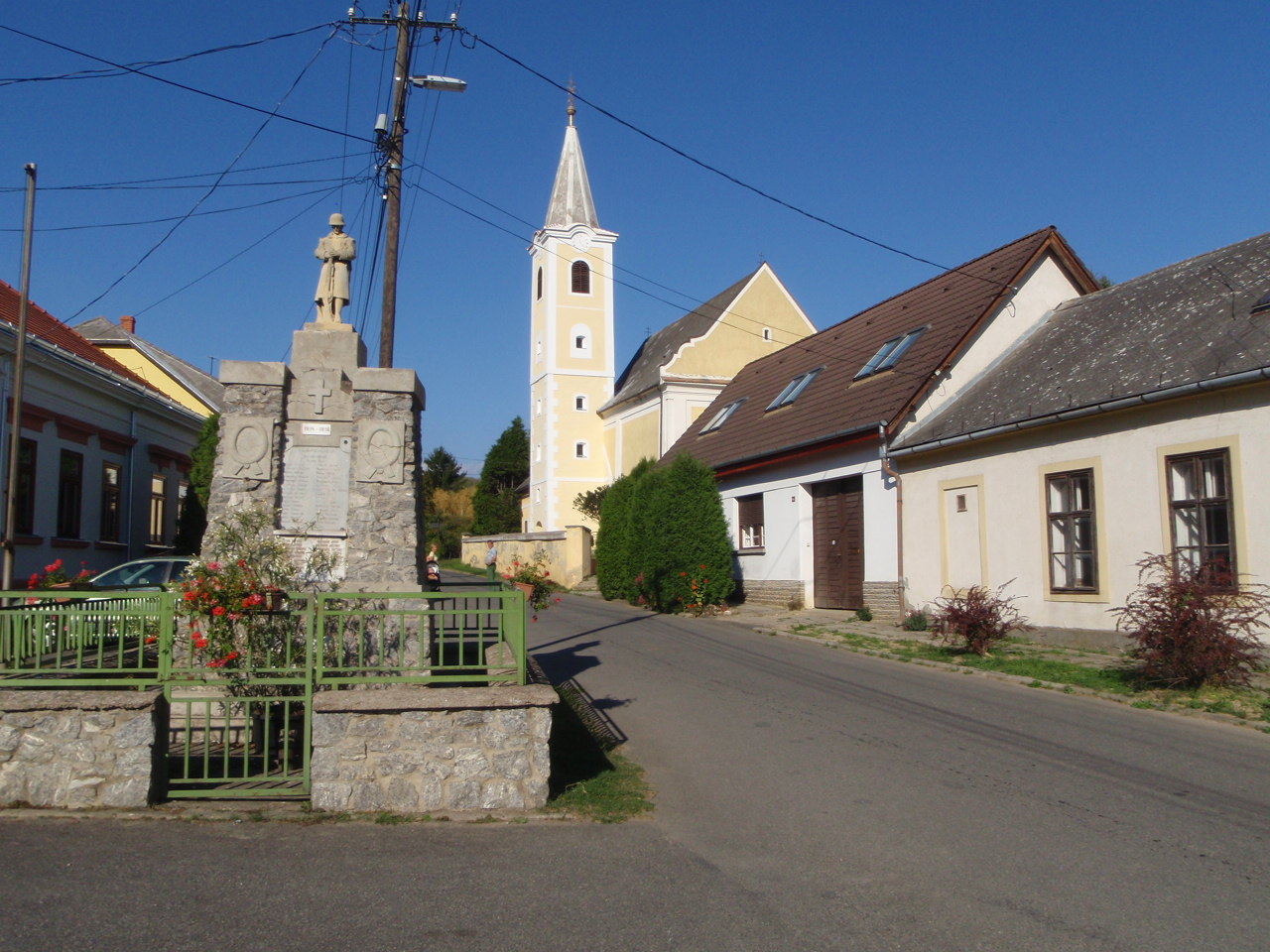
- Church of Saint Anne

- Flag Coat of arms

- Location of Bozsok
- Coordinates: 47.32476°N 16.49042°E
- Country: Hungary
- Region: Western Transdanubia
- County: Vas
- District: Kőszeg

Area
  - Total: 20.91 km^{2} (8.07 sq mi)

Population (1 January 2025)
  - Total: 359
  - Density: 17.2/km^{2} (44.5/sq mi)
- Time zone: UTC+1 (CET)
  - Summer (DST): UTC+2 (CEST)
- Postal code: 9727
- Area code: (+36) 94
- Website: www.bozsok.hu

Bozsok (German: Poschendorf) is a village in Vas County, Hungary. It is mentioned in some records from the 13th century. It is near the remains of some Roman water pipes. It lies at the foot of the Kőszeg Mountains on the border with Austria, having Rechnitz on the other side. One of the attractions of Bozsok is Sibrik Castle.

== Famous people ==
The architect Miklós Hofer was born in Bozsok in 1931.
