= Vasasszonyfa =

- Location of Vas county in Hungary

- Location of Vasasszonyfa
- Coordinates: 47.31305°N 16.67033°E
- Country: Hungary
- County: Vas

Area
  - Total: 10.65 km^{2} (4.11 sq mi)

Population (2004)
  - Total: 385
  - Density: 36.15/km^{2} (93.6/sq mi)
- Time zone: UTC+1 (CET)
  - Summer (DST): UTC+2 (CEST)
- Postal code: 9744
- Area code: 94

Vasasszonyfa is a village in Vas county, Hungary.
