= Lukácsháza =

- Coat of arms

- Location of Lukácsháza in Hungary
- Coordinates: 47°20′01″N 16°34′50″E
- Country: Hungary
- Region: Western Transdanubia
- County: Vas
- Subregion: Kőszegi
- Rank: Village

Area
  - Total: 9.36 km^{2} (3.61 sq mi)

Population (1 January 2008)
  - Total: 1,089
  - Density: 116/km^{2} (301/sq mi)
- Time zone: UTC+1 (CET)
  - Summer (DST): UTC+2 (CEST)
- Postal code: 9724
- Area code: +36 94
- KSH code: 14021
- Website: http://www.lukacshaza.hu/

Lukácsháza is a village in Vas county, Hungary.
