= Pusztacsó =

- Location of Pusztacsó in Hungary
- Coordinates: 47°19′58″N 16°37′17″E
- Country: Hungary
- Region: Western Transdanubia
- County: Vas
- Subregion: Kőszegi
- Rank: Village

Area
  - Total: 7.26 km^{2} (2.80 sq mi)

Population (1 January 2008)
  - Total: 171
  - Density: 23.6/km^{2} (61.0/sq mi)
- Time zone: UTC+1 (CET)
  - Summer (DST): UTC+2 (CEST)
- Postal code: 9739
- Area code: +36 94
- KSH code: 10311

Pusztacsó is a village in Vas county, Hungary.

== Notable people ==
- Miklós Takács de Saár, silviculturist, politician
