= Csepreg =

Place in Vas, Hungary

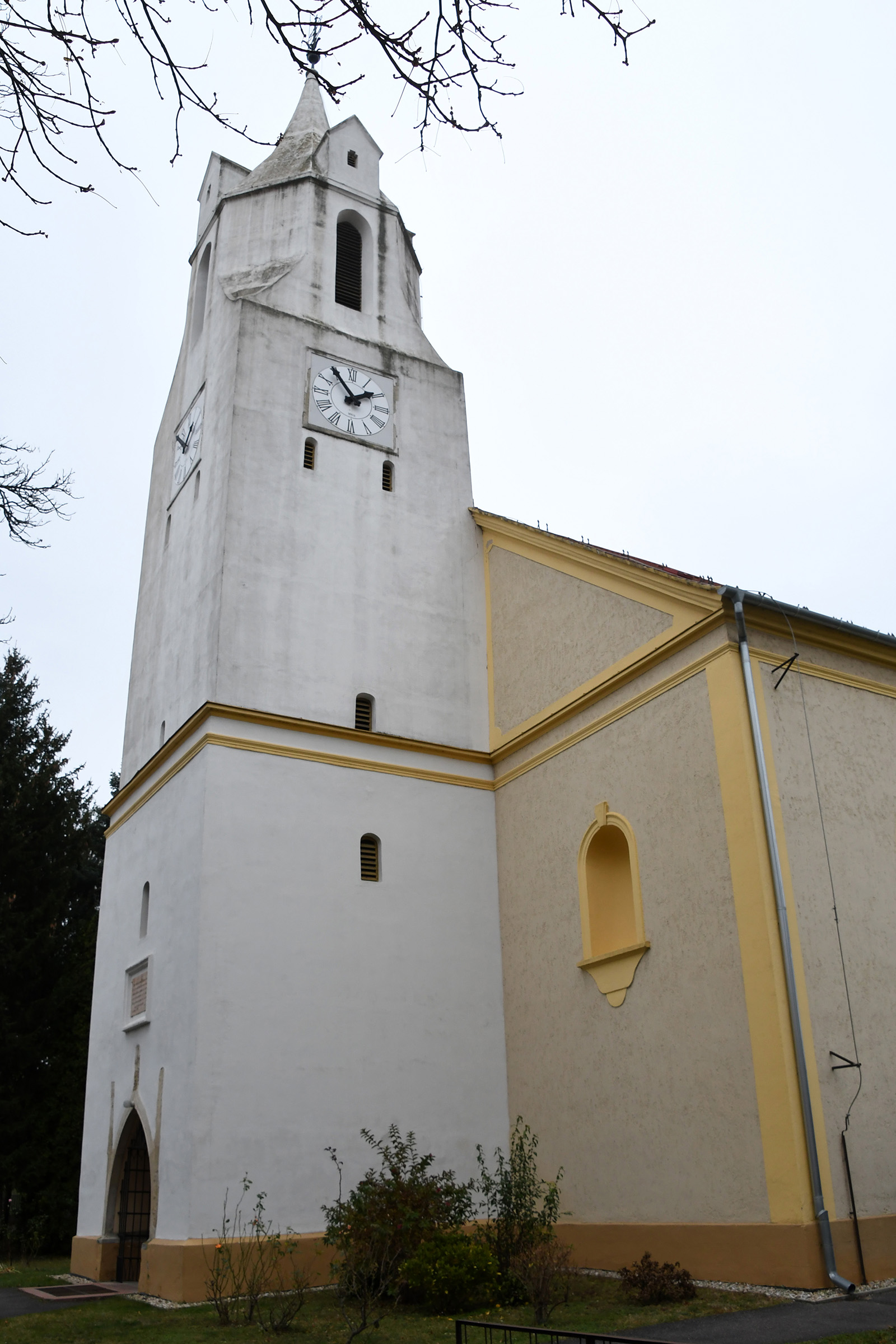

- Flag Coat of arms

- Location of Vas county in Hungary

- Location of Csepreg
- Coordinates: 47.40022°N 16.70592°E
- Country: Hungary
- County: Vas

Government
  - Mayor: Zoltán Horváth

Area
  - Total: 49.54 km^{2} (19.13 sq mi)

Population (2015)
  - Total: 3,241
  - Density: 65.42/km^{2} (169.4/sq mi)
- Time zone: UTC+1 (CET)
  - Summer (DST): UTC+2 (CEST)
- Postal code: 9735
- Area code: 94

Csepreg (German: Schapring; Croatian: Čepreg) is a town in Vas County, Hungary. It is the largest town on the Répce River. The current mayor of the town is Zoltán Horváth, elected on November 13, 2019.

Although tourism, particularly camping and fishing, are important sources of income for the town, a plan for the establishment of a metal finishing factory was accepted by the council after the first plan had been rejected.

== Education ==
- The town has a nursery, a kindergarten, an elementary school, a music school and a secondary school( Nádasdy Tamás Economic and IT Secondary School).
- The town library has a significant collection.

== Notable people ==
- Miklós Takács de Saár, silviculturist, politician
- Antalovits Ferenc was born in Csepreg in 1953. He is a double European Championship bronze medalist and a four-time World Championship bronze medalist weight-lifter.

== Sport ==
The football club of Csepreg was founded in 1924. The biggest achievement was winning the First Division of Vas County in the season of 1996/97. Currently the team is in the First Division of Vas County in the season of 2019/20, led by the coach, Zsolt Steiner.

== Twin towns—sister cities ==
Csepreg is twinned with:

- Delnice, Croatia

== Gallery ==
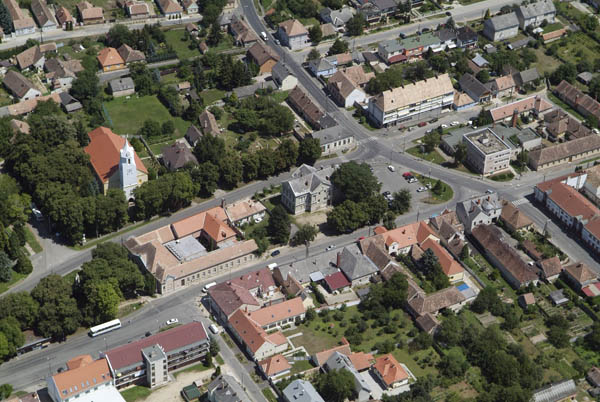
Aerial photography of Csepreg

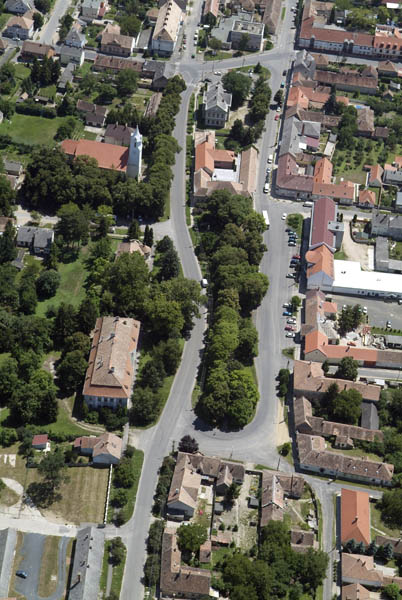

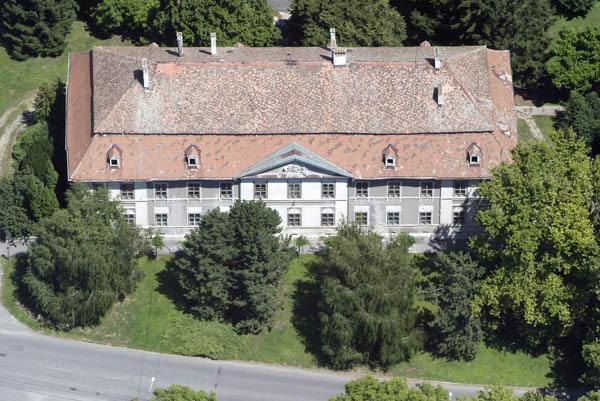
Schöller Castle

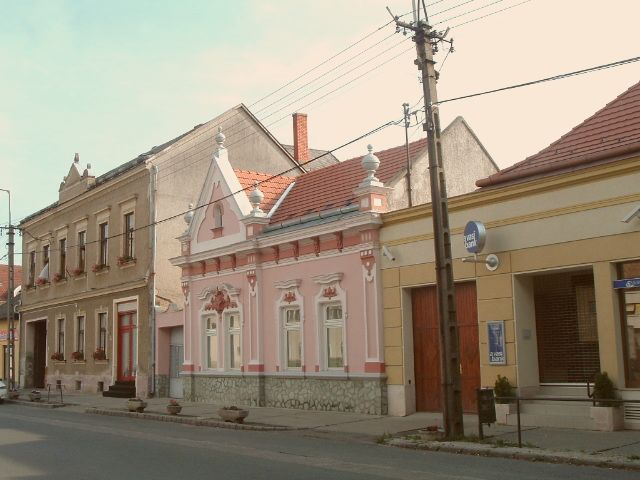
Main square—Széchenyi Square (detail)

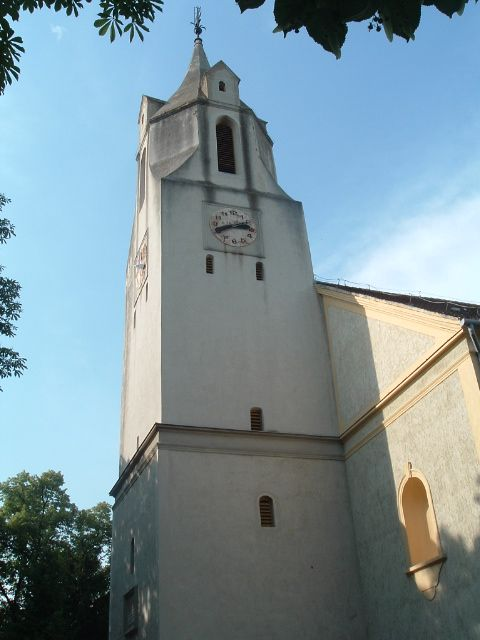
St. Nicholas Church

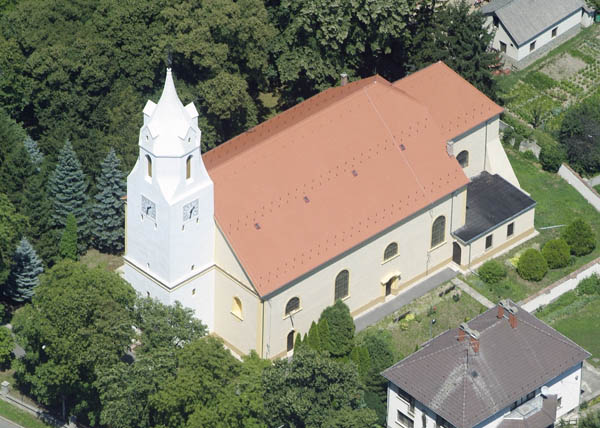
St. Nicholas Church

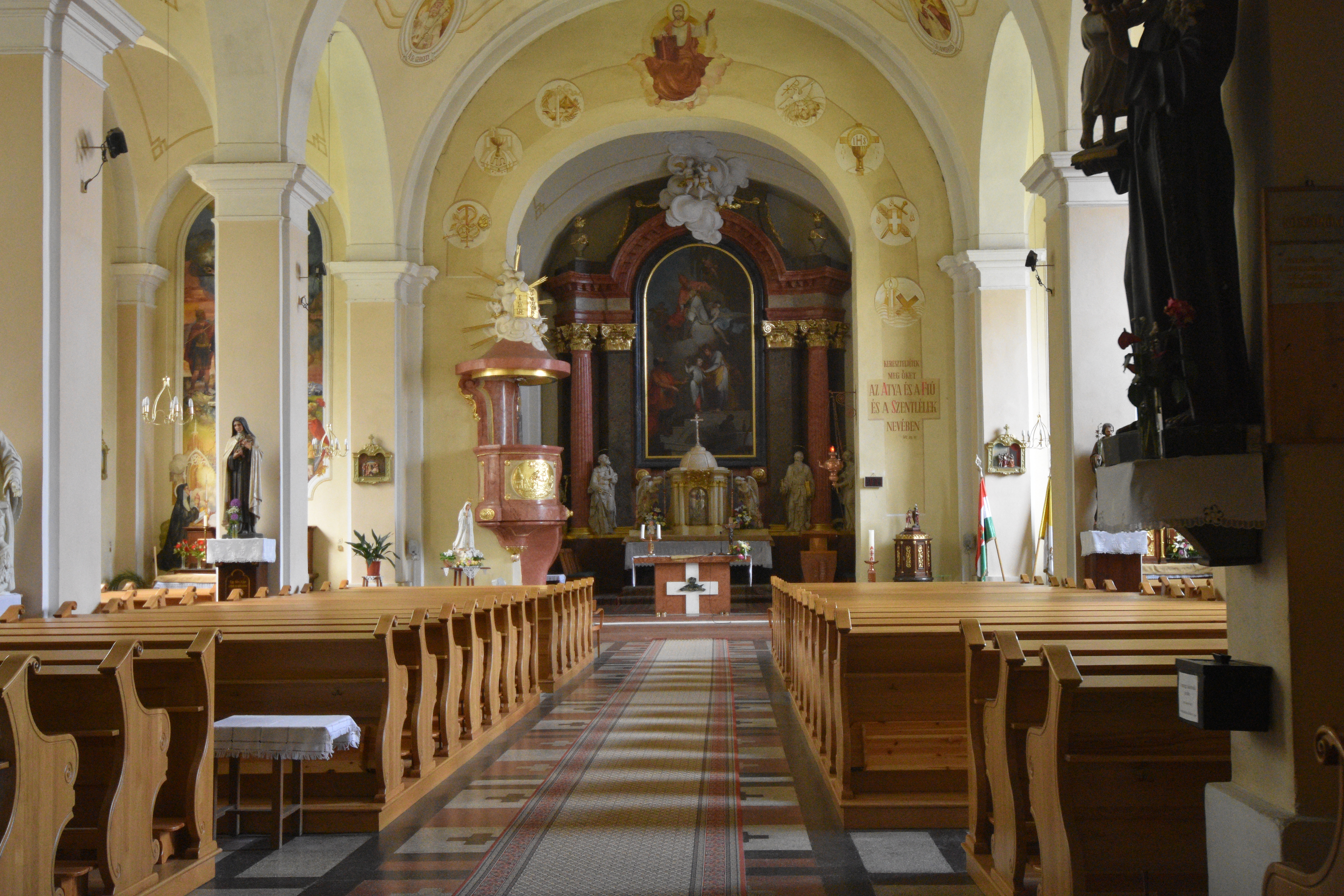
Inside the St. Nicholas Church

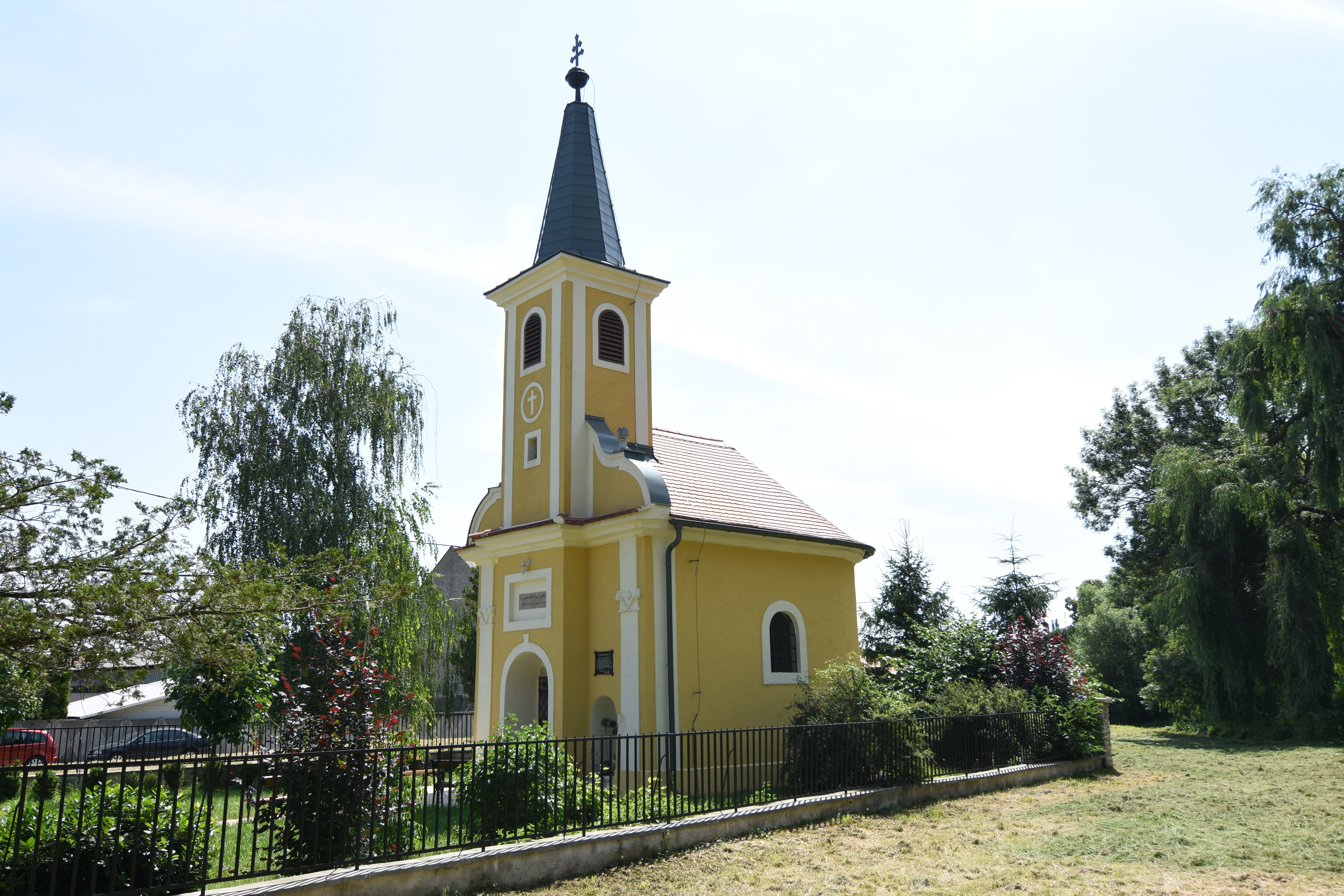
Chapel of the Holy Spring

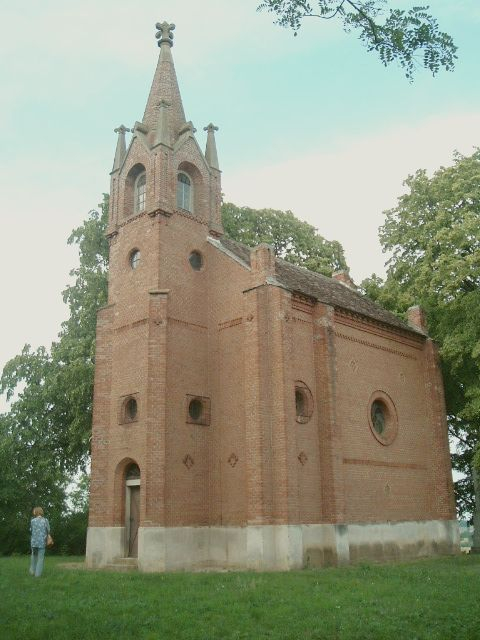

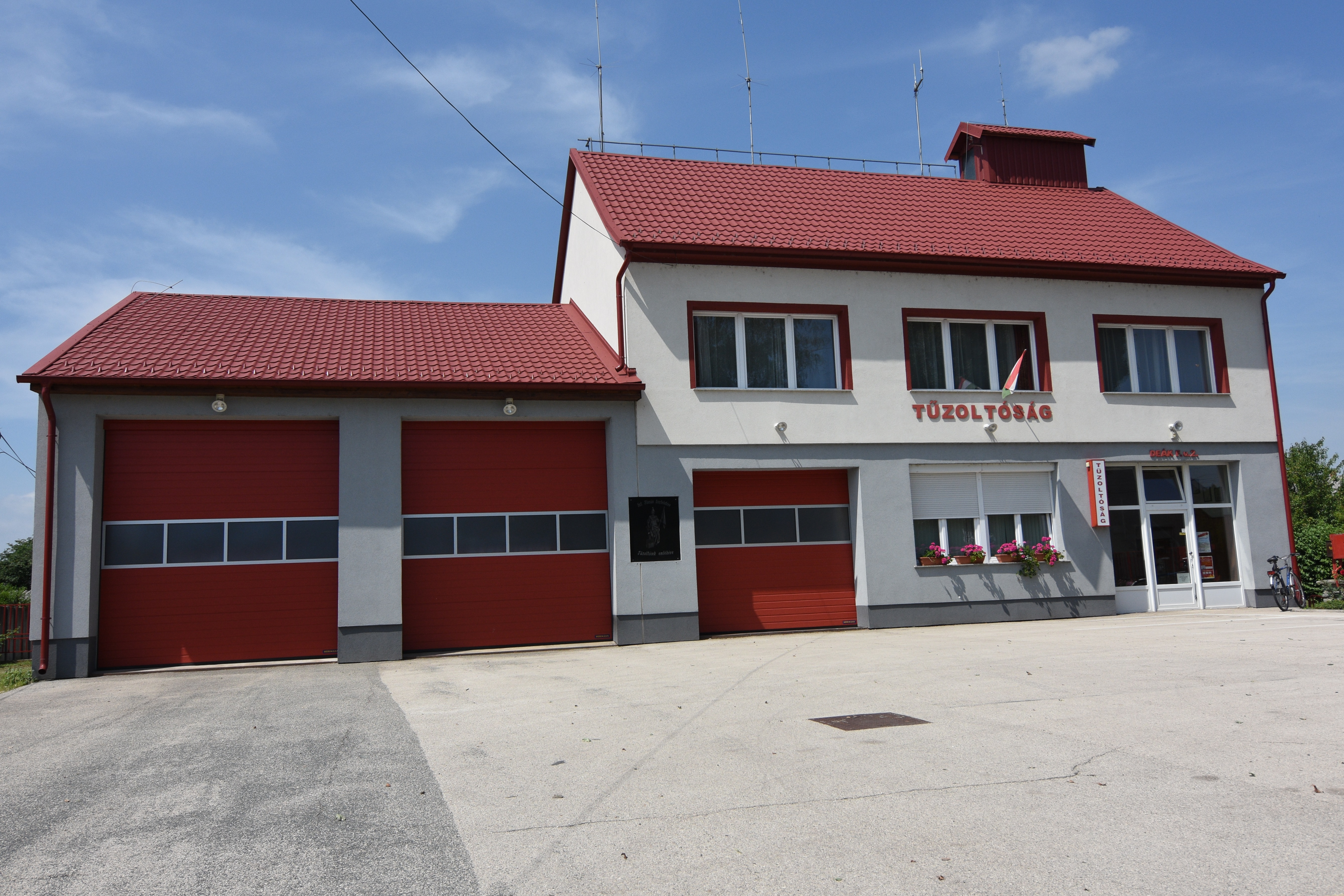
The Fire Station of Csepreg

Flag of Csepreg

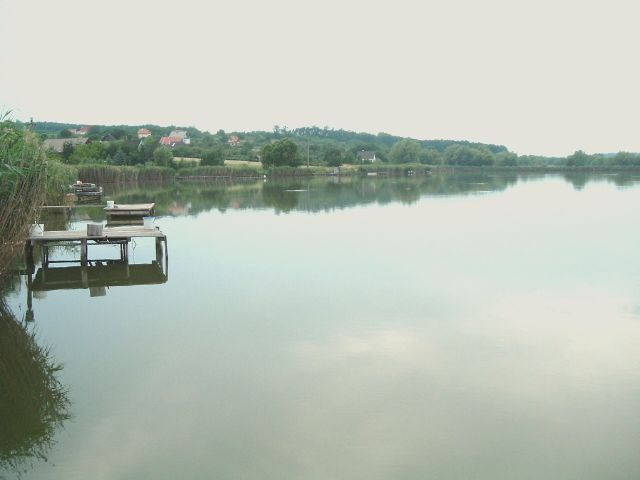
Lake Bene-hegy
