= Kőszegdoroszló =

Kőszegdoroszló Duorslov (in Croatian) Deutschdorf (in German)
- Village
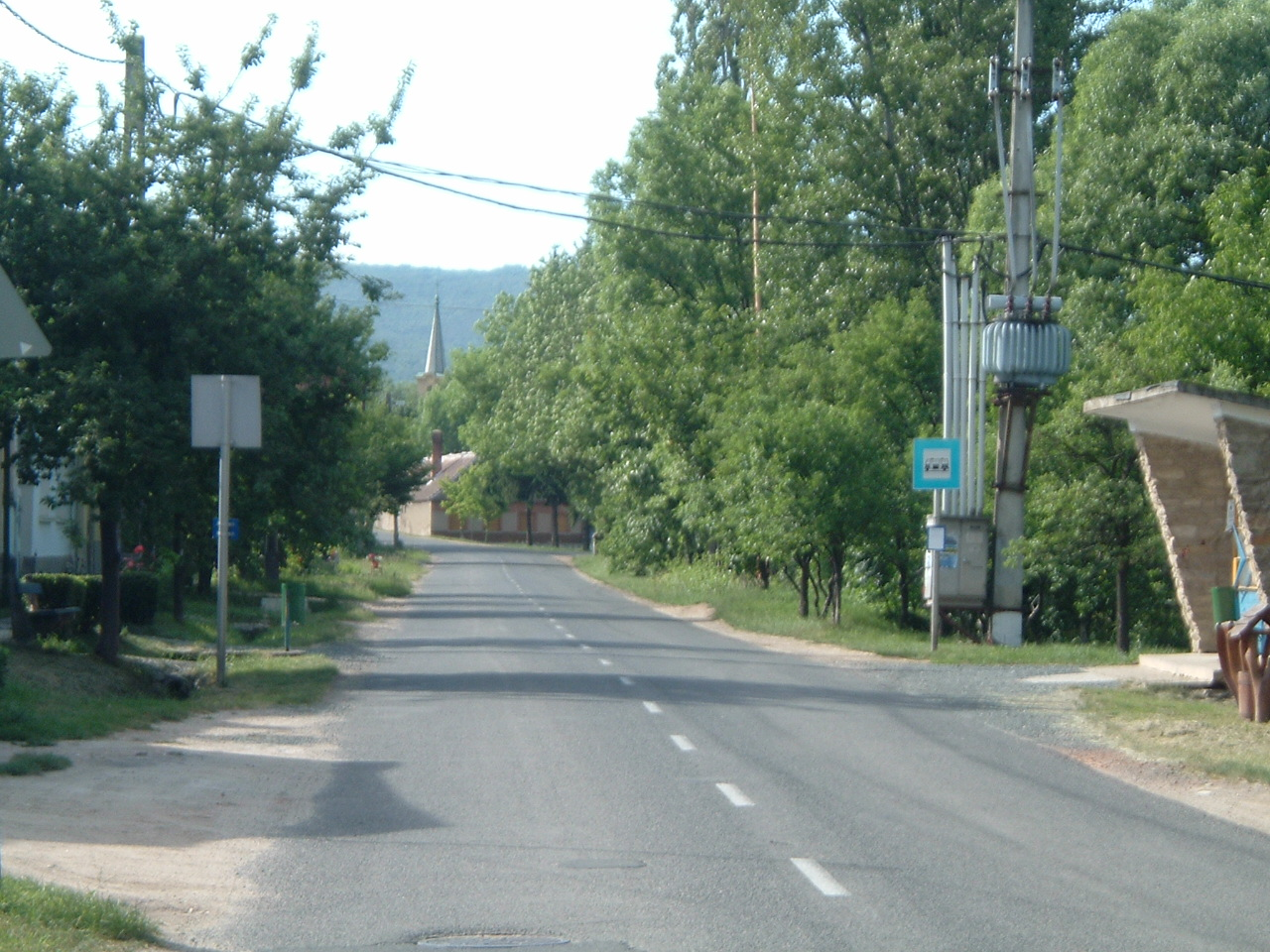

- Flag Coat of arms

- Location of Kőszegdoroszló
- Coordinates: 47.343281°N 16.544231°E
- Country: Hungary
- Region: Western Transdanubia
- County: Vas
- District: Kőszeg

Area
  - Total: 9.65 km^{2} (3.73 sq mi)

Population (1 January 2026)
  - Total: 310
  - Density: 32/km^{2} (83/sq mi)
- Time zone: UTC+1 (CET)
  - Summer (DST): UTC+2 (CEST)
- Postal code: 9725
- Area code: (+36) 94

Kőszegdoroszló (German: Deutschdorf) is a village in Vas county, Hungary. The village has a thriving tourist trade.
