= Sárvár =

- Town
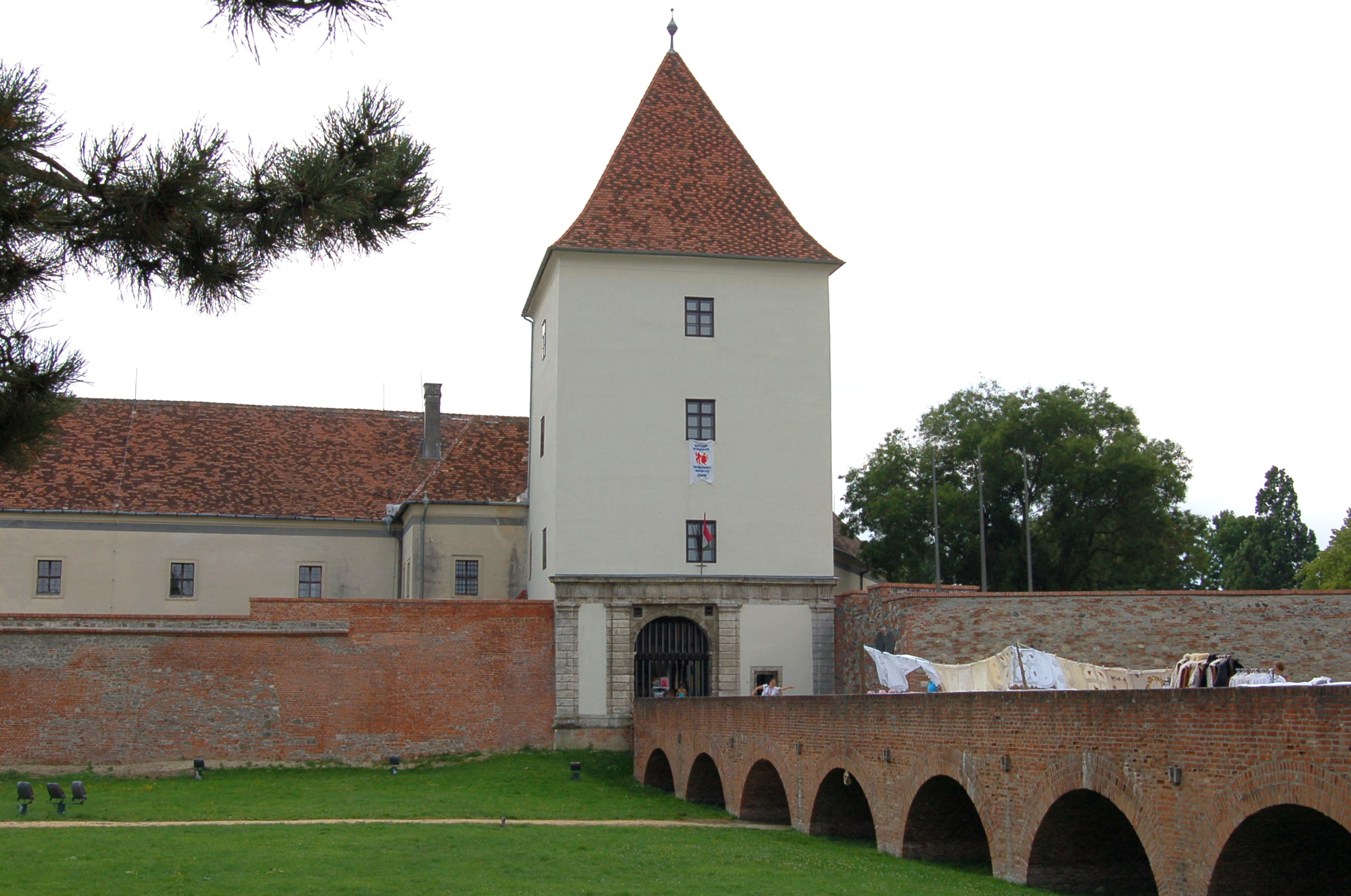

- Flag Coat of arms

- Location of Sárvár
- Coordinates: 47.25415°N 16.93545°E
- Country: Hungary
- County: Vas
- District: Sárvár

Area
  - Total: 64.64 km^{2} (24.96 sq mi)

Population (2019)
  - Total: 15,226
  - Density: 242/km^{2} (630/sq mi)
- Time zone: UTC+1 (CET)
  - Summer (DST): UTC+2 (CEST)
- Postal code: 9600, 9609
- Area code: (+36) 95
- Website: www.sarvar.hu

Sárvár (German: Kotenburg or Rotenturm an der Raab; Latin: Bassiana; Slovene: Mala Sela) is a town in Vas County, Hungary.

Sárvár lies on the banks of the River Rába at Kemeneshát. The population is nearly 16,000. The town has become a tourist centre of international renown.

== Etymology ==
Sár means "mud" in Hungarian, and vár means "castle". The latter is a common ending for settlement names.

== History ==
During World War II, Sárvár was used as a centre for the internment for Polish soldiers who had arrived in Hungary in 1939. Later in the war, Sárvár was used as a concentration camp for the internment for thousands of Serb families expelled by Hungarian soldiers from their homes in northern Serbia in 1941. Now, there is a monument and graveyard for hundreds of Serbs who died in the Sárvár concentration camp.

== Sights ==
Sárvár's notable sights include the spa (with its famous medicinal water), a Baroque church, an arboretum, the park forest and the Csónakázó Lake. A number of rarities of cultural remains are shown in the exhibition halls of the Ferenc Nádasdy Museum.

=== Castle ===
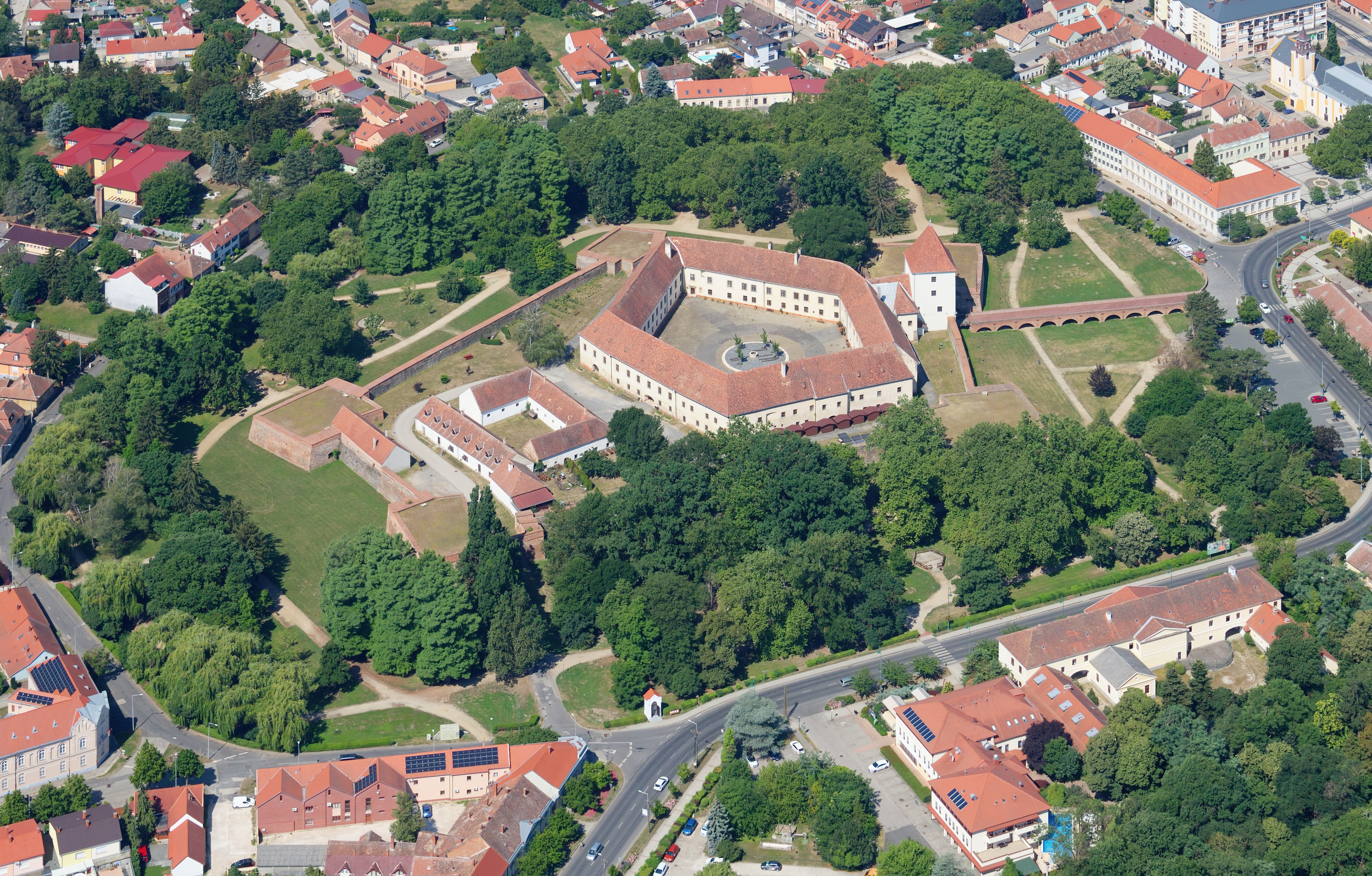
Aerial view of the castle

Through the Nádasdy family, the castle of Sárvár, now called Nádasdy Castle, played a significant role in the progress of Hungarian culture in the 16th and 17th centuries. The first Hungarian book, The New Testament of 1541, was printed here. The knight's hall of the castle is decorated with the battle scenes of Lord Chief Justice Ferenc Nádasdy (married to the notorious Elizabeth Báthory) and with scenes from the Old Testament.

The Nádasdy Castle and estate later became a property of the kings of Bavaria, and the former King Ludwig III died there in 1921, three years after being deposed. The last owner who was expropriated in 1945 was Prince Franz of Bavaria, a son of Ludwig III. Ludwig's grandson Prince Albert of Bavaria lived in exile in Budapest between 1939 and 1944 and visited his uncle Franz occasionally with his family before they were arrested by the Gestapo and deported to concentration camps in Germany. Prince Franz had set up a stud farm here, whose horses he took with him to Leutstetten Castle in Bavaria when he fled. Many of the estate's employees also fled there.

== Notable people ==
- Ludwig III of Bavaria
- Péter Balassa, footballer
- Alice Lok Cahana, Holocaust survivor and artist
- Edward Eisner, physicist and professor
- József Vass, politician
- József Vida, hammer thrower
- Takács de Saár, noble family
- Zoltán Stieber, footballer

== British avian flu outbreak ==
The Bernard Matthews Sága Foods plant in Sárvár, that processes turkeys, has been implicated in the H5N1 outbreak in Suffolk, England.

== Twin towns – sister cities ==
Sárvár is twinned with:

- Seini, Romania
- Sonntagberg, Austria
- Steinheim an der Murr, Germany
- Uherské Hradiště, Czech Republic
