= Gyöngyösfalu =

- Coat of arms

- Location of Gyöngyösfalu in Hungary
- Coordinates: 47°19′06″N 16°34′50″E
- Country: Hungary
- Region: Western Transdanubia
- County: Vas
- Subregion: Kőszegi
- Rank: Village

Area
  - Total: 9.66 km^{2} (3.73 sq mi)

Population (1 January 2008)
  - Total: 1,132
  - Density: 117/km^{2} (304/sq mi)
- Time zone: UTC+1 (CET)
  - Summer (DST): UTC+2 (CEST)
- Postal code: 9723
- Area code: +36 94
- KSH code: 11943
- Website: www.gyongyosfalu.hu

Gyöngyösfalu is a village in Vas county, Hungary.

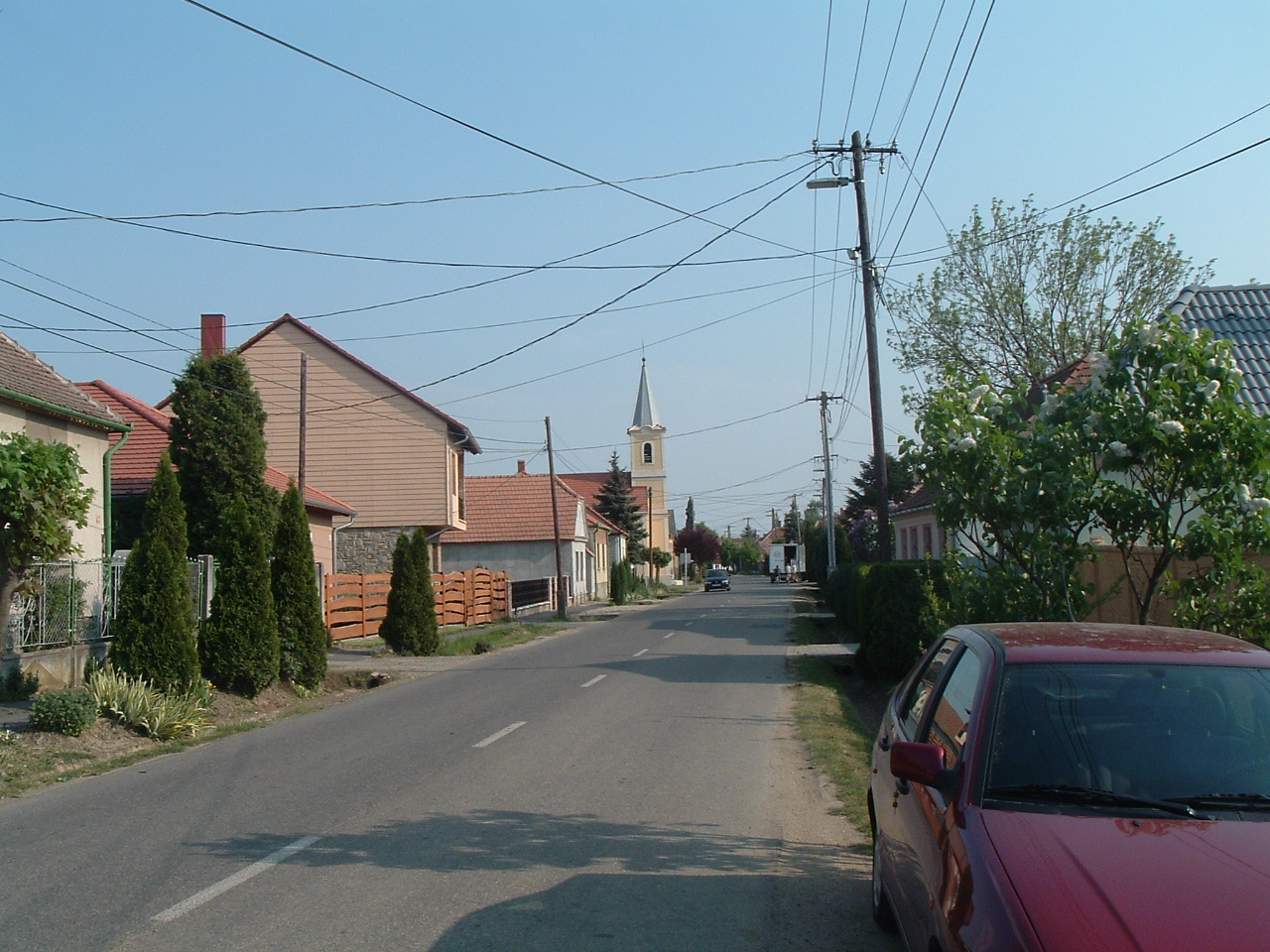
Main Street

== Districts ==
- Kispöse
- Ludad
- Nagypöse
- Seregélyháza
