= Kőszegpaty =

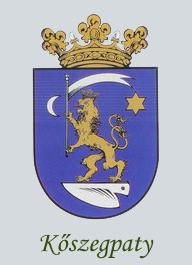
- Coat of arms

- Location of Kőszegpaty in Hungary
- Coordinates: 47°19′37.13″N 16°38′46.79″E
- Country: Hungary
- Region: Western Transdanubia
- County: Vas
- Subregion: Kőszegi
- Rank: Village

Area
  - Total: 12.25 km^{2} (4.73 sq mi)
- Time zone: UTC+1 (CET)
  - Summer (DST): UTC+2 (CEST)
- Postal code: 9739
- Area code: +36 94
- Website: www.koszegpaty.hu

Kőszegpaty is a village in Vas county, Hungary.

== Notable people ==
- Miklós Takács de Saár, silviculturist, politician
