= Cák =

Cák Caka (in Croatian) Zackenbach (in German)
- Village
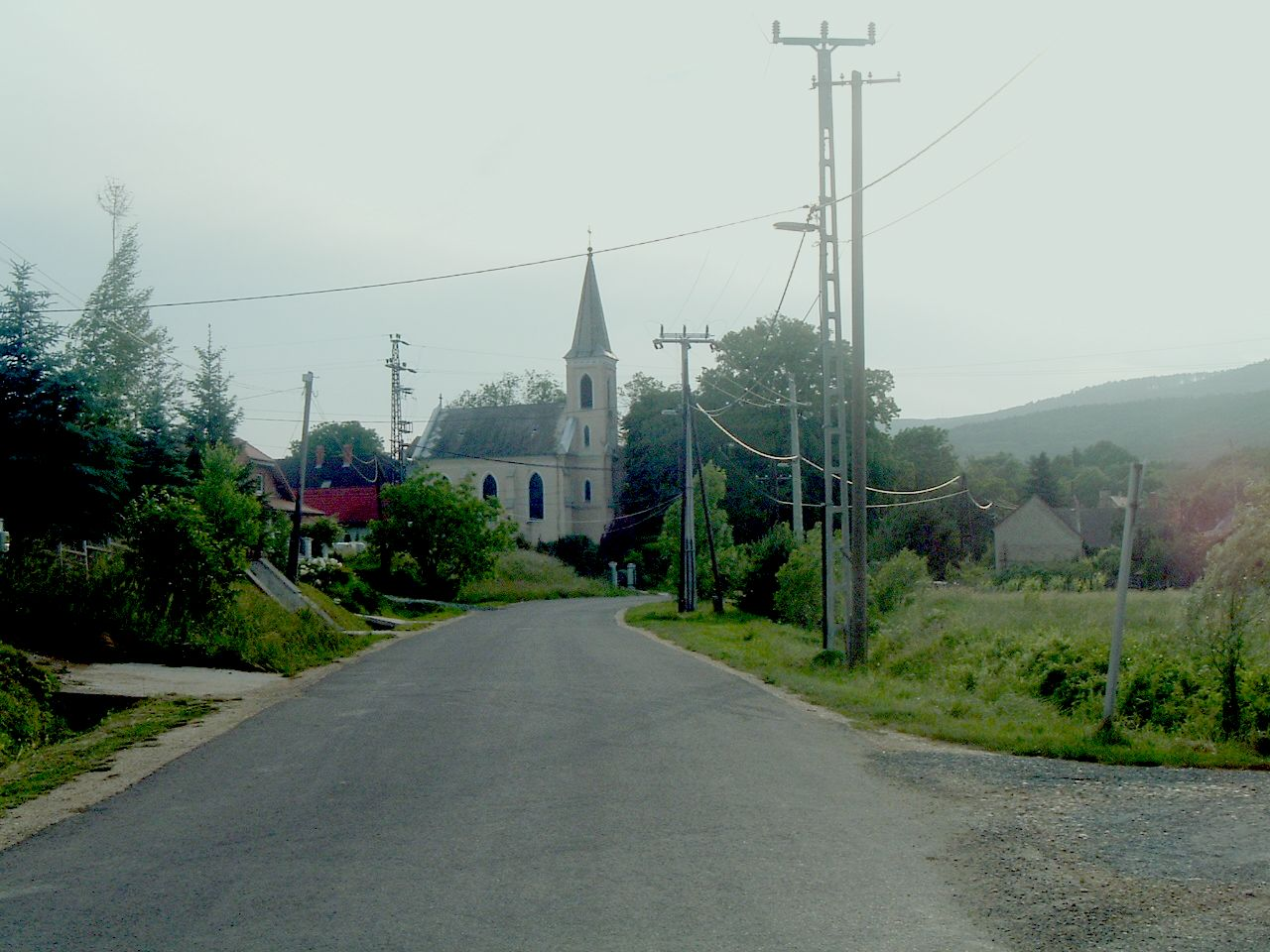

- Flag Coat of arms

- Location of Cák
- Coordinates: 47.35456°N 16.51470°E
- Country: Hungary
- Region: Western Transdanubia
- County: Vas
- District: Kőszeg

Area
  - Total: 6.48 km^{2} (2.50 sq mi)

Population (1 January 2025)
  - Total: 296
  - Density: 45.7/km^{2} (118/sq mi)
- Time zone: UTC+1 (CET)
  - Summer (DST): UTC+2 (CEST)
- Postal code: 9725
- Area code: (+36) 94
- Website: www.cak.hu

Cák is a village in Vas County, Hungary, 25 km away from Szombathely and 6 km south from Kőszeg.

== History ==
In Cák graves have been found from Roman times. The earliest known reference to the village was from 1279 as Villa Chak. Turks destroyed the village in 1532, and Christian soldiers burned it down in 1573 and 1606.
