= Tömörd =

- Location of Tömörd in Hungary
- Coordinates: 47°21′58.39″N 16°40′30.36″E
- Country: Hungary
- Region: Western Transdanubia
- County: Vas
- Subregion: Csepregi
- Rank: Village

Area
  - Total: 15.36 km^{2} (5.93 sq mi)

Population (1 January 2008)
  - Total: 283
  - Density: 18.4/km^{2} (47.7/sq mi)
- Time zone: UTC+1 (CET)
  - Summer (DST): UTC+2 (CEST)
- Postal code: 9738
- Area code: +36 94
- KSH code: 05166
- Website: https://tomord.hu/

Tömörd (Slovene: Temerje) is a village in Vas county, Hungary.
