= Ják (genus) =

Genus (gens) Ják
- Country: Kingdom of Hungary
- Founded: 11th century
- Dissolution: 14th century
- Cadet branches: a, senior branch b, Rába-left bank branch: Ebed sub-branch; House of Nicki; House of Kemény; House of Gyórói; Csuna sub-branch; House of Terestyénfalvi; House of Szelestei; House of Tibold; Alexander sub-branch; House of Szentivánfalvi; House of Sándorfalvi; c, Rába-right bank branch: House of Sitkei; House of Gétyei; House of Ölbői

Ják (Iak, Jaak or Thyak) was the name of a gens (Latin for "clan"; nemzetség in Hungarian) in the Kingdom of Hungary. They possessed estates in the western borderland along the river Rába, centered around their eponymous seat in Vas County. There, they erected an abbey church in the mid-13th century, which is the most significant surviving work of Hungarian Romanesque church architecture.

== Origin ==
Vecellin also came from Bavaria, namely from Wasserburg. Together with St. Stephen, he killed Duke Koppány in Somogy; for he was the captain of the army on that day. The line of Ják springs from them.

— Illuminated Chronicle

The next to enter Hungary was Count Wenzilin from Wasserburg. He killed Duke Koppány in Somogy. His kindred are called the Ják.

— Simon of Kéza: Gesta Hunnorum et Hungarorum

The Illuminated Chronicle, which incorporated texts from the 11–14th chronicles, claims that the forefather of the Jáks was Bavarian knight Vecellin, who, originating from Wasserburg, arrived in Hungary as a member of the entourage of Queen Gisela in 997 or 998. He played a decisive role in the defeat of Koppány, who contested the legitimacy of Stephen, Grand Prince of the Hungarians. The chronicle also notes that "the aforesaid Vecellin begot Radi, Radi begot Miska, Miska begot Koppány and Martin", The chronicle claims that the famous 11th-century warrior Opos the Brave was also a descendant of Vecellin. As a result, historical scholars have long considered that the passages of the Gesta Ladislai regis were written by a member of the Ják kindred, plausibly Bishop Koppány, at the end of the 11th century.

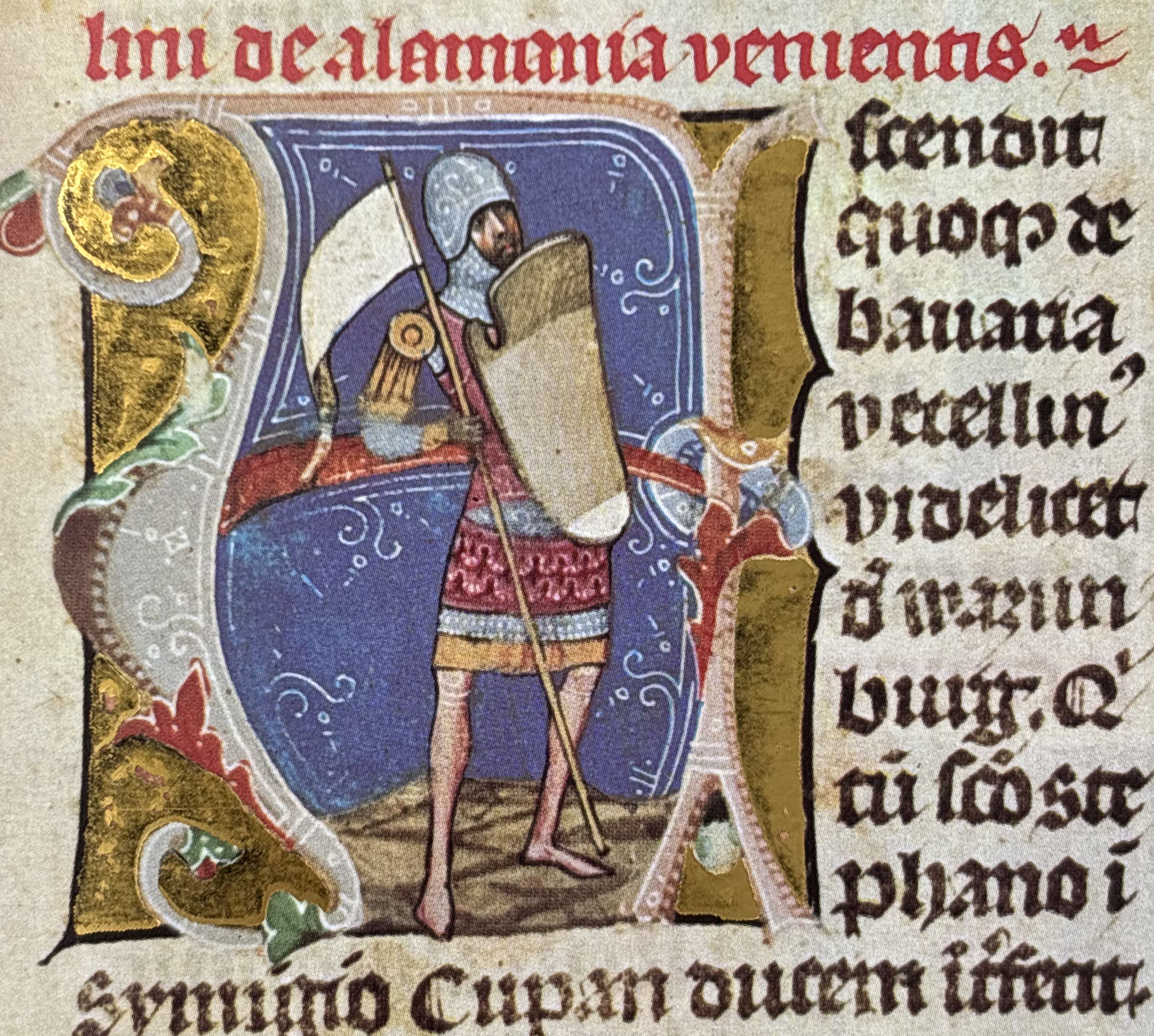
Medieval chronicles say that 11th-century Bavarian knight Vecellin was progenitor of the gens Ják

The Benedictine historian Lajos J. Csóka, however, showed that, instead of the Jáks, the gens Rád descended from Vecellin, who had been granted lands in the northernmost part of Somogy County after Stephen's victory. Consequently, the clan was named after Radi (or Rád), the son of Vecellin. György Györffy argued that the connection of Vecellin with the Ják kindred was a mistake by the mid-13th-century chronicler Ákos, who interpolated and supplemented the original chronicle text, often erroneously and anachronistically. Elemér Mályusz argued that the chronicler intended to add notable descendants to the knight Vecellin, but by then the Ráds could only be classified as members of the lesser nobility without political power. György Rácz considered that Ákos' contemporary, Zlaudus Ják was the driving force behind the chronicler's connection of the person of Vecellin with the emerging noble kindred, to make their arrival to Hungary earlier than it actually happened. Accordingly, Zlaudus brought the family's existing Bavarian connections and the gradually developing cult of Saint George (see below) into harmony with the tradition surrounding Vecellin. Tibor Almási considered that although the origin of the kindred has been erroneously traced back to the time of Vecellin, its Bavarian origin is certain.

Rácz considered that the Ják kindred was of Hungarian ethnicity, instead of their supposed foreign origin, which theory is strengthened by the frequency of Hungarian names within the clan (for instance, Csuna, Ebed, Kemény, Kopasz and Szabolcs) and the almost complete absence of German names. Györffy argued that the clan's lion crest confirms the same assumption, and he took into account that, due to the similar spelling, they were perhaps close relatives of the Csáks. József Dénes and István Herényi assumed identity between the two genera, but this could not be confirmed with sources. Rácz argued the name of the kindred formed from a given name, i.e. Ják, which was a diminutive form of Jacob or James. Accordingly, sometime in the 11th–12th century there lived a nobleman named Ják or Jakó, who possessed lands in Vas County. It is possible he is identical with that Jakó, father of ispán Achilles, who was a partisan of Coloman, King of Hungary in the 1110s. In the area of present-day Ják, archaeologists have also excavated 11th-century buildings and the predecessor of the St. James Chapel from the same period.

== History ==
By the early 13th century, when the Jáks first appear in contemporary records, approximately three main branches of the genus have developed, indicating that their settlement has been taking place for quite some time. The joint estates of the clan were divided among themselves sometime in the 12th century, only the ancient seat, Ják, remained in undivided ownership. The senior branch, whose members founded the monasteries in the region, possessed lands along the river Pinka, a tributary of the Rába. The so-called Rába-left bank branch possessed estates around Jákfa – they were relatively poorer and were considered royal servants only –, while the Rába-right bank branch, which was closer in relationship to the senior branch, centered around Sitke. Beside Vas County, the Ják kindred possessed landholdings in the neighboring Zala County, but also in other parts of the Kingdom of Hungary, in, for instance, Temes, Bodrog, Csanád and Valkó counties.

During the 13th century, the separation of the three branches had already begun: in 1259, Martin (II) from the senior branch handed over the estate Dabrapatak and paid 10 marks additionally to members of the clan's left-bank branch – Reynold, Mika, Tristan and Martin – in exchange for renouncing all their claims to the inheritance of the late Csépán (I). The two poorer branches then had no say in what estates the senior branch (extinct around 1292) acquired. The years-long lawsuit over the extinct Sebe branch represented a further separation. Despite Sebe and his kinship belonged to the clan's right-bank branch, but since they had estates in the territory of the left-bank branch (portions in Jákfa and Köröselő) too, the latter also had a claim to their wealth. Their aspirations were supported by the powerful lord Ivan Kőszegi, who ruled Western Transdanubia de facto independently of the royal power since the 1280s. Sebe's son, Stephen died without descendants in 1289; his inheritance passed to his brother, the similarly childless Nicholas. Under pressure, the right-bank branch renounced all their inheritance claims in that year. They later retracted this, citing that they made their statement in response to death threats from the Kőszegi family. They could not enforce their rights because of the influence of Ivan Kőszegi. In 1290, Nicholas announced that he makes the left-bank branch the sole heir to his lands with the approval of the right-bank branch. The treaty clearly defined Rába and the surrounding forest as the natural boundaries between the estates of the two branches: the right-bank branch (Lawrence and Csépán, and their offspring) owned lands to the south and east of it, while the left-bank branch (Ebed's offspring) possessed their estates to the north and west. The treaty prohibited the two branches from acquiring land and settling into the territory of the other branch.

After Nicholas bequeathed his aforementioned estates to John from the clan's Terestyénfalva branch in 1291, the conflict escalated between the two branches. Mutual damage, looting, and the forced displacement and killing of serfs became commonplace in the region. The two branches finally reconciled again in late 1293 and early 1294; the right-bank branch renounced all legal claims under the burden of losing their wealth and losing a decisive duel. This was the last time that clan affiliation appeared, because the document also stated that anyone who thereafter raised arms against any member of the kinship would be exiled and expelled from the Ják clan.

=== Senior branch ===
==== Founders of monasteries ====
The first certainly known member of the branch and the entire clan was Mika (I), or Mike, who rose to become one of the most influential supporters of Emeric, King of Hungary by the end of the 12th century. He supported the monarch during the rebellions of his younger brother Andrew against his rule in the late 1190s. For his role in the conflict, Elvin, Bishop of Várad (Andrew's partisan) even excommunicated him. He served as Master of the treasury, Judge royal, then Palatine of Hungary in the period 1198–1201. Beside these positions, he also administered Bihar and Bács counties in the eastern part of the kingdom.

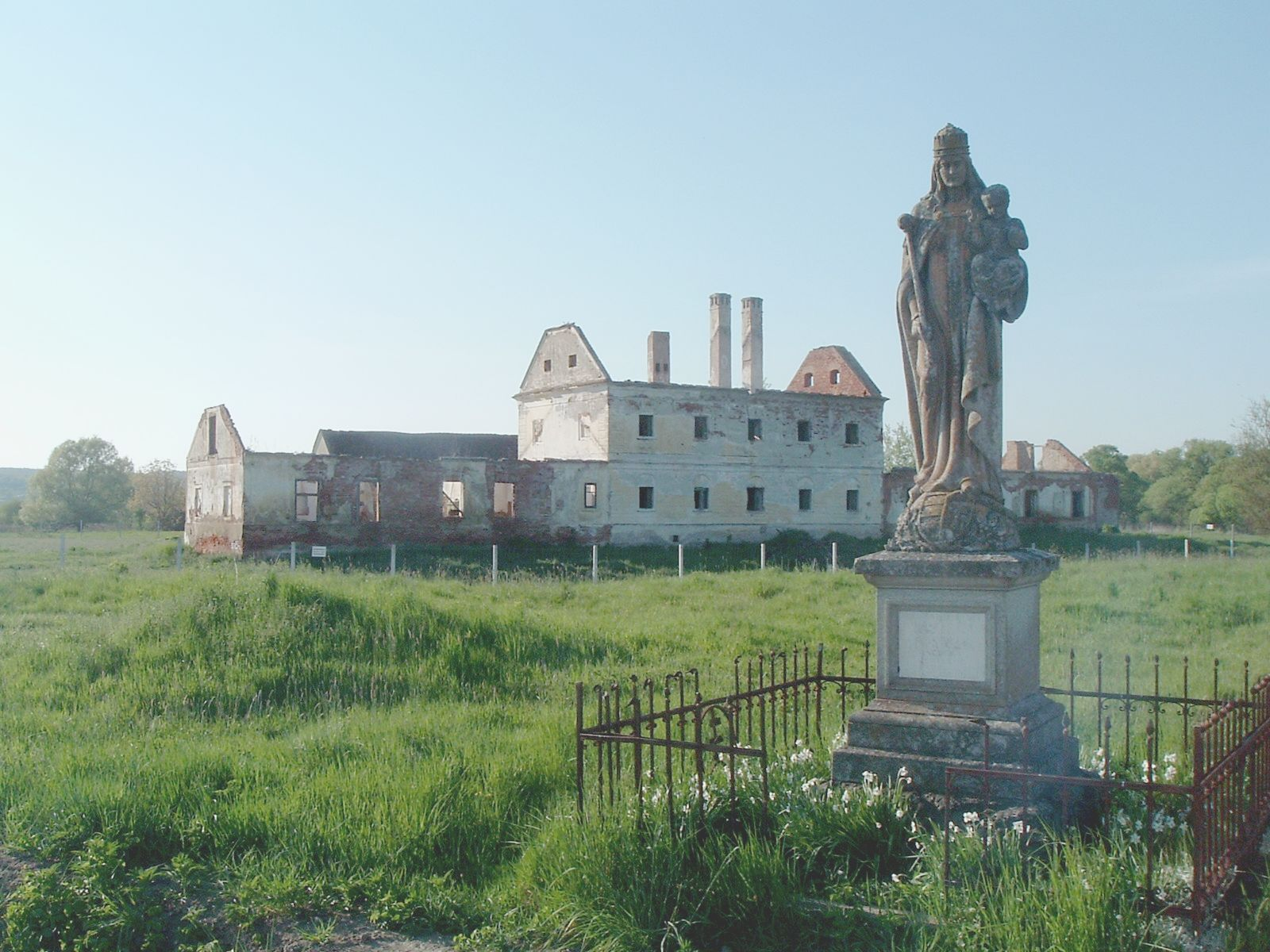
Ruins of the former abbey building in Pornóapáti

Mika's only known son was Csépán (I). Some academic works consider that Ivan (Jovan), from whom later generations of the Jáks descended, was Csépán's brother, but it is more likely that he was his uncle (i.e. Mika's brother). Despite his father's affiliation, Csépán rose to prominence after Andrew II ascended the Hungarian throne in 1205. He served as Ban of Slavonia from 1206 to 1207. Beside that, he was also styled as ispán of Somogy County in 1207. He remained in both positions until 1208 and 1209 at the latest, respectively. The reason for his loss of influence was that after the first few years, King Andrew no longer needed the support and government experience of the former pro-Emeric lords. According to a royal charter from 1325, Csépán (I) erected the Benedictine monastery of Pornó. The settlement was his permanent residence, he lived in a mansion on an island at the confluence of the Pornó stream and the Pinka river. The abbey was dedicated to Margaret of Antioch. Since a 1221 charter attributes this merit to Mika, the process was probably started by his father, and his son, Csépán, completed the foundation of the abbey and its provision with donations (possibly around 1214). Prior to 1209, Csépán possessed the lordship of Szentgyörgy in Pozsony County (present-day Svätý Jur, Slovakia), but King Andrew II bought from him and donated it to his faithful partisan Sebes Hont-Pázmány in that year. Thereafter, the lordship became the eponymous seat of the Szentgyörgyi family from the Hont-Pázmány clan. Csépán was still alive in 1216, when Andrew II confirmed his donation to Sebes. He definitely died before 1221, but he was probably not even alive in 1219 (see below). He was buried in the abbey church of Pornó.

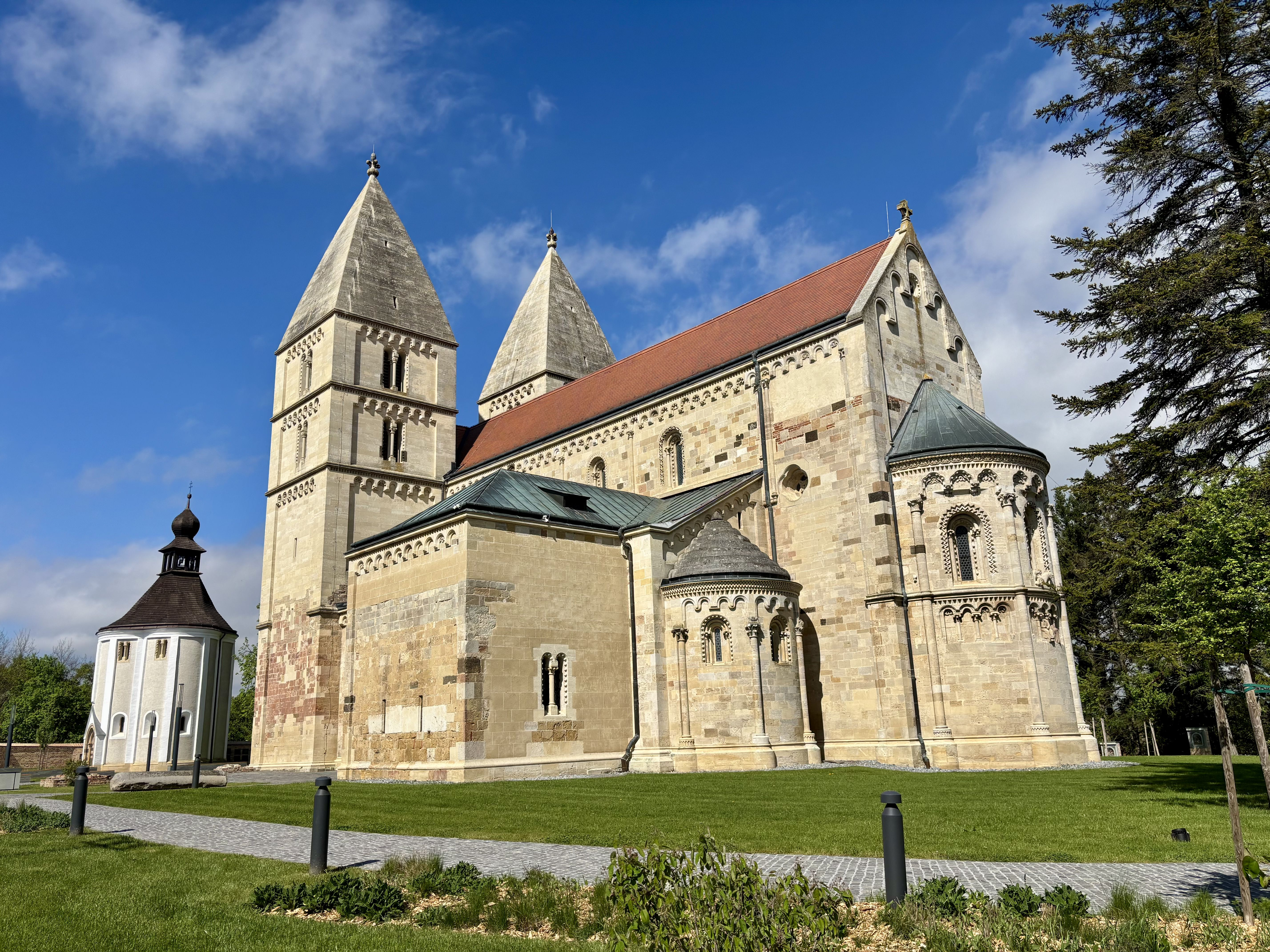
The church of Ják after its renovation in 2025. Next to it (left) is the Chapel of St. James

Csépán's only known son was Stephen (I), who was still an adolescent when his father died. He became a Cistercian friar. With the permission of Andrew II, he handed over Pornó Abbey and its right of patronage to the Szentgotthárd Abbey, where he himself moved, in a lengthy process in 1219–1223. With this act of incorporation, Stephen also renounced his inheritance in favor of the Cistercians, which consisted of additional four villages – Monyorókerék, Hétfőhely, Perwolf and Kölked – besides Pornó. This was preceded by the division of Csépán's estates among the branches of the Ják kindred.

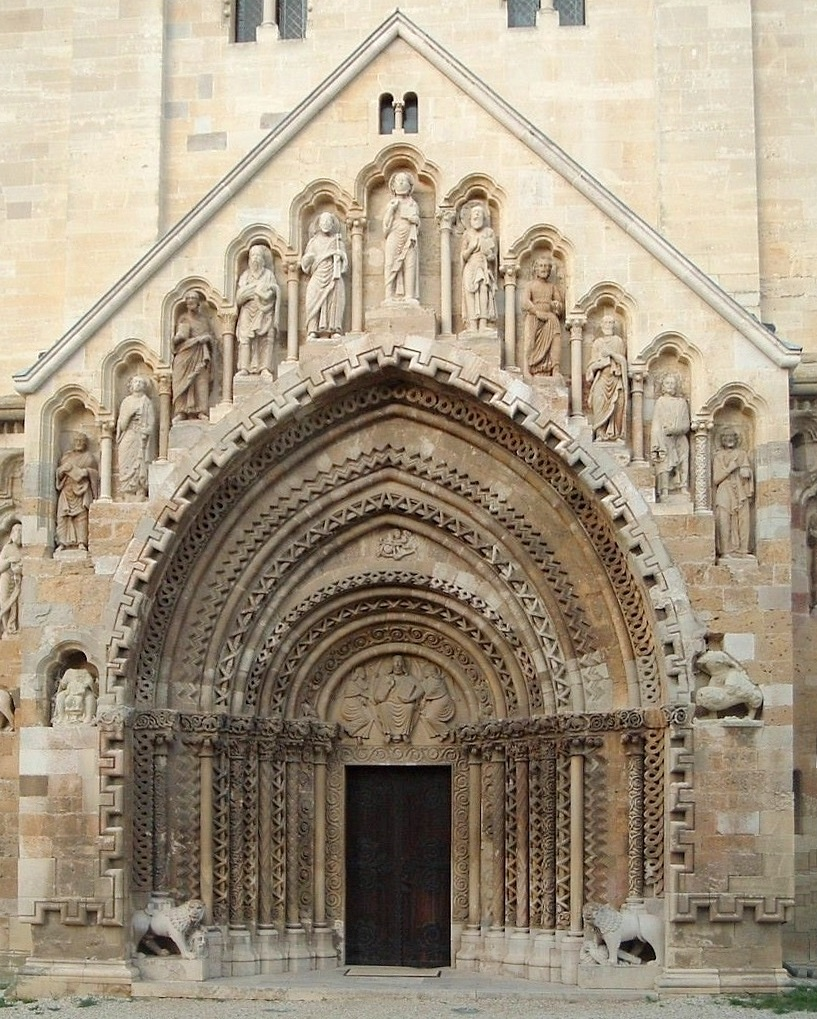
West portal of the abbey church of Ják

Stephen's move contributed to Csépán's cousin, Martin (I) (who was the son of Ivan), starting the foundation of the Benedictine abbey of Ják and the construction of its Romanesque church, dedicated to Saint George, which took place around 1220. The construction took decades and it was consecrated in 1256, after the death of Martin. As a confidant of Duke Béla, who became king in 1235, Martin (I) served as ispán of Vas (1215, 1224, 1236) and Zala counties (1240–1241), and perhaps he was also Ban of Slavonia for a brief time in 1224. He was the most influential member of his kindred during his generation; his relatives were styled as "de genere Martini comitis", instead of naming the Ják clan, since the 1230s. Under his leadership, the senior branch became completely independent from the poorer branches of the family. Martin (I) and his brother James handed over their estate Köröselő (laid near Jákfa) to the left-bank branch, becoming geographically separated from their poorer relatives. In 1244, Martin, James and their sons were mentioned as neighboring lords near Đakovo (Diakovár) in Valkó County, since they possessed the lordship of Nevna (present-day Levanjska Varoš in Croatia). 14th-century documents (from 1325 and 1333) styled the late Martin with the epithet "the Great" (Magnus), which, in addition to his former social prestige, was primarily intended to clearly distinguish him from his namesake son and grandson by his descendants.

Martin (I) and his family lived in Ják, seat of the entire clan. He had a walled residential tower built on the site of the previous early-12th-century brick manor (or palace), which met the customs of the time. The remains of this were eventually removed when the Baroque abbey house was built in the late 18th century. The Hungarian art history has established that there is a demonstrably close connection between the stone carvings of the Ják church and of the ones in the Bamberg Cathedral, which was rebuilt at the same time as its construction, but the influence of northern French, Norman and Burgundian stonemason workshops can also be detected. It is likely that master builders from Bamberg worked on Ják in the 1220s and 1230s. Martin and/or his sons constructed another church in Nyirád in Zala County, which the Jáks owned. Stone carvings were found in the current church whose style was similar to the decorations of the church in Ják. Martin died around 1250; he was buried under the southern tower of the church. His grave was excavated by archaeologists in 2021. After the consecration of the abbey church in 1256, which was reserved exclusively for the noble kindred, the nearby Saint James chapel became the village's parish church.

==== Zlaudus' acquisitions ====
Of the three sons of Martin (I), Zlaudus entered ecclesiastical career, while Casimir and Martin (II) had no political role in the court of Béla IV. Zlaudus had been lector of the collegiate chapter of Székesfehérvár from 1226 to 1239. Beside that, he was styled as chancellor in the court of Queen Yolanda of Courtenay in 1226. He bought Szántó from John Kaplon (son of Andronicus) from his clan's Terebes branch prior to 1236. The charter issued in that year refers to them as "relatives", as a result, earlier Hungarian historiography mistakenly considered Zlaudus and his kinship as members of the gens Kaplon. Zlaudus' seal from 1237 is the earliest known depiction of Saint George and the Dragon in Hungary. At the time of the first Mongol invasion of Hungary (1241–1242), he already served as provost of Pressburg. Beside that, he was also a canon of the cathedral chapter of Veszprém. During that period, a local landowner named Tátika sacked and looted Zlaudus' estate Szántó. In response, the judicial court confiscated the latter's three villages – Botka, Pabar and Bozlog – and handed them over to Zlaudus, but Tátika obstructed the process by force.

Seal of Zlaudus, depicting Saint George and the Dragon, from 1237

Zlaudus was elected Bishop of Veszprém by the cathedral chapter in late 1244 or early 1245. Since the canons elected him without the consent of King Béla IV, the monarch filed a complaint to the Roman Curia that Zlaudus' election and confirmation violated the ancient rights of the kings of Hungary. After papal investigation, Zlaudus remained bishop and thus his relationship with the king remained low-key until his death, which also had a negative impact on the political influence of the Ják clan.

After a lengthy lawsuit, Zlaudus was granted the hill of Várad from Tátika's family as a compensation in 1248. There, the bishop built his castle on top of the hill sometime between 1248 and 1257, while he possessed another at the foot of the hill, both were called Tátika. Those were among the first private castles in the Kingdom of Hungary, which built after the Mongols' withdrawal. Zlaudus entrusted his brothers, Casimir and Martin (II) as castellans of the two forts in the 1250s. Since the episcopal castle of Veszprém was not suitable for proper defense, Zlaudus transferred the bishopric's relics, treasures, charters and letters of privilege to his new castle. Beside Szántó and Tátika, Zlaudus also possessed Egerszeg, Véged, Gyűrűs, Nyirád, Szőc and Oltárc in Zala County.

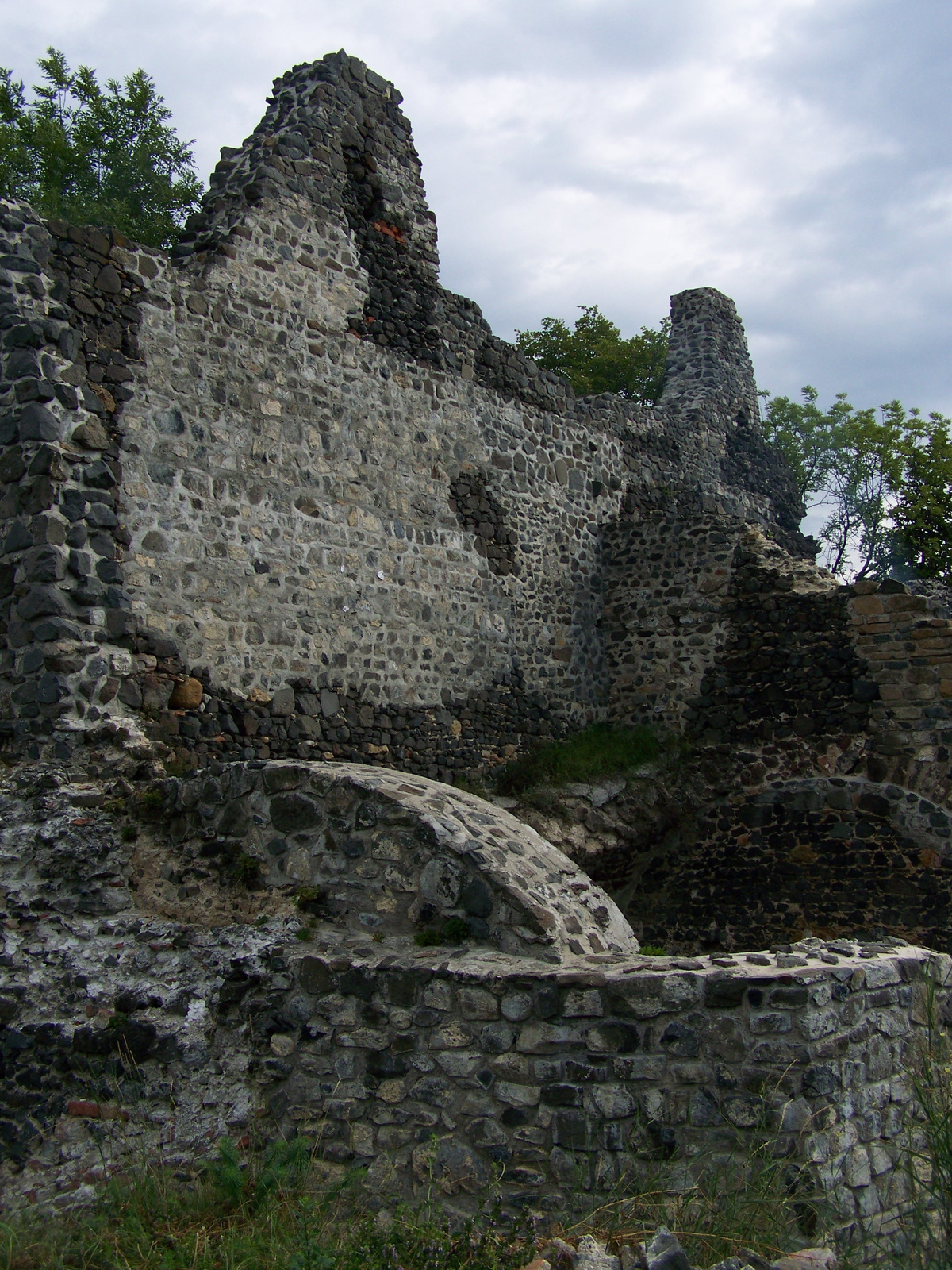
The ruins of the upper castle of Tátika near Zalaszántó

Zlaudus generously financed the construction work of the Ják family monastery. Under his influence, the Benedictine abbey was granted jurisdiction (ius magistratus) over the revenues of the Saint Michael church in Jákfa in 1249. After his father died, the construction was completed quickly and the Ják church was consecrated in 1256. Modeled after the Ják abbey church, Zlaudus also built a three-nave, three-apse, tower-paired church, dedicated to Saint George, in Véged. He constructed another church in Nyirád. Stone carvings were found in the current church whose style was similar to the decorations of the church in Ják. The elderly Zlaudus, for his spiritual salvation, donated his estate Szántó and the two castles of Tátika with their accessories to the cathedral chapter of Veszprém in 1257, with the consent of his brothers, Casimir and Martin. The Hungarian king confirmed the donation in November in that year. Béla's charter emphasizes that the castle does not belong to his brothers anyway, because Zlaudus himself acquired it from Tátika for the annihilation of the peoples of the church (which, however, was an intentional misrepresentation on the part of the royal court, as Zlaudus received the territory due to personal damage). With this step, Zlaudus deprived his own clan of a valuable advantage in an era when possession of castles became one of the main pillars of political and economic power. Although it is possible that after his election as bishop, Zlaudus was only concerned with the church and his diocese, but, it is more likely that he did so not of his own free will, but under the influence of pressure exerted by King Béla. Zlaudus and his kindred were partisans of Duke Stephen, the king's heir, whose relationship with his father became increasingly strained from that time on. However, a significant part of their estates lay in the western part, in the core of Béla's realm. The king confiscated the villages Szentmihály and Incéd (present-day Großpetersdorf and Dürnbach in Austria, respectively) in Vas County from the Jáks at an unknown time.

Prior to 1259, Martin (II) exchanged his land Korpna with his cousins, Stephen (II) and Bartholomew (sons of James) in return for their possession in Dabrapatak. Martin, also in the name of his brother Casimir and his nephew Csépán (II), handed over this estate, with the consent of its above-mentioned former owners, in addition to his land Gór and 10 marks to heads of the clan's left-bank branch in 1259 (see above).

==== Decline and extinction ====
Following Zlaudus' death in 1262, his brother Martin (II) and his nephews – John, Martin (III) and Mika (II) – refused to hand over the two castles called Tátika to the Diocese of Veszprém. They had also seized the episcopal treasures together with all charters and letters of privilege and the holy relics belonging to the bishop's chapel (including a golden chalice donated by King Béla to the church of Veszprém) and the 120 marks that Zlaudus bequeathed to the diocese. To avoid prosecution, Martin (II) and his sons fled to junior king Stephen's realm in the midst of the emerging civil war between father and son. No courts were able to enforce the convictions. Bishop Paul Balog filed a lawsuit against Martin and his sons in 1265–1266, after the reconciliation between Béla and Stephen. In November 1266, the Hungarian monarch, who wrongly claimed that Zlaudus received the hill of Tátika for the destruction of the episcopal estate Erek (laid near Sümeg), where the late bishop possessed an episcopal manor, ruled that they had to return the two Tátika castles, and in return for the damage caused worth 5400 marks of silver, they had to cede their villages of Szántó, Nyirád and Szőc to the bishopric. The royal charter narrates that the other living members of the Jáks' senior branch, Csépán (II) and Bartholomew also contributed to the verdict. It is known from the later development of the history of the estates that the royal court were able to enforce the judgment this time. In another document issued a few days later, Béla IV confiscated their another land Egerszeg from Martin and his sons, and donated it to the cathedral chapter as a compensation for the stolen golden chalice and 120 marks, also with the consent of Csépán and Bartholomew.

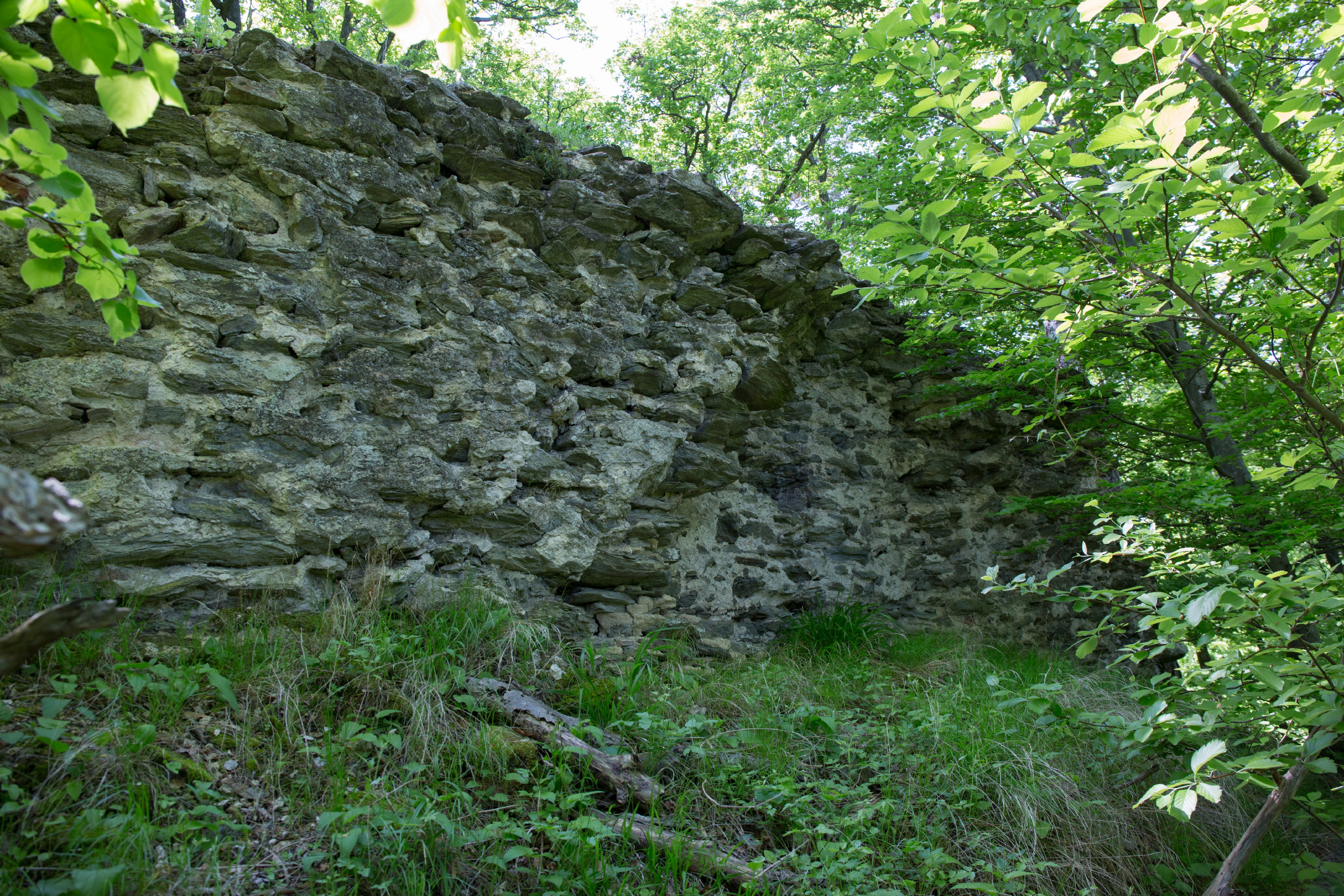
The ruins of the fort of Rechnitz (Rohonc)

Csépán (II) fought in the Bohemian–Hungarian wars during the reigns of Stephen V and Ladislaus IV in the early 1270s. His military service enabled his political and social rise, which was the "swan song" of the Jáks' senior branch. He was granted the estates Szentmihály, along with a small fort, and Incéd by Ladislaus IV in July 1273. Both villages would have been his own inheritance, because it was an inherited property of Csépán's ancestors, but it was taken from them during the reign of King Béla IV. During the era of feudal anarchy, Csépán (II) affiliated with the powerful gens Csák. He served as Master of the cupbearers from 1274 to 1275. He lost his position, when the Csáks' rivals regained their dominance over the royal council. He functioned as ispán of Vas County twice, in 1276 and 1279. Possibly via royal donation, Csépán acquired the lordship of Monyorókerék, which was once part of the Jáks' wealth. There, he also possessed the castle lay along the western border, which was presumably built by the Hungarian kings prior to that. Csépán constructed the castle of Rohonc (present-day Rechnitz, Austria) in his estate, which became his permanent residence. He took part in the royal campaign against the Cumans in 1282. Sometime in the mid-1280s, Csépán, who was ailing and made a last will and testament, bequeathed his estates Sömjén (Rábasömjén), Gyöngyöstő (present-day both are boroughs of Sárvár) and Véged to his familiares Baksa and Csépán (from the Ják clan's right-bank and left-bank branches, respectively) for their services. Csépán died without descendants sometime before 1292. Following his death, his fort at Rohonc was seized by Nicholas Kőszegi, while the castles of Szentmihály and Monyorókerék became royal strongholds again.

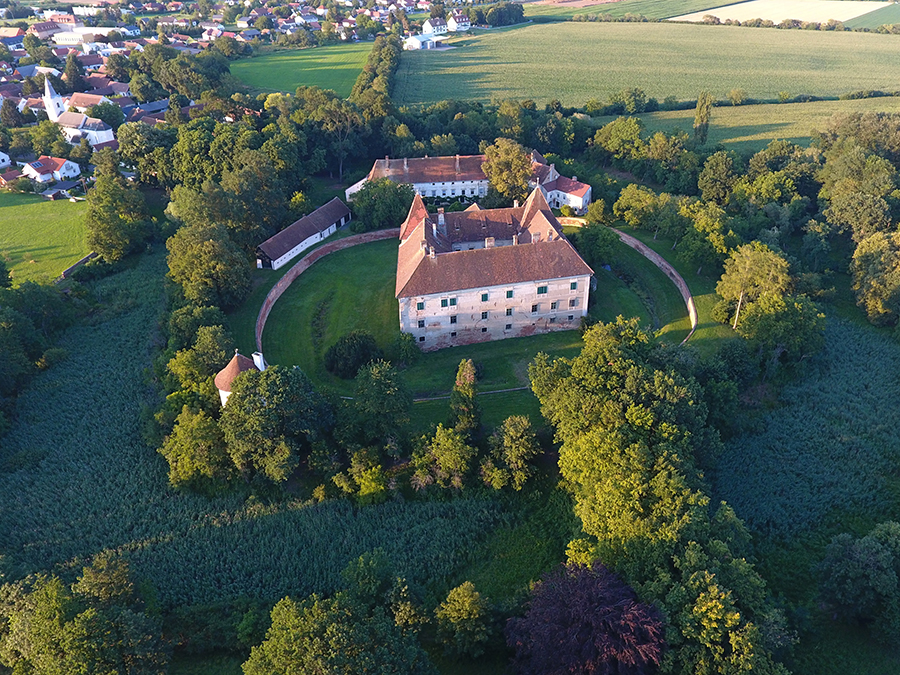
The fort of Eberau (Monyorókerék)

Of the three sons of Martin (II), only the name of Mika (II) appears in later sources. He was involved in the internal conflicts which characterized the era of feudal anarchy in the 1270s. As a partisan of Palatine Peter Csák, he captured the "disloyal" Demetrius Inkei – an ally of Joachim Gutkeled – near Istvánd in January 1276, when an armed conflict broke out between the two factions in Zala County. After the execution of Demetrius, King Ladislaus IV, confiscating it from the latter's brothers, donated his estate Inke in Somogy County to Mika (II). He immediately sold the landholding for 20 marks to Gregory, son of Iharos in January 1276. He sold his portion in Oltárc to Atyusz Hahót in 1289. He bequeathed a part of his estate in Gyűrűs to his wife, Yolanda Hahót in 1292, in exchange for her dowry. Not long before his death, he also sold his portion in Véged to the Endrédi family. The Sitkeis (from the Jáks' right-bank branch), who possessed the other half of the village, had a long legal battle over Mika's inheritance. With his death in the 1290s, the senior branch of the Ják kindred became extinct.

James' branch did not play a significant role compared to Martin's descendants. Beyond the aforementioned 1259 consent to the donation of Dabrapatak, Stephen (II) is no longer mentioned. According to his charter from 1281, Bartholomew sold his village Paka in Valkó County for 70 marks to a certain Emeric, son of Athanasius. Bartholomew stated in his charter that he received the amount when he was "on embassy duty to the German monarch". Perhaps it is the same diplomatic mission when Denis, Bishop of Győr visited the court of King Rudolf on behalf of the Hungarian king at the turn of 1278–1279. He possessed the lordship of Nevna in 1281. It is plausible that Emeric, son of Tristan was a grandchild of either Stephen or Bartholomew. In 1310, he expressed his claim to Nevna before the collegiate chapter of Székesfehérvár.

Historian György Rácz outlined the history of the senior branch as follows: they were one of the most distinguished noble clans in the 12th-century Hungary, which is proven by archaeological excavations, the extent of their estates to several counties, and the high political positions of the first known individuals – Mika (I) and Csépán (I) – by the beginning of the 13th century. In the following decades, they were among the losers in the struggle for wealth and power. They gradually lost their political influence in the royal court during the reigns of Andrew II and Béla IV. Stephen's entry into the Cistercian order resulted in heavy financial losses, while the construction of the Ják abbey church by Martin (I) was an expensive project that exceeded the financial strength of the clan, which it could not turn into political gain. Zlaudus was unable to use his ecclesiastical career to the benefit of the family, because the circumstances of his appointment caused King Béla to resent him for the rest of his life. Although Csépán (II) somewhat regained the old glory of the family, but since he died without an heir, there was no continuation of this. From the 1270s onwards, the Kőszegis established an oligarchic province independent of royal power in western Transdanubia, primarily in the counties of Vas and Zala, which the surrounding noble families, including the Jáks, were unable to counterbalance.

Family tree

- N
  - Mika I (fl. 1198–1201; d. after 1202)
    - Csépán I (fl. 1206–1216; d. before 1221)
      - Stephen I (fl. 1219–1240)
  - Ivan (Jovan; d. before 1221)
    - Martin I ("the Great"; fl. 1215–1244; d. before 1256) → Rohonc sub-branch
      - Casimir (fl. 1257–1259)
        - Csépán II (fl. 1259–1282; d. before 1292)
      - Martin II (fl. 1257–1266)
        - John (fl. 1262–1266)
        - Martin III (fl. 1262–1266)
        - Mika II (fl. 1266–1292) ∞ Yolanda Hahót (fl. 1292)
      - Zlaudus (fl. 1226–1262†)
    - James (fl. 1221–1244; d. before 1259) → Nevna sub-branch
      - Stephen II (fl. 1259)
        - (?) Tristan
          - Emeric (fl. 1310)
      - Bartholomew (fl. 1259–1281)

=== Left-bank branch ===
By the beginning of the 13th century, they were the poorest branch, and in many cases their social status appears as royal servants. Their estates centered around Jákfa. In 1221, seven members of the branch – Tapasz (Kopasz), Ják, Ebed, Csuna, Gregory, Artuna and Pousa – were granted the royal estate Uraj by King Andrew II, because their relative Belse took part in the Hungarian-led Fifth Crusade in 1217–1218. The donation letter also narrated that when the king decided to return to Hungary, Gregory and Pousa from the branch were among the nobles who welcomed him in Tornou (present-day Veliko Tarnovo, Bulgaria). The senior branch tried to satisfy the possible claims of the left-bank branch when dividing the inheritance of the late Csépán (I). Martin (I) and James handed over their estate Köröselő to their nine distant relatives – Bartholomew, Ebed, Thomas, Csuna, Tapasz, Ják, Artuna, Gregory and Pousa – in 1221 after a lengthy legal dispute. The senior branch thus lost their possessions around Jákfa, becoming geographically separated from their poorer relatives. It is also possible that the senior branch – Martin and James – played a role in the left-bank branch receiving the aforementioned royal donation of Uraj, which settled the claims of the poorer branch.

The church of Jákfa stands on medieval foundations

In 1243, Ják and Martin from the left-bank branch were defeated in a duel by Bors during a lawsuit. They could not give satisfaction to the other party without alienating their property, and their entire clan was summoned to the presence of Judge royal Demetrius Csák to redeem their property. However, they negligently hesitated, and finally Tristan, Ebed, Artuna, Mika and Nicholas, forced by legal custom, appeared before him, and Ják and Martin were forced to sell the half of their lands Rabaolyachak, Lipárt and their portions laid near the abbey church in Ják for 15 marks. By the late 1240s, Tristan was the most prestigious member of the branch; he and his kinship were referred to as patrons of the Saint Michael church in Jákfa in 1249, when the Ják Abbey was granted ius magistratus (i.e. share from its annual income) over the church by Artolf, the Bishop of Győr after the intervention of Bishop Zlaudus. However, the election of priests remained the prerogative of Tristan and his family. Although the church of Jákfa was not a monastery, its building significantly exceeded the standards of the village churches in Hungary of the time, primarily in the design of its western facade. Tristan and his relatives lived in much more modest financial circumstances than the senior branch, but nevertheless they tried to build a more illustrious church than the average. The Benedictines of Ják and their patrons possibly provided financial and architectural assistance for this, for which they received the ius magistratus over Jákfa. As mentioned above, Martin (II) from the senior branch handed over the estate Dabrapatak in 1259 to Reynold, Mika, Tristan and Martin in exchange for renouncing all their claims to the inheritance of the late Csépán (I), which indicates that despite the agreement of 1221, the lawsuits did not cease between the two branches.

The Nicki, Kemény de Egerszeg and Gyórói (or Jáki) families descended from Ebed's sub-branch. His sons, Reynold, Kemény and Ják were embroiled in conflict with the notorious robber baron Panyit Hahót, who ousted them from their land both in 1266 and 1267, also preventing the on-site inspection of the royal judges. To avoid imprisonment, Panyit ceded Nick and some other lands in Somogy County to the brothers. However, Panyit's soldiers pestered and invaded the adjacent lands, and brutally massacred the local serf families. Among others, Ivánka, an officialis of Kemény was also ruthlessly murdered. Before the court of Stephen V in 1270, the Ebed sub-branch agreed on the amount of compensation with Panyit. When Ottokar II of Bohemia invaded Hungary in the spring of 1273, Reynold, Ják and Kemény's son, Kemény took part in the battle below the castle of Detrekő, where they had captured a Bohemian warrior. Ják also participated in the Battle on the Marchfeld in August 1278. Reynold, Ják and the latter's son Stephen were also present in the siege of Borostyánkő in 1284, when King Ladislaus IV unsuccessfully attempted to crush the Kőszegis' power in western Transdanubia. Since 1302, The history of the Ebed sub-branch was characterized by conflicts and agreements over various division contracts between the members. In 1327, the sons of Ják were granted Bánkfalva and Sebefalva (both laid in present-day Jákfa), while Reynold's sons received Egerszeg, Taszár, Kövesd and Kovácsi. In 1334, Kemény and his sons filed a lawsuit against Reynold's sons regarding the rights of possession over Uraj, Nick and Csősz. Following an agreement concluded in 1338, Kemény's sons were granted Egerszeg and Taszár – thus, they became ancestors of the Kemény de Egerszeg family –, while Reynold's sons – progenitors of the Nicki (Niczky) family – received Nick, Kovácsi and Kövesd. The Nickis were the only kinship from the Ják clan, who had later elevated into the upper nobility (in the 18th century). The Gyórói (or Jáki) family originated from Ják's sons.

The Terestyénfalvi and Szelestei families descended from Csuna's sub-branch. The aforementioned Tristan (son of Thomas) was patron of the Jákfa church in 1249. He bought two manors in Tapasz (near Jákfa) in 1260. He and his brothers handed over a portion in Köröselő to Ebed's sub-branch in 1267. He paid the two daughters of the late Tapasz (Kopasz) for their daughters' quarter. His residence, Terestyénfalva ("Tristan's Village"; present-day Terestyénfa, a northern borough of Jákfa) was named after him. The Terestyénfalvi family descended from him through one of his sons, John. Tristan's brothers were Thomas and Michael; the latter had also descendants until the late 14th century. The Szelestei family descended from Csuna (II), the brother of Thomas. This Csuna, alongside his relative Gregory, had a conflict with the royal folks of Vas Castle, which resulted a trial by ordeal in 1221, as the Regestrum Varadinense recorded. Csuna's son, Ivan was ancestor of the Szelesteis. He acquired Bökécs (today a borough of Uraiújfalu) in 1267. His offspring centered around Szeleste.

The Szentivánfalvi and Sándorfalvi families descended from Alexander's sub-branch. Artuna (son of Alexander) paid the dowry of the late Tapasz's widow in 1250. His son Martin was involved in a lawsuit over a watermill at Rábca against the castle warriors of Vasvár in 1257. The court ruled in his favor. During a conflict within the family members, he was murdered in 1279. The Szentivánfalvi family descended from Martin's brother James. They centered around Szentivánfalva (today Szentivánfa, a borough of Uraiújfalu). Alexander (son of Gregory) was progenitor of the Sándorfalvi family. In 1260, he agreed to the sale of the manor houses in Tapasz. He pledged his estate Köröselő in 1265. He was involved in a lawsuit against Martin over a mill in 1269, but they had reconciled. He pledged another estate, which he had acquired after Csépán's punishment in 1280.

In addition to the above-mentioned branches, there were branches from which noble families did not emerge due to extinction. In 1240, Tapasz complained against influential baron File Szeretvai, who was granted an estate in Szeleste by a royal donation, together with members from the right-bank branch (see below). Tapasz died without male descendants around 1248. The payment of his widow's dower was met with difficulties by her relatives, and even in 1270 the lawsuit against Tapasz's daughters over certain servants was still ongoing. After his appearance in 1221, Ják is next mentioned in 1240, when he acted as pristaldus of the cathedral chapter of Vasvár during a lawsuit regarding the estate Kenéz. His son was Mika, who bought two manors in Tapasz in 1260. In 1265, his cousins, Csépán and Uz (sons of Pousa) pledged their portion in Köröselő to Mika. Together with Artuna and Tristan, Mika paid the two daughters of the late Tapasz (Kopasz) for their daughters' quarter. He also returned some servants to them in 1270. He was involved in a lawsuit with the right-bank branch around 1275. He died without male descendants in 1279; his estates were inherited by his cousin Csépán. The latter forcibly acquired all of the late Mika's assets and took part in the murder of his cousin Martin (son of Artuna) in 1279. As a result, members of the Ják kindred expelled him from their ranks, forbidding him from using the name of the clan. After their reconciliation, Csépán handed over his portions in Jákfa and Dabrapatak to Martin's widow and sons. Csépán was a familiaris of Csépán (II) from the clan's senior branch. Bartholomew had two sons, Nicholas and Daniel. Nicholas sold his four manors in Tapasz to Tristan and Mika (two each for both of them) in 1260. He also sold his portion in Köröselő sometime before 1265. During a conflict, he caused an injury to Mika; as a compensation, he handed over his estate Bökécs. Ivan (son of Csuna) bought that portion in 1267.

By the 1280s, the Kőszegi family had extended its influence over the entire region. When Csépán (II) of the senior branch died, the left-bank branch fell from the inheritance, and the Kőszegis occupied his castle, Rohonc. They also acquired Uraj, where Henry Kőszegi had illegally settled serfs, thus founding the settlement of Újfalu. In 1329, Nicholas II Kőszegi gave Uraj and Nick to certain members of the Jáks in exchange for Rohonc and the surrounding villages. The Jáks thus essentially received their own estates in exchange for their own estates, thus forcing them to acknowledge the Kőszegis' decades-long illegal acquisition of their lands. Since the late 1320s, after an agreement with the Sitkeis from the clan's right-bank branch, the ancestors of the Szelestei, Szentivánfalvi, Terestyénfalvi and Nicki families acquired the right of patronage over the Ják Abbey. They tried to acquire the abbey's estates in Ják and appropriate the tithes and other income for their own account. In 1333, leading members of the left-bank branch concluded an agreement that they had free disposal over all their estates, both those that had once been in the possession of the extincted senior branch, and those acquired in other ways. The 14th century was marked by conflict between the aforementioned families and the monastery over the estates in Ják and the surrounding settlements. In practice, these families did not patronize the monastery (to which they felt no spiritual attachment due to the change in the religiosity of the nobility, since it was founded by the extinct senior branch), which by the mid-15th century was among the poorest paid abbeys. Several records have survived of the persecution and harassment of monks by them. After officially abandoning their claim, the rich Ellerbach de Monyorókerék family received the patronage over Pornó and Ják abbeys in 1457.

Family tree

- N
  - N
    - N
      - Bartholomew (fl. 1221)
        - Nicholas (fl. 1243–1267)
        - Daniel (fl. 1267)
      - Ebed (fl. 1221–1243)
        - Benedict
          - Mika (fl.1270–1290)
          - Denis (fl. 1270–1274)
          - Roland (fl. 1270)
        - Reynold (fl. 1259–1302)
          - James (fl. 1303–1343)
            - Dominic (fl. 1382)
          - Andrew (fl. 1303–1338)
            - Nicholas (fl. 1342–1366) → Nicki (Niczky) family
            - Stephen (fl. 1359–1375)
        - Kemény (fl. 1262–1270)
          - Kemény (fl. 1274–1338) ∞ Elis Szecsődi
            - Nicholas (fl. 1334–1360) → Kemény de Egerszeg family
            - Michael (fl. 1334–1390)
        - Ják (fl. 1263–1294)
          - Stephen (fl. 1284–1303)
          - Mika (fl. 1290–1303)
            - George (fl. 1339)
          - Peter (fl. 1302–1303)
          - Martin (fl. 1302–1352)
          - Michael (fl. 1302–1352)
          - Nicholas (fl. 1302–1303)
          - James (fl. 1302–1339)
          - Ják (fl. 1302–1303) → Gyórói, then Jáky de Gyóró family
          - a daughter (fl. 1289) ∞ Emeric Herény
        - Stephen
          - Sixtus (fl. 1270)
  - N
    - Csuna
      - Thomas (fl. 1221)
        - Tristan (fl. 1243–1287)
          - John (fl. 1279–1327) ∞ Margaret Lánci (fl. 1321) → Terestyénfalvi family
          - Alexius (fl. 1280–1327)
          - James (fl. 1314–1324)
            - Lucas (fl. 1333–1343)
            - Roland (fl. 1341–1355)
              - John "the Lame"
        - Thomas (fl. 1267–1270)
          - Michael (fl. 1290–1294)
        - Michael (fl. 1267–1279)
          - John (Ivan; 1316–1343)
            - Nicholas (fl. 1341–1354)
              - Peter (fl. 1377)
              - James (fl. 1377)
              - John (fl. 1377)
      - Csuna (fl. 1221–1247)
        - Ivan (fl. 1256–1287)
          - Martin (fl. 1318)
            - James (fl. 1324–1335) → Szelestei (Szelestey) and Tibold de Szeleste family
          - James (fl. 1318–1341) ∞ Elizabeth N
            - Peter (fl. 1342–1352)
            - John (fl. 1342)
              - Dorothea (fl. 1404)
          - Paul (fl. 1318–1352) ∞ Helena N
            - Elizabeth (fl. 1387–1399) ∞ Emeric Simonyi (fl. 1387)
            - Helena (fl. 1350–1404) ∞ (1) Békés Polányi, (2) Marcellus Hermáni (fl. 1350)
    - N
      - Tapasz (Kopasz; fl. 1221–c. 1248)
        - a daughter (fl. 1270) ∞ Zuna Geresdi
        - a daughter (fl. 1270) ∞ Denis Hetyesomlyai
      - Ják (fl. 1221–1247)
        - Mika (fl. 1243–1279†)
      - Martin (fl. 1243)
    - Alexander
      - Artuna (fl. 1221–1250)
        - Martin (fl. 1257–1279†) ∞ Floris N
          - John (fl. 1279–1312)
            - John (fl. 1329–1377)
              - Stephen (fl. 1377)
                - Elizabeth (fl. 1382)
              - Francis (fl. 1362–1388)
          - Stephen (fl. 1279)
          - James (fl. 1279–1333) → Szentivánfalvi family
      - Gregory (fl. 1218–1221)
        - Alexander (fl. 1260–1280) → Sándorfalvi family
      - Pousa (fl. 1221)
        - Csépán (fl. 1265–1287)
        - Uz (fl. 1265)

=== Right-bank branch ===
In 1211, brothers Lawrence and Chama, and their relatives Paul and Benqua entered into a property division agreement with each other regarding their estates in Temes, Bodrog and Csanád counties in Eastern Hungary. While the former two were granted Háromfa, Tökörcs in Bodrog County and three estates in Temes County, also retaining their portions in Vas County, the latter received Karjad in Bodrog County and Agárd (near Padé) in Csanád County. Most of these estates located in Eastern Hungary were destroyed in the later decades, especially during the Mongol invasion, and are no longer mentioned in the hands of the clan.

The Sitkei (Sitkey), Gétyei (Gétyey) and Ölbői (Ölbey) families, which remained landowners in Western Transdanubia, descended from this branch, but the degree of the relationship between them is now uncertain. The aforementioned Lawrence, whose parentage is unknown, was the ancestor of the Sitkei family. He had four sons, Marcellus, Alexander, Csépán and Szabolcs. Alexander was involved in a lawsuit over his estate Tokorcs in Vas County against royal udvornici in Borostyán in 1237; Gregory, the bishop of Győr, on behalf of the king, ruled in favour of Alexander. The brothers lived in the eponymous Sitke in 1251. In that year, Saul from the gens Lőrinte paid the dower to his sister-in-law Margaret Sitkei (daughter of Marcellus), who was Lőrinte's widow, and to her second husband Ded Pok following a lawsuit before Zlaudus Ják. In 1271, Vulfet, the daughter of a certain Olber and widow of Marcellus, waived the payment of her dower to her brothers-in-law, Alexander and Csépán, in addition to Stephen (son of Szabolcs) in her last will and testament. Vulfet's father Olber constructed and possessed the fort of present-day Olbendorf (Óbér). Alexander and Csépán were involved in a lawsuit over the land Tokorcs against the royal udvornici in 1272, during which the court again ruled in their favor. These two are the ancestors of the Sitkei (Sitkey) family.

The coat-of-arms of Sitke still preserves the symbol of the Sitkeis

The elder Sebe (brother of Lawrence) acted as an arbiter on behalf of the Újlak branch of the Csák clan in 1240. His sons, Stephen and Nicholas possessed portions in Tokorcs around 1274. Stephen died before 1289. Nicholas bequeathed his lands Jákfa and Köröselő to John from the clan's Terestyénfalva branch in 1291. Csépán, his nephews Lawrence (son of Alexander) and Sebe (son of Szabolcs) were involved in a lengthy lawsuit against the left-bank branch over the heritage of the aforementioned Stephen and Nicholas (sons of the elder Sebe), both died without male descendants at the turn of the 1280s–1290s. The lawsuit continued into the 1320s, involving subsequent generations. Lawrence (II) acted as an arbiter in lawsuits in 1317 and 1321. His son Kopasz entered the service of Charles I of Hungary and participated in the monarch's unification war against the oligarchs, especially the Kőszegi family. Kopasz was adopted by a maternal relative, Dominic Vinári in 1323 (see below) and became heir to the lands Vinár in Veszprém County and Szergény in Vas County. Leucus was a squire and courtier of Queen Elizabeth; a branch of the Sitkeis descended from him. Emeric served as an official of Roland Rátót, ispán of Vas County. Stephen (son of Csépán) was a royal squire; he was forefather of the other branch of the Sitkei family. They all participated in the royal sieges of Kőszeg and Sárvás in 1327 against the rebellious Kőszegis and Babonići. This branch made a long effort to acquire the estates of the extinct senior branch in the first half of the 14th century. For instance, they regained Véged in 1325 (however, they had to buy back from the Endrédi family the portion that had been sold to them). Beside the aforementioned estates, they also owned Bajt (present-day an uninhabited borough of Sárvár). Kopasz and his kinship expressed their right to be patrons of Pornó and Ják abbeys, according to a royal charter from 1325. They were successful in their endeavor, citing their kinship with the founders. After more than a hundred years, the Pornó Abbey returned to the hands of the Ják clan, which reflected the social and political rise of the Sitkei family. The right of patronage, however, not implemented in practice, the abbots acted independently in the following years. They also attempted to recover the fort of Szentmihály and its lordship for themselves, but they were not successful in this. In 1326, the king removed the Sitkeis from the jurisdiction of the ispáns, and only the royal and palatinal courts could judge them in matters concerning their estates in Vas and Veszprém counties.

The ancestors of the Gétyei (Gétyey) family lived in Gétye in Zala County. Brothers Zuda (Csoda) and Abraham were involved in a lawsuit over Szeleste in 1240. In the same year, Zuda also acted as an arbiter on behalf of the Csáks in a trial over Kenéz. Abraham's son, Baksa fought in the army of ispán Amadeus Gutkeled during the Bohemian–Hungarian War in 1273, when he took part in defending the western border region against the invaders sent by Ottokar II of Bohemia. He was wounded during the skirmishes, but, despite that, he was present during the siege of Győr too. Therefore King Ladislaus IV of Hungary donated him and other neighboring nobles, who fought in the war, the estate of Battyán in Vas County, which had previously been the property of the royal cupbearers. The king ordered that the estate be divided into two, the southern part going to Baksa, while the northern part would go to the others. Sometime after 1282, Csépán (II) from the senior branch, who was ailing and made a last will and testament, bequeathed his estates Sömjén (Rábasömjén), Gyöngyöstő (present-day both are boroughs of Sárvár) and Véged to Baksa and another Csépán, son of Pousa for their services. Consequently, Baksa served as his familiaris in the 1280s. Baksa's son, Abraham sold his portion in Ölbő (near Sárvár) to Ivan Kőszegi prior to 1288. He was also involved in the lawsuit over the heritage of Sebe's sons in the late 1280s and early 1290s, as well as his second cousins Beke and Paul. Abraham pledged his estate Damonya in 1294. He died without male descendants by the end of the 13th century. Beke sold his estate Baksafölde laid near Sitke and Mesteri in 1300. His sons, John and Monkus, handed over their right over Véged and Gyűrűs to Stephen Sitkei in 1345. They were in dispute against the Osl kindred in 1348. The Gétyeis descended from them. Their sister Elizabeth married Dominic Vinári. They marriage produced a daughter Catherine. After the death of Dominic around 1323, both Elizabeth and Catherine renounced their dower because Dominic made Kopasz from the Sitke branch his heir while he was still alive.

The Ölbői (Ölbey) family also descended from this branch. They became owners of Ölbő in 1288, when the five sons of Zoch (I) handed over their portions in Sömjén to Ivan Kőszegi, in exchange for that land. They and their cousins (see family tree) were also involved in the lawsuit over the heritage of Sebe's branch in late 1280s and early 1290s. Nicholas and Paul owned portions in Szeleste in 1327. Nicholas acted as an arbiter in the trial between the Szelestei family and the local nobles of Magyarszeleste. Denis handed over his right over Véged and Gyűrűs to Stephen Sitkei in 1345.

Family tree

- N
  - N
    - Lawrence (fl. 1211–1238)
      - Szabolcs (fl. 1268; d. before 1271)
        - Stephen (fl. 1271)
        - Sebe (fl. 1289–1322)
      - Marcellus (fl. 1237–1251) ∞ Vulfet N (fl. 1271)
        - Margaret (fl. 1251) ∞ (1) Lőrinte I Lőrinte, (2) Ded Pok
      - Alexander (fl. 1237–1272)
        - Lawrence (fl. 1289–1322)
          - Kopasz (fl. 1294–1327)
          - Emeric (fl. 1323–1339)
          - Leucus (fl. 1323–1378) → Sitkei (Sitkey) de Kissitke family
          - John (fl. 1323–1326)
      - Csépán (fl. 1271–1289)
        - Stephen (fl. 1322–1367) → Sitkei (Sitkey) de Nagysitke family
        - Margaret ∞ (1) Isaac N, (2) Egidius Káldi
    - Chama (fl. 1211)
    - Sebe (fl. 1240)
      - Stephen (fl. 1274; d. before 1289)
        - Kinga (fl. 1290)
      - Nicholas (fl. 1274–1291)
  - N
    - Zuda (fl. 1240)
      - Paul
        - Beke (fl. 1288–1304)
          - John (fl. 1323–1348) → Gétyei (Gétyey) family
          - Monkus (fl. 1345–1348)
          - Elizabeth (fl. 1323) ∞ Dominic Vinári
        - Paul (fl. 1288–1313)
    - Abraham (fl. 1240)
      - Baksa (fl. 1273–1275)
        - Abraham (fl. 1288–1294)
  - N
    - N
      - Zoch
        - Nicholas (fl. 1288–1330)
          - Leucus (or Lawrence; fl. 1345–1360) → Ölbői (Ölbey, Eölbey) family
        - Paul (fl. 1288–1328)
          - Peter (fl. 1339)
            - Nicholas (fl. 1339–1364)
        - Beke (fl. 1290)
        - Denis (fl. 1288–1345)
        - Zoch (fl. 1288–1294)
      - Ladislaus
        - Martin (fl. 1288–1294)
        - Paul (fl. 1288–1294)
      - Denis
        - Ladislaus (fl. 1288–1294)

== Sources ==
=== Primary sources ===
- Simon of Kéza: The Deeds of the Hungarians (Edited and translated by László Veszprémy and Frank Schaer with a study by Jenő Szűcs) (1999). CEU Press. ISBN 963-9116-31-9.
- Bak, János M.; Veszprémy, László; Kersken, Norbert (2018). Chronica de gestis Hungarorum e codice picto saec. XIV [The Illuminated Chronicle: Chronicle of the deeds of the Hungarians from the fourteenth-century illuminated codex]. Budapest: Central European University Press. ISBN 978-9-6338-6264-3.

=== Secondary sources ===
- Almási, Tibor (1994). "Ják nem [Genus Ják]". In Kristó, Gyula; Engel, Pál; Makk, Ferenc (eds.). Korai magyar történeti lexikon (9-14. század) [Encyclopedia of the Early Hungarian History (9th-14th centuries)] (in Hungarian). Akadémiai Kiadó. p. 299. ISBN 963-05-6722-9.
- Engel, Pál (1996). Magyarország világi archontológiája, 1301–1457, I. [Secular Archontology of Hungary, 1301–1457, Volume I] (in Hungarian). História, MTA Történettudományi Intézete. ISBN 963-8312-44-0.
- F. Romhányi, Beatrix (2000). Kolostorok és társaskáptalanok a középkori Magyarországon: Katalógus [Monasteries and Collegiate Chapters in Medieval Hungary: A Catalogue] (in Hungarian). Pytheas. ISBN 963-7483-07-1.
- Györffy, György (2013). István király és műve [King Stephen and his work] (in Hungarian). Balassi Kiadó. ISBN 978-963-506-896-8.
- Karácsonyi, János (1900). A magyar nemzetségek a XIV. század közepéig. [The Hungarian genera until the middle of the 14th century] (in Hungarian). Hungarian Academy of Sciences.
- Markó, László (2006). A magyar állam főméltóságai Szent Istvántól napjainkig: Életrajzi Lexikon [Great Officers of State in Hungary from King Saint Stephen to Our Days: A Biographical Encyclopedia] (in Hungarian). Helikon Kiadó. ISBN 963-208-970-7.
- Mályusz, Elemér (1971). Az V. István-kori geszta [The Gesta of the Age of Stephen V]. Akadémiai Kiadó.
- Rácz, György (2022). A jáki apátság és kegyurai a középkorban [The Abbey of Ják and its Patrons in the Middle Ages] (in Hungarian). National Archives of Hungary. ISBN 978-963-631-308-1.
- Zsoldos, Attila (2011). Magyarország világi archontológiája, 1000–1301 [Secular Archontology of Hungary, 1000–1301] (in Hungarian). História, MTA Történettudományi Intézete. ISBN 978-963-9627-38-3.
- Zsoldos, Attila (2022). Az Aranybulla királya [The King of the Golden Bull] (in Hungarian). Városi Levéltár és Kutatóintézet. ISBN 978-963-8406-26-2.
