= Csépán II Ják =

Hungarian lord

Csépán (II) Ják

Master of the cupbearers
- Reign: 1274–1275
- Predecessor: Nicholas Pok
- Successor: Peter
- Born: c. 1230
- Died: after 1282
- Noble family: gens Ják
- Father: Casimir

Csépán (II) from the kindred Ják (Hungarian: Ják nembeli (II.) Csépán; died after 1282) was a Hungarian medieval lord and soldier in the 13th century, who served as Master of the cupbearers from 1274 to 1275. He actively participated in the defense of the western border during the Bohemian invasions into Hungary in the early 1270s.

== Early life ==
Csépán (Chepan) was born in the 1230s into the senior branch of the influential gens (clan) Ják, which possessed landholdings mainly in Vas and Zala counties in Western Transdanubia. His father was Casimir.

He is first mentioned in contemporary records in 1259, when his uncle Martin (II) – with the consent of him and other family members – handed over the estate Dabrapatak and paid 10 marks additionally to members of the clan's poorer left-bank branch, in exchange for renouncing all their claims to the inheritance of the late Ban Csépán (I). After the death of Bishop Zlaudus, then the most illustrious member of the kindred, in 1262, Csépán's uncle, Martin and his cousins refused to hand over his forts Tátika to the Diocese of Veszprém. They fell out of favor due to the conflict that arose. In November 1266, King Béla IV confiscated their villages Szántó, Nyirád, Szőc and Egerszeg and handed them over to the bishopric. The royal charter narrates that Csépán and his relative Bartholomew also contributed to the verdict. After the death of Zlaudus, Csépán possessed portions in Véged, Gyűrűs and Oltárc too. Despite Csépán had no role in the arbitrary seizure of Tátika and the diocesan treasures, he did not have any political influence at Béla's court. Thus, it is plausible that Csépán was a partisan of Béla's heir and rival, rex junior Stephen, but there is no record of his possible involvement in the 1260s interal conflict. He acted as an arbiter and co-judge in the lawsuit between Cletus Hahót and Jáks' left-bank branch (ancestors of the Nicki family) in 1267.

== Career ==
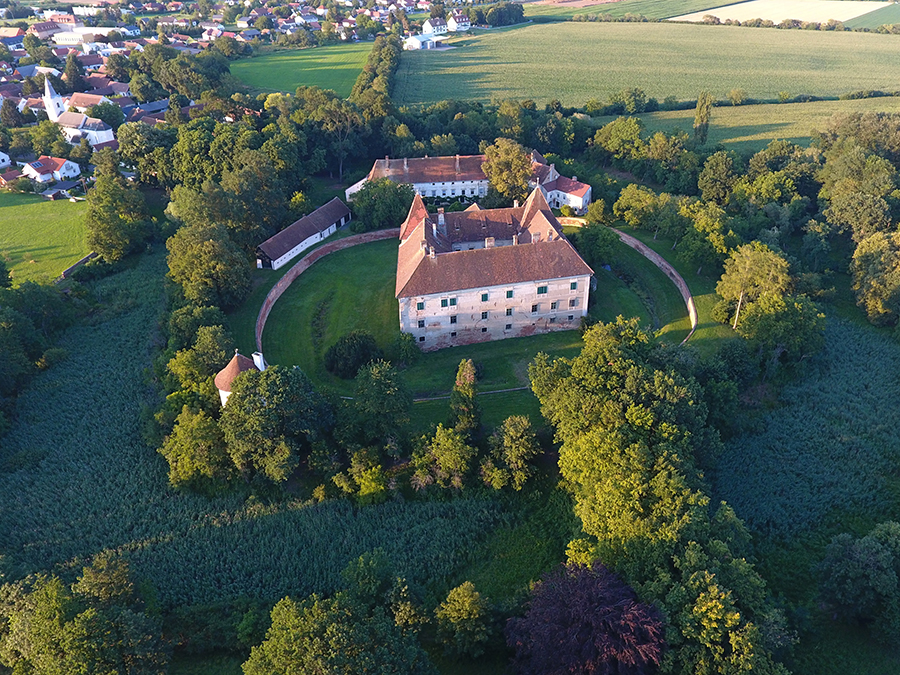
The fort of Eberau (Monyorókerék), possessed by Csépán Ják

Csépán rose to prominence during the reign of Stephen V, who ascended the Hungarian throne in 1270. Following a series or clashes along the western border, the king launched a plundering raid into Styria in December 1270. Csépán, as a member of the contingent commanded by ispán Gregory Monoszló, was present at the siege of Radkersburg (Regede) in the same month. There, he defeated and captured a valiant German warrior in a knightly duel, "thereby inspiring the others to fight". After King Ottokar II of Bohemia invaded Hungary in the spring of 1271, Csépán actively participated in the defense of the western border. He fought "with spears and arrows" at Mosonmagyaróvár on 15 May and the decisive victorious battle on the Rábca River on 21 May, where he sustained serious injuries. Following the conclusion of the Peace of Pressburg in early July 1271, Csépán was involved in that royal campaign commanded by ispán Gregory Monoszló, which successfully besieged and captured the traitor Henry Kőszegi's four castles – Kőszeg, Szalónak (Stadtschlaining), Szentvid and Borostyánkő – in Vas County.

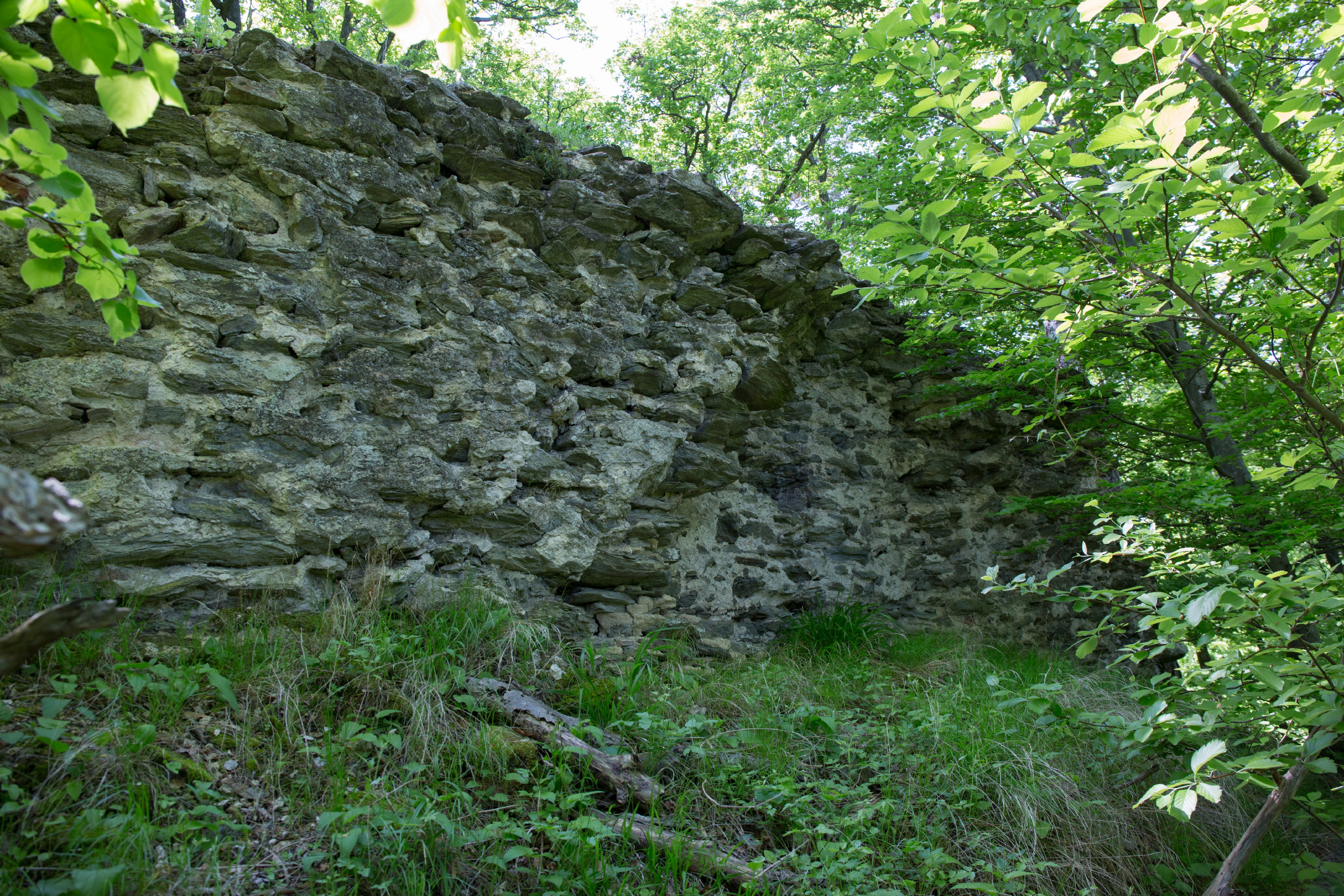
The ruins of the fort of Rechnitz (Rohonc), built and possessed by Csépán Ják until his death

Following the death of Stephen V in August 1272, Csépán remained a strong pillar of the royal power in Vas and Zala counties. He took part in defending the western border region, when Ottokar II sent troops to plunder the surrounding region, which affected mostly Slavonia and Vas County. In early 1273, Csépán took part in the Hungarian incursions into Austria, possibly as a member of the banderium led by ispán Amadeus Gutkeled. He was present at the siege of Fürstenfeld, where he "rushed ahead of everyone into the enemy battle line, heroically felling and killing a Styrian feudal lord with his spear". For his military service and loyalty, the minor King Ladislaus IV, with the "consent of the barons of the realm", granted the estates Szentmihály and Incéd (present-day Großpetersdorf and Dürnbach in Austria, respectively), along with a small fort, to Csépán in July 1273. The royal charter narrates that both villages would have been his own inheritance, because it was an inherited property of Csépán's ancestors, but it was unlawfully taken from them during the reign of King Béla IV.

During the era of feudal anarchy, when many groupings of barons fought against each other for supreme power, Csépán affiliated with the powerful and influential gens (clan) Csák. After they regained power from the Kőszegis, Csépán served as Master of the cupbearers from November 1274 to June 1275. He lost his position, when the Csáks' rivals regained their dominance over the royal council. Csépán functioned as ispán of Vas County twice, each times for a brief time in 1276 and 1279. Possibly via royal donation, Csépán acquired the lordship of Monyorókerék (present-day Eberau, Austria), which was once part of the Jáks' wealth. There, he also possessed the castle lay along the western border, which was presumably built by the Hungarian kings prior to that. Csépán constructed the castle of Rohonc (present-day Rechnitz, Austria) in his estate, which became his permanent residence.

In the summer of 1282, Csépán fought against the Cumans, who looted and pillaged the region between the rivers Tisza and Maros. It is possible that he also participated in the Battle of Lake Hód in September or October 1282. Sometime in the mid-1280s, Csépán, who was ailing and made a last will and testament, bequeathed his estates Sömjén (Rábasömjén), Gyöngyöstő (present-day both are boroughs of Sárvár) and Véged to his familiares Baksa and Csépán (from the Ják clan's right-bank and left-bank branches, respectively) for their services. Csépán died without descendants sometime before 1292. Following his death, his fort at Rohonc was seized by Nicholas Kőszegi, while the castles of Szentmihály and Monyorókerék became royal strongholds again.

== Sources ==
- Engel, Pál (1996). Magyarország világi archontológiája, 1301–1457, I. [Secular Archontology of Hungary, 1301–1457, Volume I] (in Hungarian). História, MTA Történettudományi Intézete. ISBN 963-8312-44-0.
- Karácsonyi, János (1900). A magyar nemzetségek a XIV. század közepéig. [The Hungarian genera until the middle of the 14th century] (in Hungarian). Hungarian Academy of Sciences.
- Kristó, Gyula, ed. (2000). Középkori históriák oklevelekben (1002–1410) [Medieval Stories in Charters (1002–1410)] (in Hungarian). Szegedi Középkorász Műhely. ISBN 963-482-423-4.
- Rácz, György (2022). A jáki apátság és kegyurai a középkorban [The Abbey of Ják and its Patrons in the Middle Ages] (in Hungarian). National Archives of Hungary. ISBN 978-963-631-308-1.
- Rudolf, Veronika (2023). Közép-Európa a hosszú 13. században [Central Europe in the Long 13th Century] (in Hungarian). Arpadiana XV., Research Centre for the Humanities. ISBN 978-963-416-406-7.
- Zsoldos, Attila (2011). Magyarország világi archontológiája, 1000–1301 [Secular Archontology of Hungary, 1000–1301] (in Hungarian). História, MTA Történettudományi Intézete. ISBN 978-963-9627-38-3.

Csépán II Genus Ják Born: c. 1230 Died: 1282/1292
Political offices
Preceded by Nicholas Pok	Master of the cupbearers 1274–1275	Succeeded by Peter
