= Zlaudus Ják =

Hungarian bishop

Zlaudus
- Bishop of Veszprém
- Seal of Zlaudus Ják, 1256
- Province: Esztergom
- Diocese: Veszprém
- Installed: 1245
- Term ended: 1262
- Predecessor: Bartholomew
- Successor: Paul Balog
- Previous posts: Lector of Székesfehérvár; Provost of Pressburg

Personal details
- Born: c. 1200
- Died: 1262 Tátika Castle, near Zalaszántó, Kingdom of Hungary
- Denomination: Roman Catholic
- Parents: Martin Ják

Zlaudus from the kindred Ják (Hungarian: Ják nembeli Zlaudus; died 1262) was a Hungarian prelate in the 13th century, who served as bishop of Veszprém from 1245 to his death. He functioned as chancellor of the queen's court for a short time in 1226.

== Life and career ==
=== Family background ===
Zlaudus (also Zelandus, Zeland or Zaland) was born around 1200 into the influential gens (clan) Ják, which possessed landholdings mainly in Vas County in Western Transdanubia, but also had estates in other areas of the Kingdom of Hungary. His father was Martin (I), the ispán of Vas County, who founded the Benedictine abbey of Ják. Zlaudus had two elder brothers, Casimir and Martin (II). The name Zlaudus is of unknown origin.

The Hungarian historiography previously mistakenly linked his person to the so-called Transdanubian (actually fabricated) branch of the gens (clan) Kaplon. The root of this error is the genealogical work of János Karácsonyi from 1900, which is based on the 1236 document (see below) in which Zlaudus bought Szántó from John Kaplon (son of Andronicus) from his clan's Terebes branch. The charter states that Zlaudus and John "come from the same kindred" ("de uno sunt genere"). Despite historian Ubul Kállay already in 1915 noticed identity between the Jáks' senior branch and the Transdanubian branch of the Kaplon clan (which was also accepted by Karácsonyi), the Hungarian historiography attached Zlaudus and his entire kinship to the Kaplon kindred almost unanimously (the only exception is Károly Ruzsa). Historian György Rácz proved that the future bishop belonged to the prestigious Ják clan. Plausibly, the two noblemen were related through in-laws or maternal side.

=== Early career ===
Zlaudus entered ecclesiastical career. He held the title of magister, which reflects his literacy and university studies. He had been lector of the collegiate chapter of Székesfehérvár from 1226 to 1239. Beside that, he was styled as chancellor in the court of Queen Yolanda of Courtenay in 1226. It is likely that he served in this position for only a brief time.

Seal of Zlaudus, depicting Saint George and the Dragon, from 1237

Prior to March 1236, as mentioned above, Zlaudus bought the estate Szántó in Zala County from his maternal relative, John Kaplon for 110 silver marks. However, the boundaries of the purchased estate were not recognized by the neighboring udvornici, who therefore destroyed the boundary stones marking them, which escalated into litigation. In late 1236, Palatine Denis Tomaj ruled in favor of Zlaudus, which judgement was confirmed King Béla IV in 1239. The udvornici of Ecser attempted to re-open the case several times in the following decades, therefore both Zlaudus and John confirmed their contract in 1251 before the collegiate chapter of Székesfehérvár, requesting its confirmation. After Béla IV ascended the Hungarian throne in 1235, Zlaudus was involved in that investigation committee led by Bartholomew, Bishop of Veszprém in 1236–1237, which supervised and sometimes overruled previous land grants occurred in Zala County. His seal, which is the earliest known depiction of Saint George with a dragon in Hungary, was preserved from 1237.

Zlaudus elevated into the position of provost of Pressburg by the time of the first Mongol invasion of Hungary in 1241–1242. Taking advantage of the anarchic conditions, a local landowner named Tátika, son of Tátika sacked and looted Zlaudus' estate Szántó, along with other possessions of the Diocese of Veszprém, causing causing 80 marks of damage to the provost. The litigation between Zlaudus and Tátika dragged on before the court of Palatine Ladislaus Kán, according to the charter which narrates the case. Consequently, Zlaudus served as provost of Pressburg until 1244 or 1245. The judicial court ruled in favor of Zlaudus; in return for the damage caused, three surrounding villages of Tátika – Botka, Pabar and Bozlog – were confiscated. However, when the officials intended to include Zlaudus as the new owner of these estates, supported by the royal warriors of Zala Castle, Tátika prevented this by force. His troops beat and chased away the royal troops. By 1244, Zlaudus also became a canon of the cathedral chapter of Veszprém.

=== Bishop of Veszprém ===
Bishop Bartholomew of Veszprém died in the early months of 1244. After a period of vacancy, Zlaudus was elected by the chapter as his successor in late 1244 or early 1245. The canons did not submit themselves to the usual procedure and did not wait for the king's proposal. In addition, Archbishop Stephen Báncsa confirmed his election shortly thereafter, but without the consent of King Béla IV. The monarch, who saw Stephen's action as a violation of his right of supreme patronage ("ius supremi patronatus") over church appointments, filed a complaint to the Roman Curia that Zlaudus' election and confirmation "contradicted the old customary law", referring for old Hungarian customs and the ancient rights of the monarch that had been recognized by the Holy See. In response, Pope Innocent IV instructed Archbishop Benedict of Kalocsa and the abbots of Pilis and Szentgotthárd to investigate the case in February 1245. Meanwhile, Béla did not recognize the election and ignored Zlaudus in the royal council; his charters refer to the Diocese of Veszprém "in vacancy" throughout 1245. Despite Béla's complaint, Zlaudus remained bishop. He is first mentioned in this capacity by royal charters in December 1245. The Hungarian king, who had no problem with Zlaudus personally, but with the procedure, could never forgive this, and his relationship with the Diocese of Veszprém remained strained throughout. For instance, Béla IV took the revenues of the churches in Buda away from the bishopric. He transferred the jurisdiction over the Provostry of Saint Peter and Paul to the Archdiocese of Esztergom too. Even decades later, at the end of his life, the king mentioned the "injustice" that had befallen him. Nevertheless, Béla donated the estate Csicsó to the Diocese of Veszprém in an unknown year for the merits of Zlaudus.

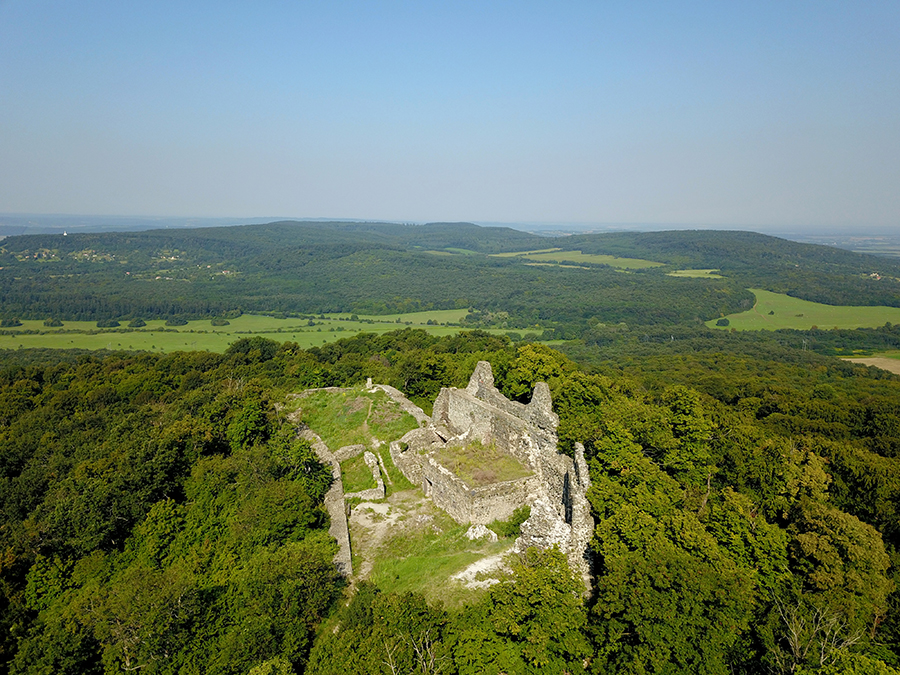
Tátika Castle near Zalaszántó, built by Zlaudus Ják between 1248 and 1257

Even as a bishop, Zlaudus' name most often appears in contemporary sources in property matters. Following the death of Tátika, Zlaudus continued his lawsuit against the latter's heirs, Gotalon and Nicholas. Around 1246 or 1247, Palatine Stephen Gutkeled forced them to hand over to Zlaudus the above-mentioned three villages – Botka, Pabar and Bozlog – awarded to him. In 1248, the bishop settled the conflict with the defendants before the court of Palatine Denis Türje. Accordingly, Zlaudus returned the three villages to Gotalon and Nicholas in exchange for the nearby hill called Várad (near his estate Szántó), which towered above the Tátikas' fort (i.e. lower castle). The compensation was awarded to Zlaudus personally, and not to the bishopric. Béla IV confirmed the verdict in 1251. Zlaudus built his castle called Tátika on top of the Várad (now Tátika) hill (i.e. upper castle) sometime between 1248 and 1257. That was one of the first private castles in the Kingdom of Hungary, which built after the Mongols' withdrawal. Zlaudus entrusted his brothers, Casimir and Martin (II) as castellans of the two forts called Tátika in the 1250s. Since the episcopal castle of Veszprém was not suitable for proper defense, Zlaudus transferred the bishopric's relics, treasures, charters and letters of privilege to his new castle. Beside Szántó and Tátika, Zlaudus also possessed Egerszeg, Véged, Gyűrűs, Nyirád, Szőc and Oltárc in Zala County.

It is possible that the Saint George chapel of the St. Michael's Cathedral in Veszprém was constructed by Zlaudus. Upon his request, the cathedral chapter of Veszprém replaced its portion of the church income tax, coming from its right of magistrate (ius magistratus), of several chapels in Zala County (Véged, Nyirád and Szántó) to an ordinary annual tax, and it completely (Rajk, Kozmadombja) or partially (Keszthely, Egerszeg and Bocfölde) exempted others from the aforementioned right in 1247. This decision meant significant financial relief for these chapels. For his diocese, he bought an estate and a mill in Veszprém from members of the gens (clan) Lád in 1258. Zlaudus generously financed the construction work of the Ják family monastery begun by his father. Under his influence, the Benedictine abbey was granted jurisdiction (ius magistratus) over the revenues of the Saint Michael church in Jákfa in 1249. After his father died around 1250, the construction was completed quickly and the Ják church was consecrated in 1256. Modeled after the Ják abbey church, Zlaudus also built a three-nave, three-apse, tower-paired church, dedicated to Saint George, in Véged. He constructed another church in Nyirád. Stone carvings were found in the current church whose style was similar to the decorations of the church in Ják.

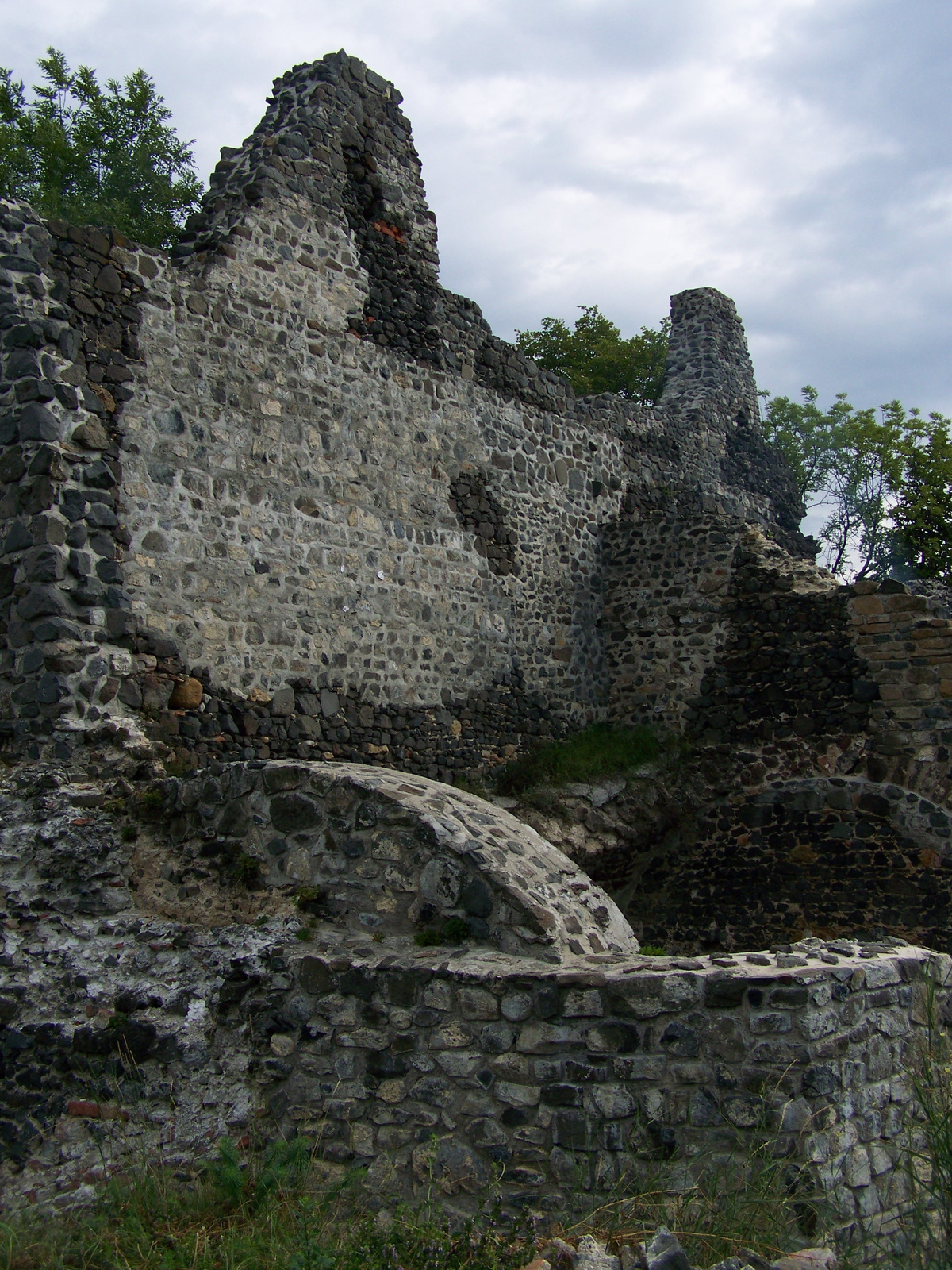
The ruins of Tátika Castle

During the episcopal tenure of Zlaudus, a chronicler and cleric named Ákos interpolated and supplemented the original Hungarian chronicle text. He erroneously named the 11th-century Bavarian knight Vecellin as forefather of the Ják clan. Hungarian historian György Rácz considered that Ákos' contemporary, Zlaudus was the driving force behind the chronicler's connection of Vecellin's person with the emerging noble kindred, to make their arrival to Hungary earlier than it actually happened. Accordingly, Zlaudus brought the family's existing Bavarian connections and the gradually developing cult of Saint George into harmony with the tradition surrounding Vecellin.

Under Zlaudus, the long-lasting conflict of jurisdiction continued between his bishopric and the Pannonhalma Abbey. He filed a complaint to the Roman Curia concerning the monastery's jurisdiction in certain villages (e.g. Tard) within the diocese. In September 1245, Pope Innocent IV delegated the provost of Győr and the abbot and prior of Zirc to judge in the matter. Zlaudus was also involved in another case, in which he accused the abbey of seizing and plundering certain chapels in his diocese. In August 1246, the pope instructed the abbot and prior of Pilis to investiage that complaint. Zlaudus himself also acted as papal judge-delegate on a few occasions. He was also involved in a series of trials with the abbot of Zalavár over the right of collection of tithes in the surrounding villages. In 1252, bishops Zlaudus and Heimo were mandated to implement the papal command concerning the appointment of Cardinal Stephen Báncsa as administrator of the Archdiocese of Esztergom. Prior to 1254, he ruled in favor of the local Benedictine monastery against the powerful lord Stephen Csák over the ownership of the village Tata. Despite his verdict, Stephen refused to return the settlement to the abbey until 1260. Zlaudus persistently tried to recover from the Premonstratensian provostry of Majk the twentieth of the tithes granted to them by the king. During the episcopal tenure of Zlaudus, the lower clergy of the diocese loudly expressed their dissatisfaction regarding their provision and the associated costs, a dispute that led to a lawsuit between the two parties before the Roman Curia in 1261. Ultimately, an agreement was reached whereby half of one-quarter of the tithe was to go to the chapter, and the other half to the parish priests.

The elderly Zlaudus, for his spiritual salvation, donated his estate Szántó and the two castles of Tátika with their accessories to the cathedral chapter of Veszprém in 1257, with the consent of his brothers, Casimir and Martin. The Hungarian king confirmed the donation in November in that year. Béla's charter emphasizes that the castle does not belong to his brothers anyway, because Zlaudus himself acquired it from Tátika for the annihilation of the peoples of the church (which, however, was an intentional misrepresentation on the part of the royal court, as Zlaudus received the territory due to personal damage). With this step, Zlaudus deprived his own clan of a valuable advantage in an era when possession of castles became one of the main pillars of political and economic power. Although it is possible that after his election as bishop, Zlaudus was only concerned with the church and his diocese, but, it is more likely that he did so not of his own free will, but under the influence of pressure exerted by King Béla. Zlaudus and his kindred were partisans of Duke Stephen, the king's heir, whose relationship with his father became increasingly strained from that time on. However, a significant part of their estates lay in the western part, in the core of Béla's realm.

== Death and aftermath ==
Zlaudus died in the upper castle of Tátika in 1262. In his last will and testament, he bequeathed 120 marks to the cathedral chapter of Veszprém. He was succeeded as bishop by Paul Balog.

Following Zlaudus' death, his brother Martin (II) and his nephews – John, Martin (III) and Mika (II) – refused to hand over the two castles to the bishopric. They had also seized the episcopal treasures together with all charters and letters of privilege and the holy relics belonging to the bishop's chapel (including a golden chalice donated by King Béla to the church of Veszprém) and the 120 marks mentioned above. To avoid prosecution, Martin and his sons fled to junior king Stephen's realm in the midst of the emerging civil war between father and son. No courts were able to enforce the convictions. Paul Balog filed a lawsuit against Martin and his sons in 1265–1266, after the reconciliation between Béla and Stephen. In November 1266, the Hungarian monarch, who wrongly claimed that Zlaudus received the hill of Tátika for the destruction of the episcopal estate Erek (laid near Sümeg), where the late bishop possessed an episcopal manor, ruled that they had to return the two Tátika castles, and in return for the damage caused worth 5400 marks of silver, they had to cede their villages of Szántó, Nyirád and Szőc to the bishopric. The royal charter narrates that the other living members of the Jáks' senior branch, Csépán (II) and Bartholomew also contributed to the verdict. It is known from the later development of the history of the estates that the royal court were able to enforce the judgment this time. In another document issued a few days later, Béla IV confiscated their another land Egerszeg from Martin and his sons, and donated it to the cathedral chapter as a compensation for the stolen golden chalice and 120 marks, also with the consent of Csépán and Bartholomew.

== Sources ==
- Ádám, Iván (1922). "Zelándus veszprémi püspök [Bishop Zlaudus of Veszprém]". Katolikus Szemle (in Hungarian). 36 (8–9): 460–469, 524–535. ISSN 0022-9431.
- Barabás, Gábor (2023). Delegated Papal Jurisdiction in Arpadian Hungary. Bishops – provosts – papal chaplains. Arpadiana XVI., Research Centre for the Humanities. ISBN 978-963-416-405-0.
- Gutheil, Jenő (1979). Az Árpád-kori Veszprém [Veszprém During the Age of Árpáds] (in Hungarian). Veszprém Megyei Levéltár. ISBN 9630111594.
- Karácsonyi, János (1900). A magyar nemzetségek a XIV. század közepéig. [The Hungarian genera until the middle of the 14th century] (in Hungarian). Hungarian Academy of Sciences.
- Markó, László (2006). A magyar állam főméltóságai Szent Istvántól napjainkig: Életrajzi Lexikon [Great Officers of State in Hungary from King Saint Stephen to Our Days: A Biographical Encyclopedia] (in Hungarian). Helikon Kiadó. ISBN 963-208-970-7.
- Rácz, György (1997). "Egerszeg első említése 1247-ből [The First Mention of Egerszeg from 1247]". In Kapiller, Imre (ed.). In: Zalaegerszeg évszázadai. Várostörténeti tanulmányok (in Hungarian). General Assembly of Zalaegerszeg. pp. 67–98. ISBN 963-03-4267-7.
- Rácz, György (2022). A jáki apátság és kegyurai a középkorban [The Abbey of Ják and its Patrons in the Middle Ages] (in Hungarian). National Archives of Hungary. ISBN 978-963-631-308-1.
- Szűcs, Jenő (1978). "A kereszténység belső politikuma a XIII. század derekán. IV. Béla király és az egyház [The Inner Politics of Christendom in the Middle of the 13th Century: King Béla IV and the Church]". Történelmi Szemle (in Hungarian). 21 (1). Hungarian Academy of Sciences: 158–181. ISSN 0040-9634.
- Varga, Béla (2009). Veszprém város lexikona [A Lexicon of the City of Veszprém] (in Hungarian). ISBN 978-963-06-7941-1.
- Zsoldos, Attila (2011). Magyarország világi archontológiája, 1000–1301 [Secular Archontology of Hungary, 1000–1301] (in Hungarian). História, MTA Történettudományi Intézete. ISBN 978-963-9627-38-3.

Zlaudus Genus Ják Born: c. 1200 Died: 1262
Political offices
| Preceded by Bartholomew | Chancellor of the Queen; 1226 | Succeeded by Philip Türje (?) |
Catholic Church titles
| Preceded by John | Provost of Pressburg c. 1241–1245 | Succeeded by Smaragd (?) |
| Preceded by Bartholomew | Bishop of Veszprém; 1245–1262 | Succeeded by Paul Balog |
