= Ölbő =

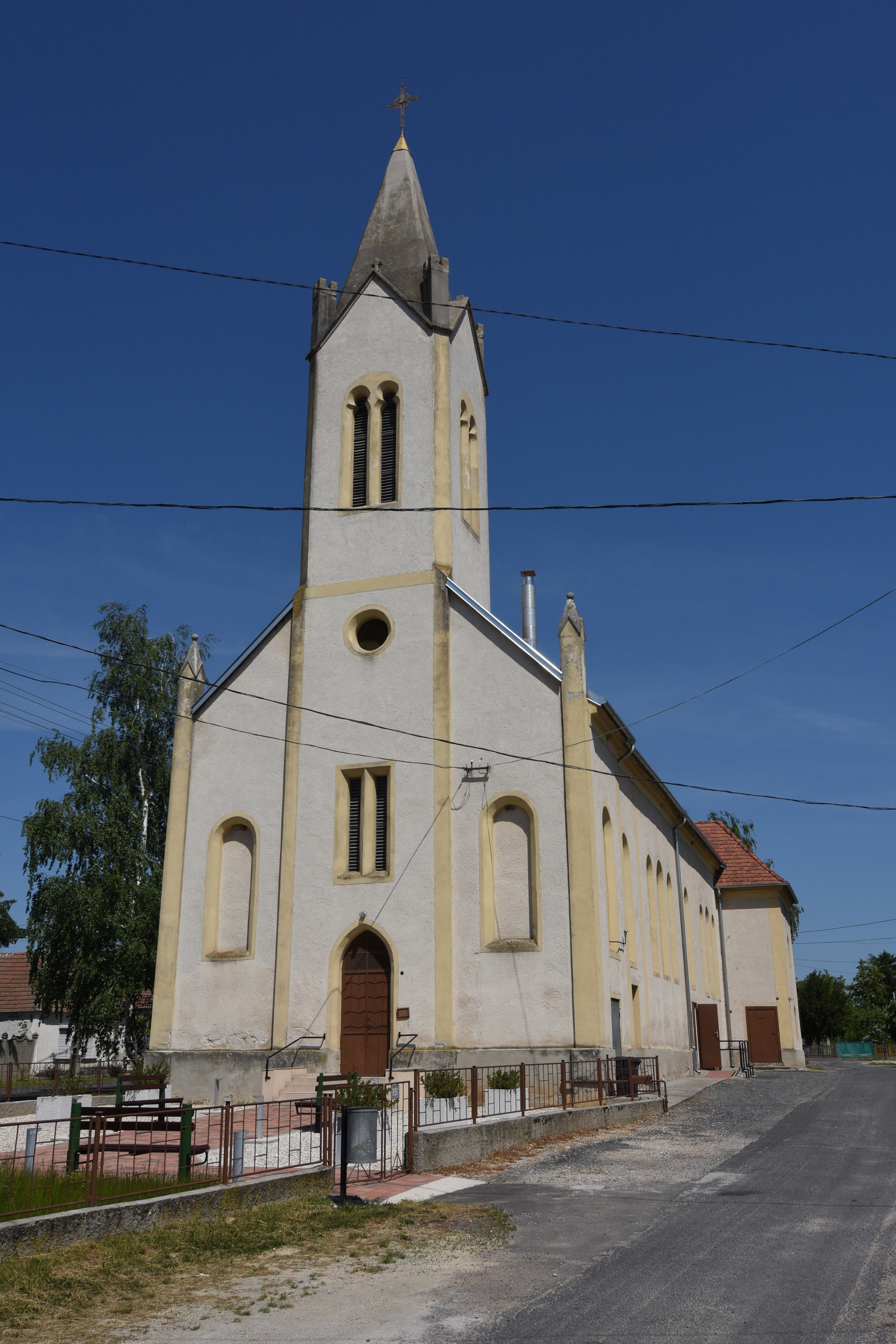
- Church of Ölbő

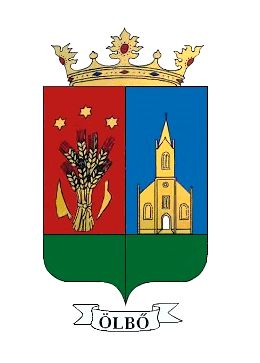
- Coat of arms

- Location of Ölbő in Hungary
- Coordinates: 47°18′1.19″N 16°51′33.48″E
- Country: Hungary
- Region: Western Transdanubia
- County: Vas
- Subregion: Sárvári
- Rank: Village

Area
  - Total: 23.53 km^{2} (9.08 sq mi)
- Time zone: UTC+1 (CET)
  - Summer (DST): UTC+2 (CEST)
- Postal code: 9621
- Area code: 95
- Website: https://olbo.hu/

Ölbő is a village in Vas county, Hungary.
