= Jákfa =

- Location of Vas county in Hungary

- Location of Jákfa
- Coordinates: 47.339521°N 16.955996°E
- Country: Hungary
- County: Vas

Area
  - Total: 7.85 km^{2} (3.03 sq mi)

Population (2025)
  - Total: 457
  - Density: 26.62/km^{2} (68.9/sq mi)
- Time zone: UTC+1 (CET)
  - Summer (DST): UTC+2 (CEST)
- Postal code: 9643
- Area code: 94

Jákfa is a village located in Vas County in western Hungary. It has an area of 20.11 km^{2} and a population of 457 (as of 2025). Jákfa is 35 km from Szombathely.

The settlement's name first appears in a document from 1211, but it may be of much earlier origin.

St. George's church, built in the 13th century by the Ják clan, as well as nearby St. James's chapel, are internationally recognized edifices of the late Romanesque style. The foundations of the clan's castle and donjon, erected in the period of the Árpád dynasty, have recently been uncovered and identified on the site of the former abbey. Several residences of the 18th and 19th centuries can be found in the village.

Ják was once famous for its potteries.

Gyula Gömbös lived in the village.
