= Sitke =

- Coat of arms

- Location of Vas county in Hungary

- Location of Sitke
- Coordinates: 47.24271°N 17.02470°E
- Country: Hungary
- County: Vas

Area
  - Total: 27.2 km^{2} (10.5 sq mi)

Population (2004)
  - Total: 678
  - Density: 24.92/km^{2} (64.5/sq mi)
- Time zone: UTC+1 (CET)
  - Summer (DST): UTC+2 (CEST)
- Postal code: 9671
- Area code: 95

Sitke is a village in Vas County, Hungary, 40 km from the county seat of Szombathely.

The first written documents of Sitke are the records from 1251, but some Roman remains refer to an even earlier date of origin.

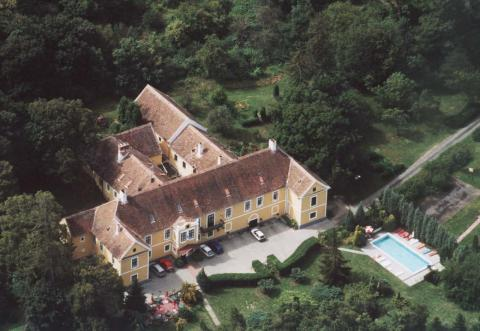
Sitke, castle from above

The manor of the Felsõbüki Nagy family was built on the slope near the settlement, originally in baroque style. Later, in 1851 it was rebuilt in romantic style.

After nationalization it would be a school for a long time, until in 1982 two families volunteered to have it renovated. It has been operating as a manor hotel since 1983.
