= Bernstein im Burgenland =

Bernstein
- Municipality
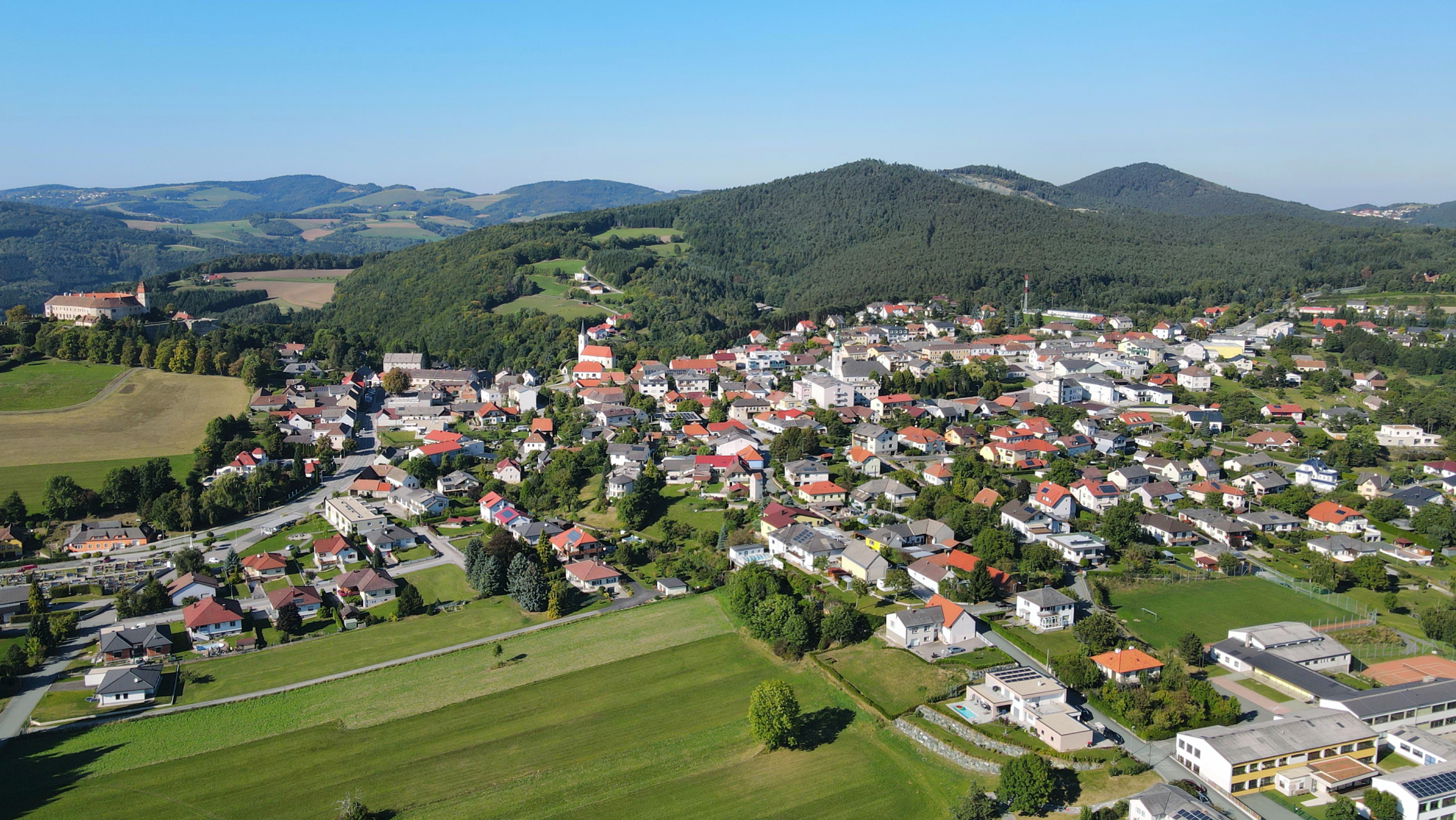
- Aerial view of Bernstein

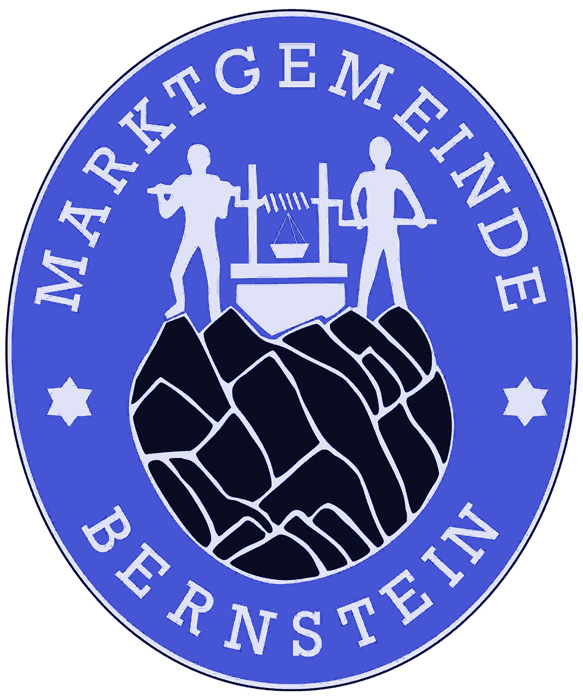
- Coat of arms

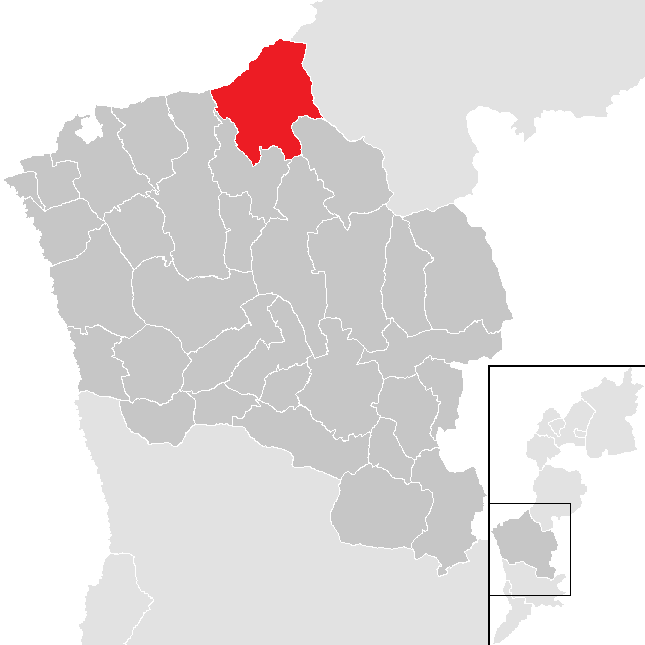
- Location within Oberwart district

- Location within Austria
- Coordinates: 47°24′N 16°15′E
- Country: Austria
- State: Burgenland
- District: Oberwart

Government
  - Mayor: Renate Habetler (SPÖ)

Area
  - Total: 38.99 km^{2} (15.05 sq mi)

Population (2018-01-01)
  - Total: 2,123
  - Density: 54.45/km^{2} (141.0/sq mi)
- Time zone: UTC+1 (CET)
  - Summer (DST): UTC+2 (CEST)
- Postal code: 7434
- Website: https://www.bernstein.gv.at/

Bernstein (Hungarian: Borostyánkő) is a municipality in Burgenland in the district Oberwart in Austria.

== Geography ==
Parts of the municipality are Dreihütten, Redlschlag, Rettenbach, and Stuben.

== Population ==
Historical population
Year	Pop.	±%
1869	2,896	—
1880	2,954	+2.0%
1890	2,921	−1.1%
1900	3,015	+3.2%
1910	2,909	−3.5%
1923	2,633	−9.5%
1934	2,690	+2.2%
1939	2,606	−3.1%
1951	2,465	−5.4%
1961	2,435	−1.2%
1971	2,470	+1.4%
1981	2,592	+4.9%
1991	2,493	−3.8%
2001	2,441	−2.1%
2011	2,267	−7.1%

== Politics ==
Of the 23 positions on the municipal council, the SPÖ has 14, and the ÖVP 9.

== Climate ==
Climate data for Bernstein im Burgenland (1981–2010)
Month	Jan	Feb	Mar	Apr	May	Jun	Jul	Aug	Sep	Oct	Nov	Dec	Year
Record high °C (°F)	16.0 (60.8)	19.2 (66.6)	22.5 (72.5)	25.3 (77.5)	29.7 (85.5)	34.0 (93.2)	34.6 (94.3)	35.2 (95.4)	30.0 (86.0)	23.9 (75.0)	20.9 (69.6)	17.0 (62.6)	35.2 (95.4)
Mean daily maximum °C (°F)	2.0 (35.6)	4.0 (39.2)	8.2 (46.8)	13.6 (56.5)	18.6 (65.5)	21.4 (70.5)	23.8 (74.8)	23.3 (73.9)	18.5 (65.3)	13.1 (55.6)	6.6 (43.9)	2.5 (36.5)	13.0 (55.4)
Daily mean °C (°F)	−2.0 (28.4)	−0.8 (30.6)	3.2 (37.8)	8.1 (46.6)	13.3 (55.9)	16.0 (60.8)	18.3 (64.9)	17.9 (64.2)	13.5 (56.3)	8.8 (47.8)	3.2 (37.8)	−0.9 (30.4)	8.2 (46.8)
Mean daily minimum °C (°F)	−3.8 (25.2)	−2.7 (27.1)	0.7 (33.3)	5.0 (41.0)	9.7 (49.5)	12.6 (54.7)	14.8 (58.6)	14.7 (58.5)	10.8 (51.4)	6.3 (43.3)	1.1 (34.0)	−2.8 (27.0)	5.5 (41.9)
Record low °C (°F)	−19.0 (−2.2)	−19.9 (−3.8)	−15.0 (5.0)	−6.5 (20.3)	0.0 (32.0)	2.7 (36.9)	6.0 (42.8)	4.7 (40.5)	2.5 (36.5)	−6.0 (21.2)	−11.8 (10.8)	−16.7 (1.9)	−19.9 (−3.8)
Average snowfall cm (inches)	16 (6.3)	20 (7.9)	20 (7.9)	6 (2.4)	0 (0)	0 (0)	0 (0)	0 (0)	0 (0)	1 (0.4)	13 (5.1)	21 (8.3)	96 (38)
Average relative humidity (%) (at 14:00)	71.1	61.8	57.9	52.7	55.7	58.0	55.1	56.5	61.0	66.6	73.7	74.8	62.1
Source: Central Institute for Meteorology and Geodynamics

Climate data for Bernstein im Burgenland (1971–2000)
Month	Jan	Feb	Mar	Apr	May	Jun	Jul	Aug	Sep	Oct	Nov	Dec	Year
Record high °C (°F)	16.0 (60.8)	19.2 (66.6)	23.0 (73.4)	25.3 (77.5)	28.3 (82.9)	34.0 (93.2)	33.5 (92.3)	34.0 (93.2)	30.0 (86.0)	23.3 (73.9)	20.4 (68.7)	16.6 (61.9)	34.0 (93.2)
Mean daily maximum °C (°F)	1.6 (34.9)	3.7 (38.7)	7.9 (46.2)	12.7 (54.9)	17.9 (64.2)	20.7 (69.3)	23.0 (73.4)	22.7 (72.9)	18.4 (65.1)	12.5 (54.5)	6.0 (42.8)	2.8 (37.0)	12.5 (54.5)
Daily mean °C (°F)	−1.7 (28.9)	−0.1 (31.8)	3.5 (38.3)	7.9 (46.2)	13.0 (55.4)	15.9 (60.6)	18.2 (64.8)	17.9 (64.2)	13.8 (56.8)	8.5 (47.3)	2.8 (37.0)	−0.3 (31.5)	8.3 (46.9)
Mean daily minimum °C (°F)	−4.2 (24.4)	−2.8 (27.0)	0.4 (32.7)	4.1 (39.4)	9.0 (48.2)	11.9 (53.4)	14.0 (57.2)	14.0 (57.2)	10.5 (50.9)	5.7 (42.3)	0.4 (32.7)	−2.7 (27.1)	5.0 (41.0)
Record low °C (°F)	−19.0 (−2.2)	−19.9 (−3.8)	−16.5 (2.3)	−5.4 (22.3)	−2.0 (28.4)	2.0 (35.6)	6.0 (42.8)	6.0 (42.8)	1.5 (34.7)	−4.7 (23.5)	−11.8 (10.8)	−16.7 (1.9)	−19.9 (−3.8)
Average precipitation mm (inches)	26.0 (1.02)	26.0 (1.02)	39.5 (1.56)	48.0 (1.89)	82.0 (3.23)	114.8 (4.52)	96.2 (3.79)	82.5 (3.25)	71.4 (2.81)	47.0 (1.85)	51.7 (2.04)	33.2 (1.31)	718.3 (28.28)
Average snowfall cm (inches)	16.3 (6.4)	19.0 (7.5)	24.9 (9.8)	8.3 (3.3)	0.0 (0.0)	0.0 (0.0)	0.0 (0.0)	0.0 (0.0)	0.0 (0.0)	0.2 (0.1)	13.4 (5.3)	21.3 (8.4)	103.4 (40.7)
Average precipitation days (≥ 1.0 mm)	4.9	5.0	7.3	7.6	9.6	10.1	9.4	8.7	6.7	6.1	7.9	5.8	89.1
Average relative humidity (%) (at 14:00)	73.8	65.0	60.1	55.4	57.3	58.9	57.0	57.7	62.3	66.4	73.2	74.1	63.4
Source: Central Institute for Meteorology and Geodynamics

== Sightseeing ==
- Bernstein Castle
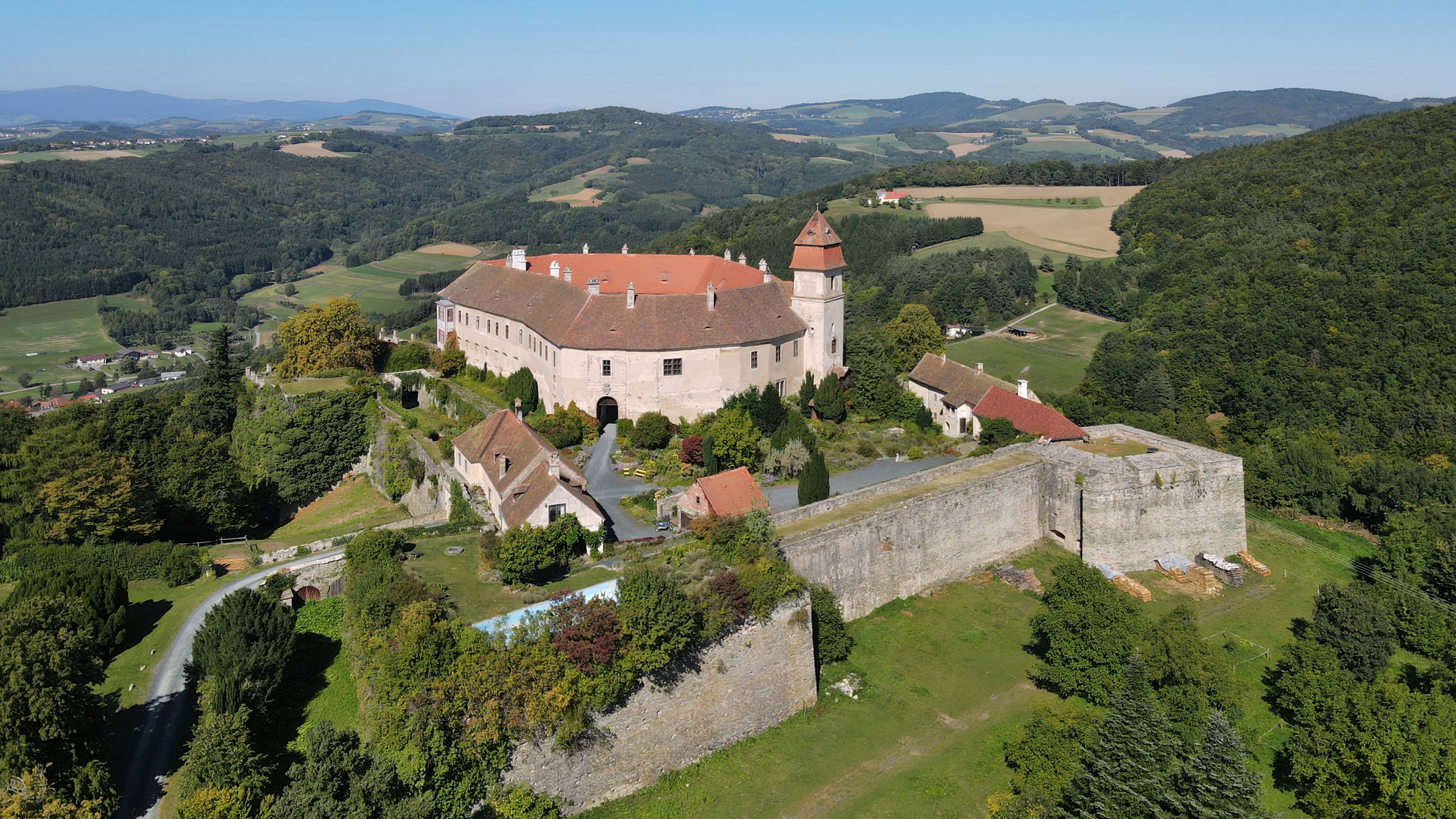
Aerial photography of the castle

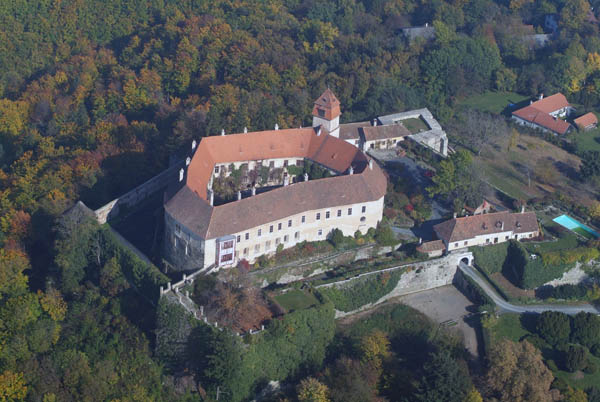

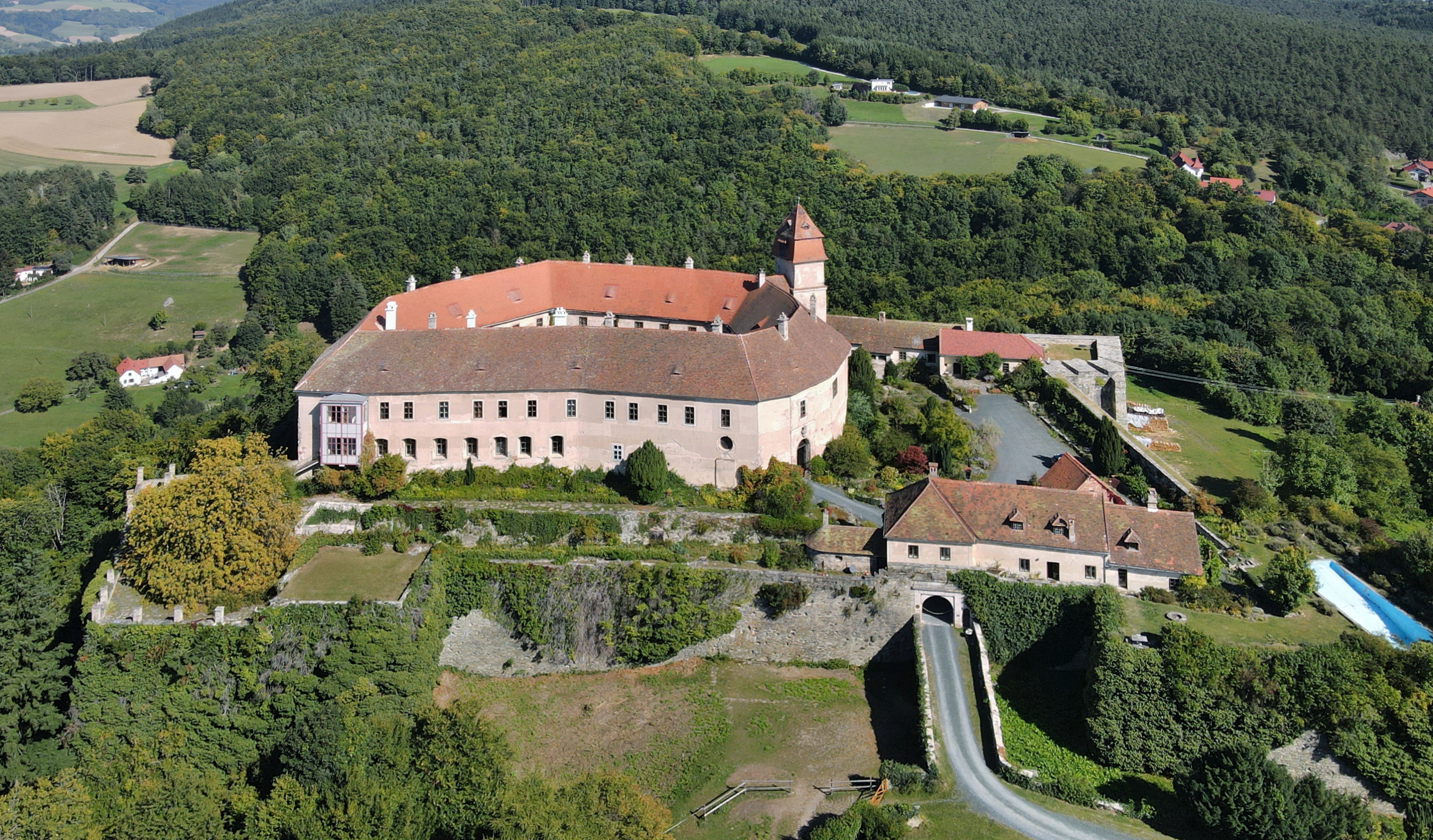
South-southwest view

== Notable residents ==
- László Almásy (1895–1951): a Hungarian aristocrat, motorist, desert researcher, aviator, Scout-leader and soldier who served as the basis for the protagonist in Michael Ondaatje's 1992 novel The English Patient and the movie based on it.
