= Eberau =

- Municipality
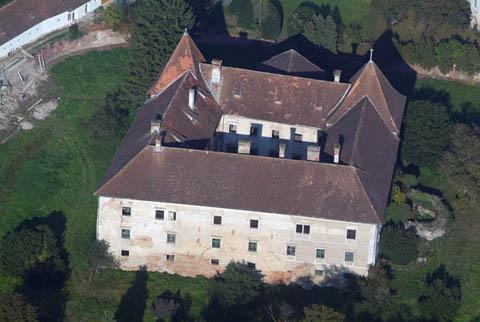

- Coat of arms

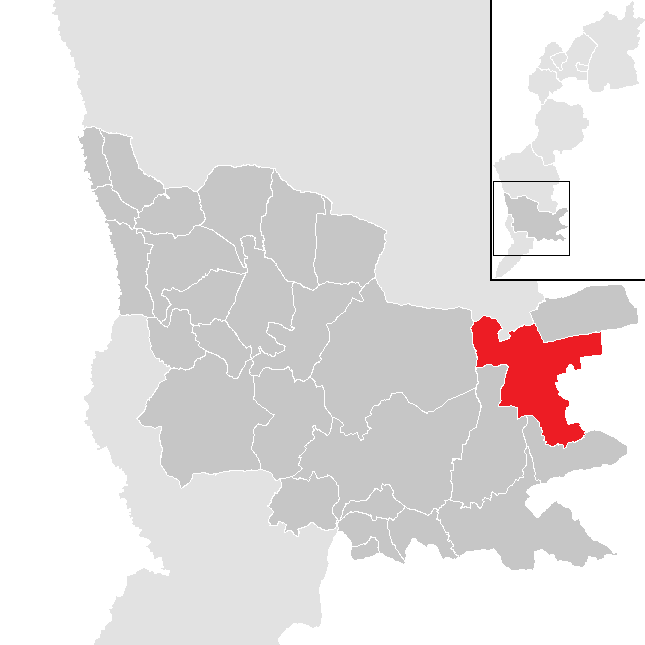
- Location within Güssing district

- Location within Austria
- Coordinates: 47°6′N 16°28′E
- Country: Austria
- State: Burgenland
- District: Güssing

Government
  - Mayor: Johann Weber (ÖVP)

Area
  - Total: 30.74 km^{2} (11.87 sq mi)
- Elevation: 215 m (705 ft)

Population (2022-01-01)
  - Total: 382
  - Density: 12.4/km^{2} (32.2/sq mi)
- Time zone: UTC+1 (CET)
  - Summer (DST): UTC+2 (CEST)
- Postal code: 7521
- Website: www.eberau.at

Eberau (German pronunciation: [eːbəˈʁaʊ̯]; Croatian: Eberava, Hungarian: Monyorókerék derived from "mogyoró"=hazelnut, "kerek"=round) is a town in the Austrian state of Burgenland in the district of Güssing.

== Population ==
Historical population
Year	Pop.	±%
1869	1,761	—
1880	1,796	+2.0%
1890	2,021	+12.5%
1900	2,048	+1.3%
1910	1,986	−3.0%
1923	1,735	−12.6%
1934	1,605	−7.5%
1939	1,527	−4.9%
1951	1,506	−1.4%
1961	1,361	−9.6%
1971	1,213	−10.9%
1981	1,133	−6.6%
1991	1,024	−9.6%
2001	1,081	+5.6%
2011	1,012	−6.4%
2021	928	−8.3%

== Gallery ==
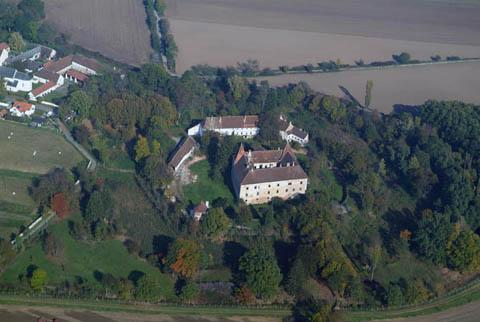

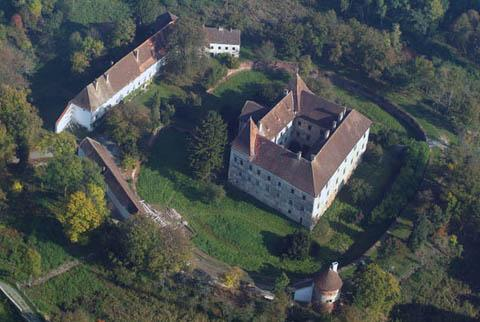

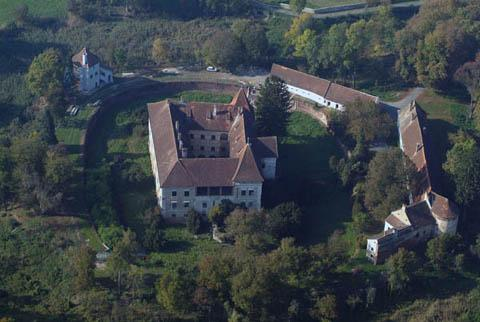
