= Zalavég =

- Village
- Flag Coat of arms

- Location of Zalavég
- Coordinates: 47.006231°N 17.02615°E
- Country: Hungary
- Region: Western Transdanubia
- County: Zala
- District: Zalaszentgrót

Area
  - Total: 12.11 km^{2} (4.68 sq mi)

Population (1 January 2026)
  - Total: 340
  - Density: 28/km^{2} (73/sq mi)
- Time zone: UTC+1 (CET)
  - Summer (DST): UTC+2 (CEST)
- Postal code: 8792
- Area code: (+36) 83
- Website: zalaveg.hu

Zalavég is a village in Zala County, Hungary.
