= Szőc =

- Flag Coat of arms

- Location of Veszprém county in Hungary

- Location of Szőc
- Coordinates: 47.02069°N 17.51342°E
- Country: Hungary
- County: Veszprém

Area
  - Total: 7.55 km^{2} (2.92 sq mi)

Population (2004)
  - Total: 425
  - Density: 56.29/km^{2} (145.8/sq mi)
- Time zone: UTC+1 (CET)
  - Summer (DST): UTC+2 (CEST)
- Postal code: 8452
- Area code: 88

Szőc is a village in Veszprém county, Hungary.
