= Oltárc =

Oltárc Ultarc / Ultarec (in Croatian)
- Village
- Flag Coat of arms

- Location of Oltárc
- Coordinates: 46.53118°N 16.83258°E
- Country: Hungary
- Region: Western Transdanubia
- County: Zala
- District: Letenye

Area
  - Total: 29.54 km^{2} (11.41 sq mi)

Population (1 January 2025)
  - Total: 226
  - Density: 7.65/km^{2} (19.8/sq mi)
- Time zone: UTC+1 (CET)
  - Summer (DST): UTC+2 (CEST)
- Postal code: 8886
- Area code: (+36) 93
- Website: oltarc.hu

Oltárc is a village in Zala County, Hungary.
