= Gyűrűs =

Coordinates: 46°52′59″N 16°59′26″E

- Village
- Coat of arms
- Interactive map of Gyűrűs
- Country: Hungary
- Region: Western Transdanubia
- County: Zala County
- Time zone: UTC+1 (CET)
  - Summer (DST): UTC+2 (CEST)

Gyűrűs is a village in Zala County, Hungary.
