= Zalaszántó =

- Village
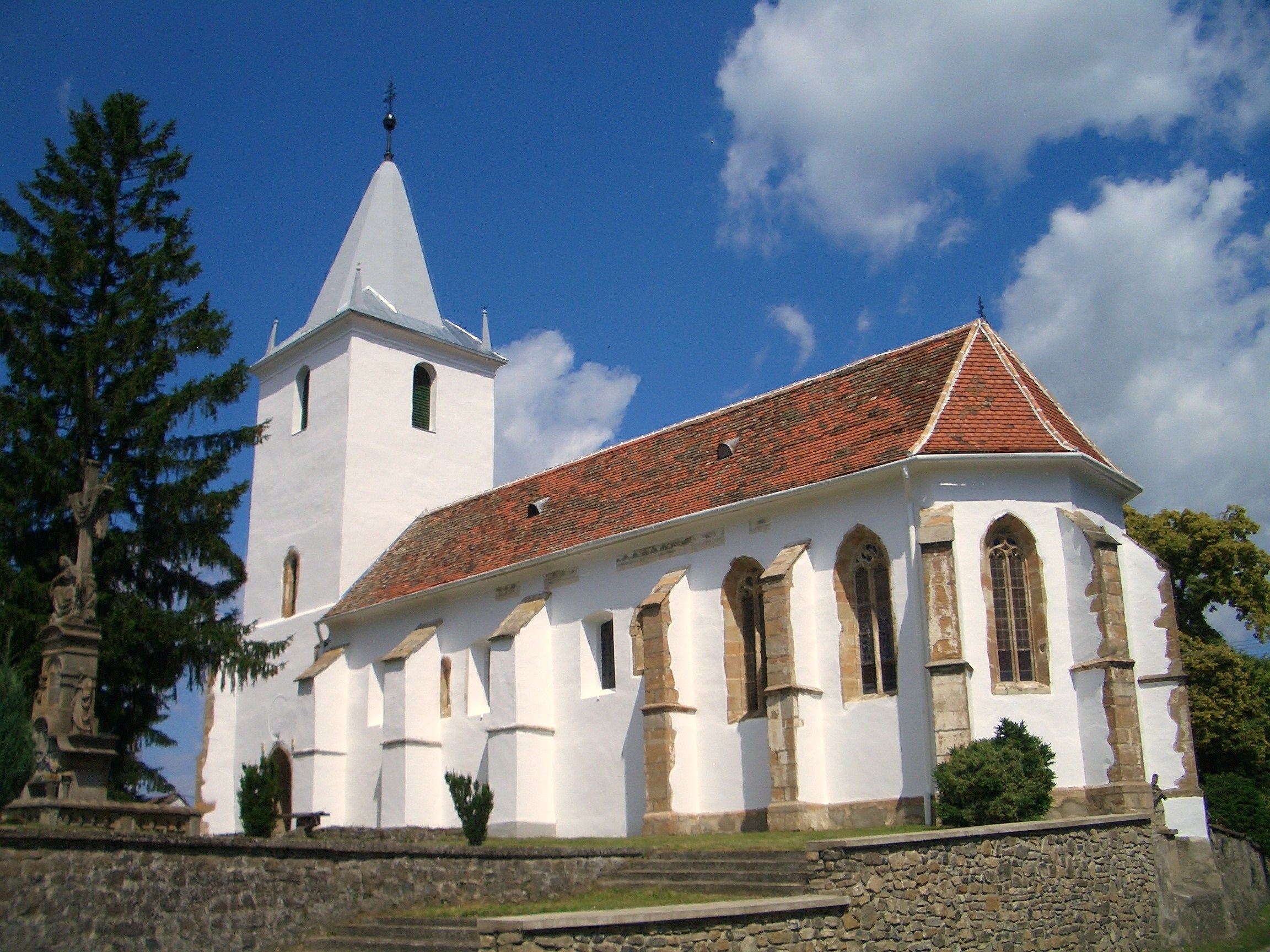

- Flag Coat of arms

- Location of Zalaszántó
- Coordinates: 46.88323°N 17.22718°E
- Country: Hungary
- Region: Western Transdanubia
- County: Zala
- District: Keszthely

Area
  - Total: 37.73 km^{2} (14.57 sq mi)

Population (1 January 2026)
  - Total: 931
  - Density: 24.7/km^{2} (63.9/sq mi)
- Time zone: UTC+1 (CET)
  - Summer (DST): UTC+2 (CEST)
- Postal code: 8353
- Area code: (+36) 83
- Website: www.zalaszanto.hu

Zalaszántó is a village in Zala County, Hungary. It is home to a large Buddhist stupa.
