= Csépán I Ják =

Hungarian lord

Csépán (I) Ják

Ban of Slavonia
- Reign: 1206–1207
- Predecessor: Mercurius
- Successor: Bánk Bár-Kalán
- Born: c. 1170
- Died: after 1216
- Buried: Pornó Abbey
- Noble family: gens Ják
- Issue: Stephen I
- Father: Mika I

Csépán (I) from the kindred Ják (Hungarian: Ják nembeli (I.) Csépán; died after 1202) was a Hungarian influential lord in the early 13th century, who served as Ban of Slavonia from 1206 to 1207.

== Family background ==
Csépán (or Chepan, a variant of the name Stephen) was born around 1170 into the influential gens (clan) Ják, which possessed landholdings mainly in Vas County in Western Transdanubia, but also had estates in other areas of the Kingdom of Hungary. His father was the powerful lord Mika (I), who held the most prestigious offices in the court of King Emeric. Some academic works consider that Ivan (Jovan), from whom later generations of the Jáks descended, was Csépán's brother, but it is more likely that he was his uncle.

== Life and career ==
Despite Mika supported Emeric during his conflict with his younger brother, Csépán rose to prominence in the royal court after Andrew II ascended the Hungarian throne in 1205. He served as Ban of Slavonia from 1206 to 1207. Beside that, he was also styled as ispán of Somogy County in 1207. He remained in both positions until 1208 and 1209 at the latest, respectively. The reason for his loss of influence was that after the first few years, King Andrew no longer needed the support and government experience of the former pro-Emeric lords.

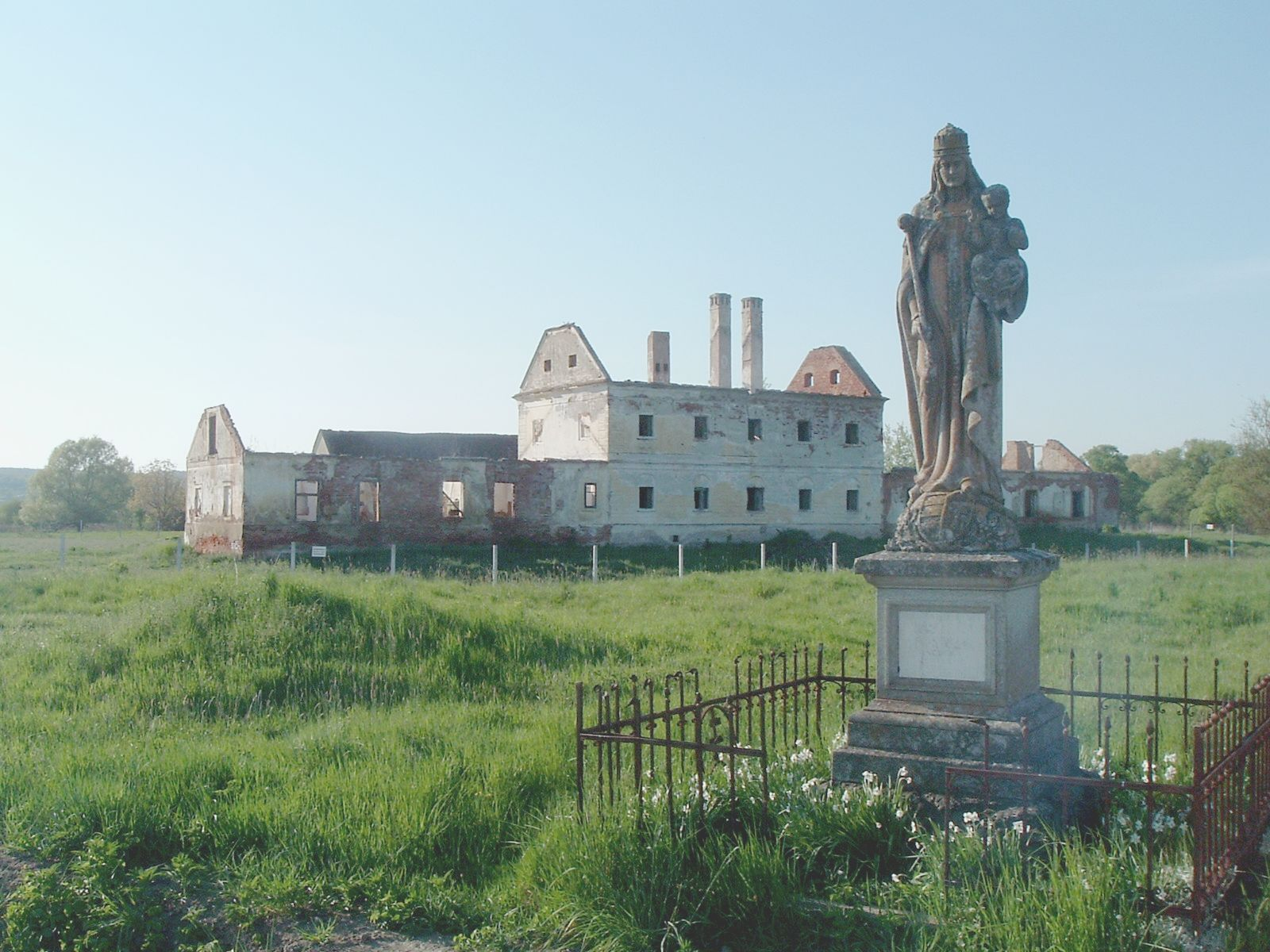
Ruins of the former abbey building in Pornóapáti

According to a royal charter from 1325, he erected the Benedictine monastery of Pornó. The settlement was his permanent residence, he lived in a mansion on an island at the confluence of the Pornó stream and the Pinka river. The abbey was dedicated to Margaret of Antioch. Since a 1221 charter attributes this merit to Mika, the process was probably started by his father, and his son, Csépán, completed the foundation of the abbey and its provision with donations (possibly around 1214). Prior to 1209, Csépán possessed the lordship of Szentgyörgy in Pozsony County (present-day Svätý Jur, Slovakia), but King Andrew II bought from him and donated it to his faithful partisan Sebes Hont-Pázmány in that year. Thereafter, the lordship became the eponymous seat of the Szentgyörgyi family from the Hont-Pázmány clan. Csépán was still alive in 1216, when Andrew II confirmed his donation to Sebes. He definitely died before 1221, but he was probably not even alive in 1219 (see below). He was buried in the abbey church of Pornó.

Csépán's only known son was Stephen (I), who was still an adolescent when his father died. He became a Cistercian friar. With the permission of Andrew II, he handed over Pornó Abbey and its right of patronage to the Szentgotthárd Abbey, where he himself moved, in a lengthy process in 1219–1223. With this act of incorporation, Stephen also renounced his inheritance in favor of the Cistercians, which consisted of additional four villages – Monyorókerék, Hétfőhely, Perwolf and Kölked – besides Pornó. This was preceded by the division of Csépán's estates among the branches of the Ják kindred. Stephen's move contributed to Csépán's cousin, Martin (I), starting the construction of the Ják church.

== Sources ==
- Karácsonyi, János (1900). A magyar nemzetségek a XIV. század közepéig. [The Hungarian genera until the middle of the 14th century] (in Hungarian). Hungarian Academy of Sciences.
- Markó, László (2006). A magyar állam főméltóságai Szent Istvántól napjainkig: Életrajzi Lexikon [Great Officers of State in Hungary from King Saint Stephen to Our Days: A Biographical Encyclopedia] (in Hungarian). Helikon Kiadó. ISBN 963-208-970-7.
- Rácz, György (2022). A jáki apátság és kegyurai a középkorban [The Abbey of Ják and its Patrons in the Middle Ages] (in Hungarian). National Archives of Hungary. ISBN 978-963-631-308-1.
- Zsoldos, Attila (2011). Magyarország világi archontológiája, 1000–1301 [Secular Archontology of Hungary, 1000–1301] (in Hungarian). História, MTA Történettudományi Intézete. ISBN 978-963-9627-38-3.
- Zsoldos, Attila (2022). Az Aranybulla királya [The King of the Golden Bull] (in Hungarian). Városi Levéltár és Kutatóintézet. ISBN 978-963-8406-26-2.

Csépán I Genus Ják Born: c. 1170 Died: after 1216
Political offices
Preceded by Mercurius	Ban of Slavonia; 1206–1207	Succeeded by Bánk Bár-Kalán
