= Martin Ják =

Hungarian lord

Martin (I) Ják
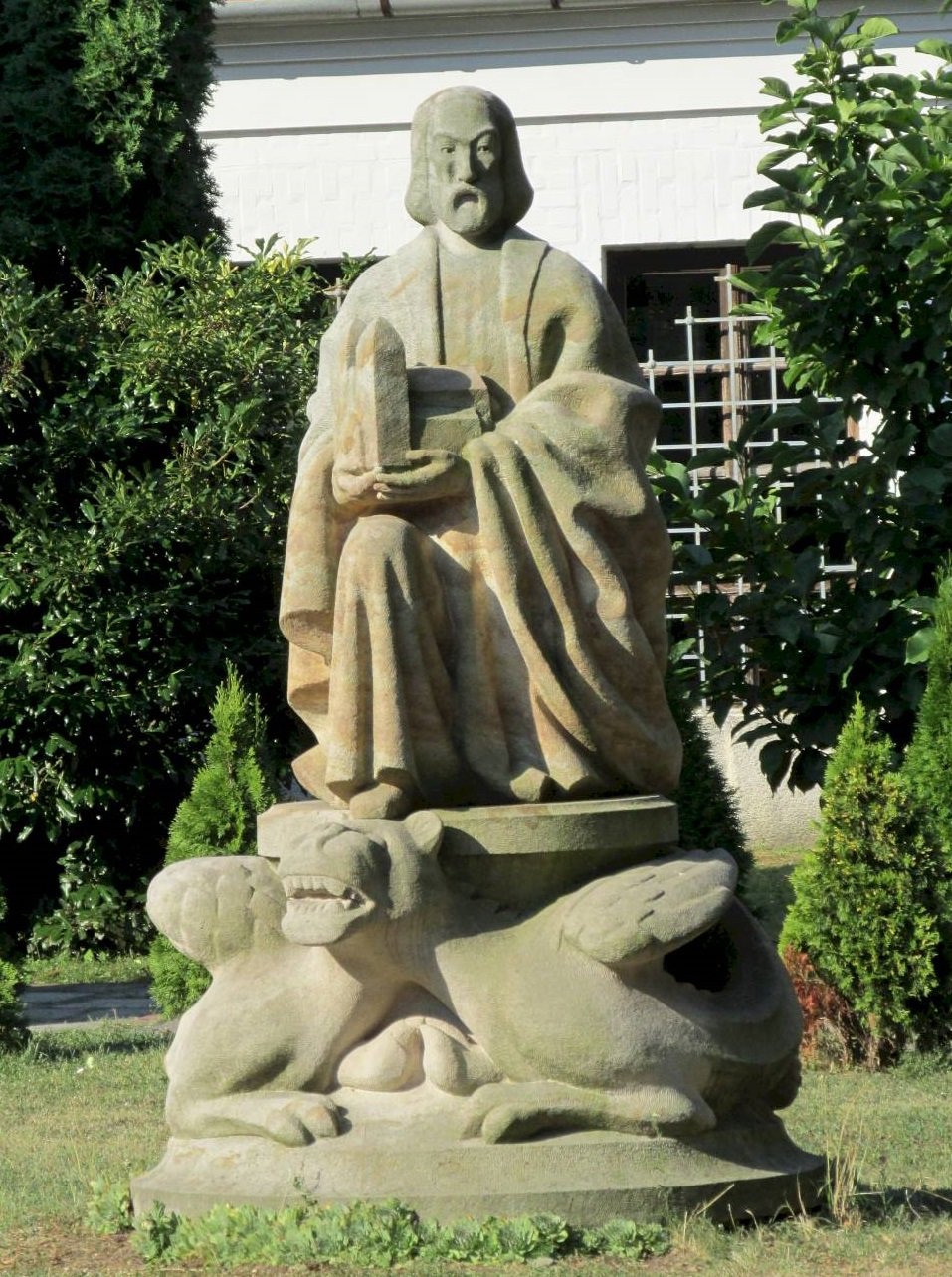
- Sculpture of Martin Ják in Ják by Dávid Raffay (2004)

Ban of Slavonia
- Reign: 1224
- Predecessor: Michael, son of Ampud
- Successor: Aladar
- Born: c. 1190
- Died: c. 1250
- Buried: Ják Abbey
- Noble family: gens Ják
- Issue: Casimir; Martin II; Zlaudus
- Father: Ivan

Martin (I) from the kindred Ják (Hungarian: Ják nembeli (I.) Márton; c. 1190 – c. 1250) was a Hungarian lord in the first half of the 13th century, who served as Ban of Slavonia in 1224. Also known as Martin the Great or the Elder (Latin: Marthinus Magnus), he founded the Benedictine monastery in Ják, whose church is the most significant surviving work of Hungarian Romanesque architecture.

== Family background ==
Martin (I) was born around 1190 into the influential gens (clan) Ják, which possessed landholdings mainly in Vas County in Western Transdanubia, but also had estates in other areas of the Kingdom of Hungary. His father was Ivan (or Jovan), about whom no information has survived other than his name. Some academic works consider that Ivan was the son of the influential lord Mika (I), but it is more likely that he was his brother, thus Martin belonged to the same generation as his cousin, Csépán (I), who erected a monastery in Pornó. Martin had a younger brother James, head of the clan's Nevna sub-branch.

Martin had three sons from his marriage with an unidentified noblewoman: Casimir, Martin (II) and Zlaudus. The latter entered ecclesiastical career, rose through the ranks from the 1220s onwards, and finally served as Bishop of Veszprém from 1245 until his death in 1262. Since Martin had excellent Bavarian connections, it is possible that his wife (or his father's wife) came from there.

== Life and career ==
=== Office-holdings ===
Due to the fact that there were several lords of the era with the given name Martin, it is difficult to outline his career. As a result his high social status (see below), it is justified to attribute more significant positions to him. Hungarian historian Attila Zsoldos considered that Martin Hont-Pázmány is identical with that baron, who held offices in the 1200s and the early 1210s, while formerly other historians attributed these data to Martin Ják. It is plausible that Martin Ják served as ispán of Vas County already in 1215. It is possible that Martin participated in the Fifth Crusade from 1217 to 1218, where he became acquainted with the cult of Saint George, and he maybe even acquired a relic of the early Christian martyr.

Coat-of-arms of the gens Ják

In early 1220s, he joined the inner circle of Duke Béla, who complained about his father's number of measures and land policy. He was among those lords, who forced Andrew II to share his realm with his heir, who was made Duke of Slavonia in 1220. It is possible that Martin followed his lord Béla into exile to Austria in late 1223, after Andrew forced his son to separate from his wife. After their reconciliation mediated by Pope Honorius III, Béla and his entourage returned to Hungary and the duke took control over Slavonia. In mid-1224, Martin was made ispán of Vas County, which then belonged to the duke's realm. This geographical proximity determined the political orientation of Martin and the Ják kindred. By the end of the year, he was appointed Ban of Slavonia. He is mentioned in this capacity only once, on 24 December 1224. He was replaced by Aladar in 1225 at the latest. However, no later source style him with the honorary title "banus"; instead, he appears with the title "comes" (i.e. ispán) in contemporary records. Zsoldos argued that his short reign as Ban of Slavonia did not leave a deep mark on contemporaries and posterity. After Béla was transferred from Slavonia to Transylvania in 1226, Martin did not follow the duke to the eastern province and remained in Transdanubia.

After Béla IV ascended the Hungarian throne in 1235, Martin regained his political influence. He joined the court of Duke Coloman, the king's younger brother, who had administered Slavonia since 1226. Martin was styled as ispán of Vas County again in 1236. He served as ispán of Zala County from 1240 to 1241, which then also belonged to Coloman's dukedom. There, Martin possessed landholdings too. During the first Mongol invasion of Hungary, Coloman was killed. Martin was present in the escort of Béla IV in the autumn of 1241, when the royal court fled to Slavonia from the Mongols.

His name appears in various estate records from 1221 onwards. In that year, he was involved in a procedure for demarcating possession boundaries as a neighboring lord. Still in 1221, he and his brother James tried to satisfy the possible claims of the clan's poorer branch when dividing the inheritance of the late Csépán (I). Martin and James handed over their estate Köröselő to their nine distant relatives after a lengthy legal dispute. The senior branch thus lost their possessions around Jákfa, becoming geographically separated from their poorer relatives. It is also possible that the senior branch – Martin and James – played a role in the left-bank branch receiving the royal donation of Uraj, which settled the claims of the poorer branch. In 1223, Martin appeared together with his brother James in a possession case involving the Cistercian Klostermarienberg Abbey (Borsmonostor, today part of Mannersdorf an der Rabnitz, Austria). This is when the abbot of Ják is first mentioned. They gathered together because a discussion was taking place at the time regarding the Cistercian incorporation of the monastery of Pornó. His high social status and his role as "paterfamilias" of the Jáks are indicated by the fact that when in 1233 the poorer branch of the Ják clan requested confirmation of their possession of Uraj, they were simply referred to as "relatives of Count Martin". In 1238, a distant relative Lawrence (ancestor of the Sitkei family) was also referred to as "de genere Martini comitis", instead of naming the Ják clan. In 1244, Martin, James and their sons were mentioned as neighboring lords near Đakovo (Diakovár) in Valkó County, since they possessed the lordship of Nevna (present-day Levanjska Varoš in Croatia). 14th-century documents (from 1325 and 1333) styled the late Martin with the epithet "the Great" (Magnus), which, in addition to his former social prestige, was primarily intended to clearly distinguish him from his namesake son and grandson by his descendants.

=== Foundation of the Ják monastery ===
Martin and his family lived in their eponymous residence of Ják. In the early 1230s, he had a walled residential tower built on the site of the previous early-12th-century brick manor (or palace), which met the customs of the time. The remains of this were eventually removed when the Baroque abbey house was built in the late 18th century.

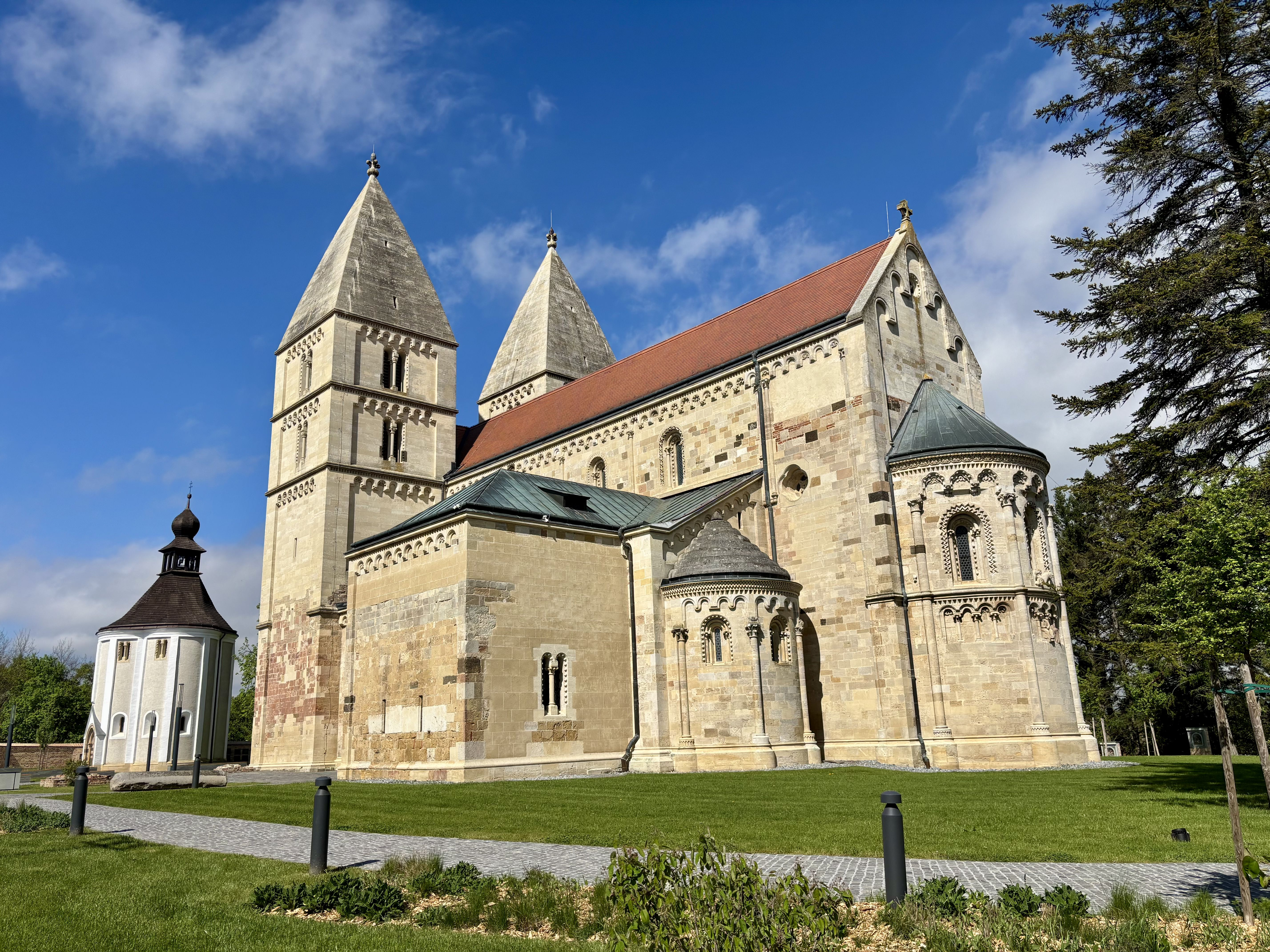
The church of Ják after its renovation in 2025

Following the death of his cousin Csépán around 1219, his only son Stephen (I) joined the Cistercians. With the permission of Andrew II, the young friar handed over Pornó Abbey and its right of patronage to the Szentgotthárd Abbey, where he himself moved, in a lengthy process in 1219–1223. With this act of incorporation, Stephen also renounced his inheritance in favor of the Cistercians, which consisted of additional four villages – Monyorókerék, Hétfőhely, Perwolf and Kölked – besides Pornó. This was preceded by the division of Csépán's estates among the branches of the Ják kindred, which satisfied the demands of Martin and James. Stephen's move, by which the Ják clan lost its monastery, contributed to that Martin started the construction of a new church in Ják, which was intended to replace the lost monastery of Pornó for his kindred. According to archaeologist Ilona Valter, Martin founded the Benedictine abbey of Ják, dedicated to Saint George, around 1220. It is certain that the existence of the monastery was already mentioned in 1221 and 1223. Opposite the Pornó Abbey, which Mika and Csépán established on their own estate, Martin built the new church on the common clan estate in Ják. The foundation of the monastery brought him important prestige, and its construction was influenced by his desire to distance himself from the poorer branches of the Ják clan. An important aspect was that it surpasses the Pornó Monastery in monumentality and decoration. Monasteries were built in the region during these years (for instance, in Lébény and Türje), and Martin's goal was also to surpass them. Martin was able to finance the construction of the church mostly from the income from his position as ispán of Vas County (Martin's office was one of the most profitable ones, annually 300–500 marks, at that time), which may have been supported by the acquisition of Roman gold finds in the area. Compared to his contemporaries, Martin, however, was only able to support the operation of the monastery with a small number of landholdings. These included, in addition to the southern part of the village Ják, the land Rádóc (mentioned in 1221), Kápolnafölde (today a borough of Bögöt) and Lovászad (Luising, today a borough of Heiligenbrunn, Austria).

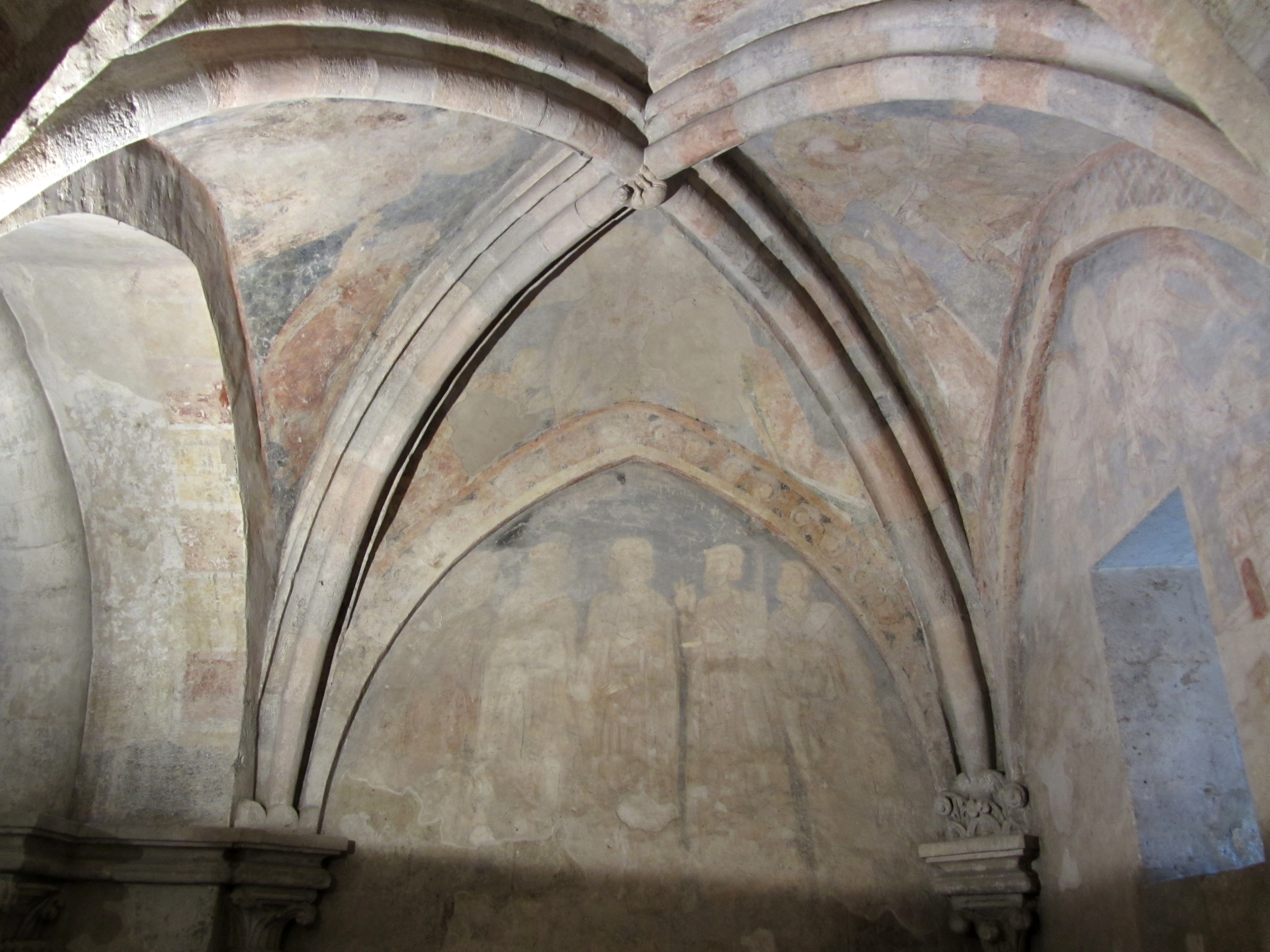
Art historians believe that a fresco of the Ják church depicting a group of five people (middle) depicts Martin Ják and his family members

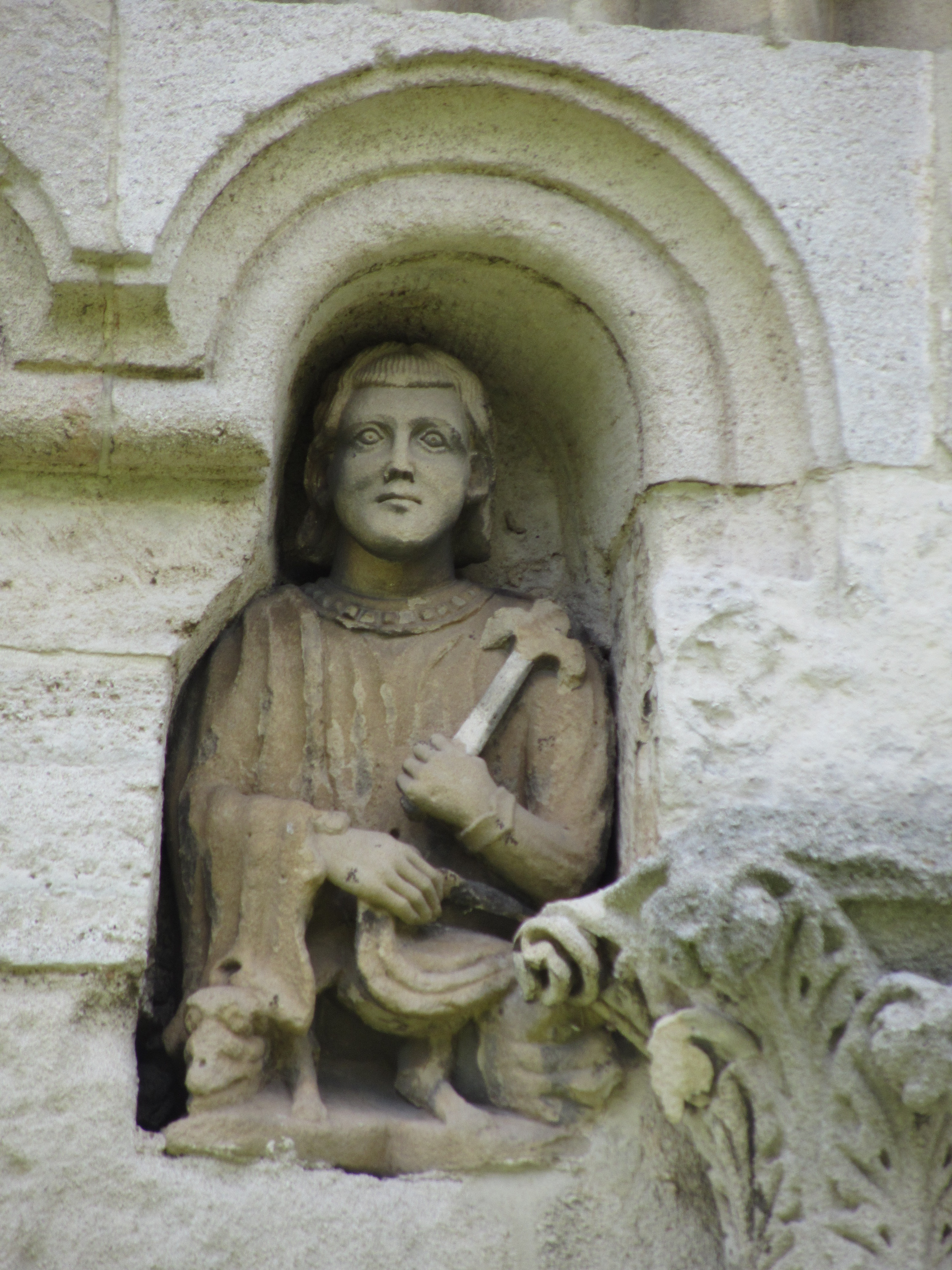
A relief on the north façade of the Ják church perhaps represent its founder Martin Ják

The Hungarian art history has established that there is a demonstrably close connection between the stone carvings of the Ják church and of the ones in the Bamberg Cathedral, which was rebuilt at the same time as its construction, but the influence of northern French, Norman and Burgundian stonemason workshops can also be detected. It is likely that master builders from Bamberg worked on Ják in the 1220s and 1230s. Art historian Géza Entz identified Martin and his relatives (perhaps his sons) in a fresco on the south wall of the monastery, which depicts a group of five men and where they plausibly appear as donators of the church. The adjacent fresco may depict the death and burial of Martin. In addition, Ernő Marosi drew attention to a stone slab on the outside of the church, on the northern façade of the sanctuary, divided by a double niche, in which there are two reliefs. On the right, a beardless nobleman sitting on a bench and on the left, a dragon slayer, in which he sees the depiction of the founder (Martin Ják) and the titular saint of the church (Saint George), respectively.

Martin and/or his sons constructed another church in Nyirád in Zala County, which the Jáks owned. Stone carvings were found in the current church whose style was similar to the decorations of the church in Ják.

Martin died around 1250. He was buried in the abbey church, which was still under construction. Due to his death, the construction of the church was interrupted shortly before its completion, the vaulting of the main nave and southern aisle was not completed, and the church was eventually covered with a flat wooden ceiling. The church was completed in haste and consecrated in 1256 by Bishop Amadeus Pok, in the presence of Abbot Favus of Pannonhalma. After the consecration of the abbey church in 1256, which was reserved exclusively for the noble kindred, the nearby Saint James chapel became the village's parish church. Martin's brick tomb covered with stone slabs was discovered under the southern tower of the church during archaeological excavations in early 2021, when the building was completely renovated. The skeleton of a large (approx. 181 cm tall) man, who died in his late 50s, buried in the grave was removed by researchers for further examination. The skeleton showed several signs of battle injuries. Martin's remains, along with those of a 12th-century female relative and an infant, were reburied in a celebratory mass performed by Bishop János Székely in April 2024.

== Sources ==
- Karácsonyi, János (1900). A magyar nemzetségek a XIV. század közepéig. [The Hungarian genera until the middle of the 14th century] (in Hungarian). Hungarian Academy of Sciences.
- Rácz, György (2022). A jáki apátság és kegyurai a középkorban [The Abbey of Ják and its Patrons in the Middle Ages] (in Hungarian). National Archives of Hungary. ISBN 978-963-631-308-1.
- Zsoldos, Attila (2011). Magyarország világi archontológiája, 1000–1301 [Secular Archontology of Hungary, 1000–1301] (in Hungarian). História, MTA Történettudományi Intézete. ISBN 978-963-9627-38-3.
- Zsoldos, Attila (2022). Az Aranybulla királya [The King of the Golden Bull] (in Hungarian). Városi Levéltár és Kutatóintézet. ISBN 978-963-8406-26-2.

Martin I Genus Ják Born: c. 1190 Died: c. 1250
Political offices
Preceded by Michael, son of Ampud	Ban of Slavonia; 1224	Succeeded by Aladar
