= Mika Ják =

Hungarian lord

Mika (I) Ják

Palatine of Hungary
- Reign: 1199–1201
- Predecessor: Mog
- Successor: Benedict
- Died: after 1202
- Noble family: gens Ják
- Issue: Csépán I

Mika (I) from the kindred Ják (Hungarian: Ják nembeli (I.) Mika; died after 1202) was a Hungarian influential lord at the turn of the 12th and 13th centuries.

== Family ==
Mika (also Mike or Michael) belonged to the gens Ják, he was the first known member of the Jákmonostor branch. He was born around 1150. He had a son from his unidentified wife: Csépán I, who served as Ban of Slavonia from 1206 to 1207 and died without heirs, as his only son Stephen became a monk, giving up his secular life and family name. Mika's younger brother was Ivan (Jovan), who had two sons (Martin I and James) thus the later members of the Jákmonostor branch descended from him.

Mika founded the Pornó Abbey, dedicated to Margaret of Antioch, but the monastery itself was finished only by his son Csépán. Mika, who lived in a manor there, erected the monastery on an estate that he probably acquired, i.e. it was not part of the hereditary estates of the clan. The lordship of Pornó, additionally, consisted of four surrounding villages – Monyorókerék, Hétfőhely, Perwolf and Kölked.

== Career ==
He served as Master of the treasury (Latin: magister cubiculariourum) in 1198, when this dignity was still a non-permanent position without defined and circumscribed jurisdiction, thus the office was only stabilized during the reign of Andrew II of Hungary. Mika also held the office of ispán of Bihar County between 1198 and 1199. In 1199, he was appointed Judge royal (Latin: curialis comes), replacing Peter, son of Töre.

When Palatine Mog participated in Duke Andrew's conspiracy, Emeric, King of Hungary dismissed and replaced him with Mika Ják. However the appointment proved to be complicated procedure. According to Emeric's letter to Pope Innocent III, Mika was excommunicated by Elvin, Bishop of Várad because he had formerly captured one of the bishopric's priests, who functioned as a messenger of the King's enemies who supported Duke Andrew. Later Pope Innocent III ordered the Hungarian prelates not to degrade the excommunication as a political weapon, as a result Mika was able to reserve his office, who also served as ispán of Bács County (1199–1200), which presumably was the first ex officio ispánate of the Palatine dignity, and after that head of Bihar County (1200–1201). According to a non-authentic charter, Mika held the office of Palatine until 1202. As historian Attila Zsoldos proves by comparing with the previous allegations, Palatine Mika was not identical with his namesake, who served as ispán of Bihar County for several times in the 1210–20s.

== Sources ==
- (in Hungarian) Markó, László (2006). A magyar állam főméltóságai Szent Istvántól napjainkig – Életrajzi Lexikon ("The High Officers of the Hungarian State from Saint Stephen to the Present Days – A Biographical Encyclopedia") (2nd edition); Helikon Kiadó Kft., Budapest; ISBN 963-547-085-1
- Rácz, György (2022). A jáki apátság és kegyurai a középkorban [The Abbey of Ják and its Patrons in the Middle Ages] (in Hungarian). National Archives of Hungary. ISBN 978-963-631-308-1.
- (in Hungarian) Szőcs, Tibor (2014). A nádori intézmény korai története, 1000–1342 ("An Early History of the Palatinal Institution: 1000–1342"). Subsidia ad historiam medii aevi Hungariae inquirendam Vol. 5., Budapest; ISBN 978-963-508-697-9
- (in Hungarian) Zsoldos, Attila (2011). Magyarország világi archontológiája, 1000–1301 ("Secular Archontology of Hungary, 1000–1301"). História, MTA Történettudományi Intézete. Budapest. ISBN 978-963-9627-38-3

Mika I Genus Ják Born: ? Died: after 1202
Political offices
Preceded by Bogoslav eventually	Master of the treasury 1198	Succeeded by Solomon Atyusz (?)
Preceded by Peter, son of Töre	Judge royal 1199	Succeeded by Vejte Csanád
Preceded by Mog	Palatine of Hungary; 1199–1201	Succeeded by Benedict
