= Ovary (disambiguation) =

An ovary is a reproductive organ in female vertebrate.

Ovary may also refer to:

- Ovary (botany), reproductive organ in plants
- Leopold Óváry, Hungarian historian

== See also ==
- Overy (disambiguation)
