= Overy (surname) =

Overy is an English habitational surname from a place named after the Old English phrase ofer īe, "across the river", as for example Overy in Oxfordshire.

Notable people with the name include:

- James Overy (born 2007), Australian soccer player
- Mike Overy (1951–2021), American baseball player
- Paul Overy (1940–2008), British art historian and critic
- Richard Overy (born 1947), British historian

== See also ==
- Overy (disambiguation)
