= Mercurius of Slavonia =

Moravian lord

Mercurius

Ban of Slavonia
- Reign: 1205–1206
- Predecessor: Ipoch Bogátradvány
- Successor: Csépán Ják
- Died: after 1206
- Noble family: Janur kinship
- Spouse: Princess Margaret
- Issue: Janur

Mercurius (Hungarian: Merkúr; died after 1206) was a Moravian lord in the early 13th century, who settled down in the Kingdom of Hungary. As a confidant of King Andrew II of Hungary, he served as Ban of Slavonia from 1205 to 1206. He became related to the royal Árpád dynasty through his marriage.

== Origin ==
Early 19th-century historiographical works incorrectly propounded that Mercurius belonged to the powerful Hungarian clan Gutkeled. Since then, it was proved that he was grandfather of that Mérk (Myrk or Mercurius), Wenceslaus and James of the Csákányi family, about whom the 13th century chronicler Simon of Kéza mentions that they descended "from the dukes of Moravia and have ties of kinship with King Béla IV". According to historian Tibor Neumann, it is possible he is identical with one of the lords called Marquartus, whose name appear in contemporary charters from the Kingdom of Bohemia. However, he was certainly not member of the Přemyslid dynasty, despite Simon's account.

== Career in Hungary ==
The circumstances of his arrival to Hungary is unknown. Perhaps it occurred in 1198, when King Ottokar I of Bohemia married to Constance of Hungary, the sister of Emeric, King of Hungary and Duke Andrew. A letter of judgment from 1413 mentions that Mercurius was granted the estates Kolon and Kovácsi in Nyitra County (present-day Kolíňany in Slovakia) from King Andrew II around 1205. The monarch also married off his "blood relative" ("consanguinea") Margaret to the Moravian lord. It is possible this Margaret is identical with the daughter of Géza II, who had been widowed twice before as the wife of Isaac Doukas then Andrew, Ban of Slavonia. If this is the place, Mercurius' wife died before 1208. Their marriage produced a son Janur (or Gyánúr), ancestor of the Koloni and Rovi noble families, which flourished until the first half of the 15th century.

Mercurius was installed as Ban of Slavonia in 1205, serving in this capacity until 1206. Beside that, he also administered Somogy County. Thereafter, he functioned as ispán of Pozsony County for a brief time in 1206. At some point in his life (prior to 1213), he sold the land Hagymás in Bihar County (today Hășmaș, Romania) to Boleslaus, Bishop of Vác.

== Sources ==
- Markó, László (2006). A magyar állam főméltóságai Szent Istvántól napjainkig: Életrajzi Lexikon [Great Officers of State in Hungary from King Saint Stephen to Our Days: A Biographical Encyclopedia] (in Hungarian). Helikon Kiadó. ISBN 963-208-970-7.
- Neumann, Tibor (2009). "Egy morva "herceg" és egy Árpád-házi hercegnő leszármazottai (A Gyánúr-fiak eredete és rövid története) [Offspring of a Moravian "Duke" and a Hungarian Princess (The Origin and Short Story of the Janur Kindred)]". Acta Universitatis Szegediensis. Acta Historica (in Hungarian). 130. MTA-SZTE-MOL Magyar Medievisztikai Kutatócsoport: 15–32. ISSN 0324-6965.
- Zsoldos, Attila (2011). Magyarország világi archontológiája, 1000–1301 [Secular Archontology of Hungary, 1000–1301] (in Hungarian). História, MTA Történettudományi Intézete. ISBN 978-963-9627-38-3.

Political offices
Preceded by Ipoch Bogátradvány	Ban of Slavonia; 1205–1206	Succeeded by Csépán Ják
