= Overy =

Overy may refer to:

== Places ==
- Burnham Overy, a civil parish on the north coast of Norfolk, England
- Burton Overy, a civil parish in the Harborough district of Leicestershire, England

== People ==
- Overy (surname), including a list of people with the name

== Other ==
- Allen & Overy, a British law firm

== See also ==
- Ovary, reproductive organ in many animals
