= Ják =

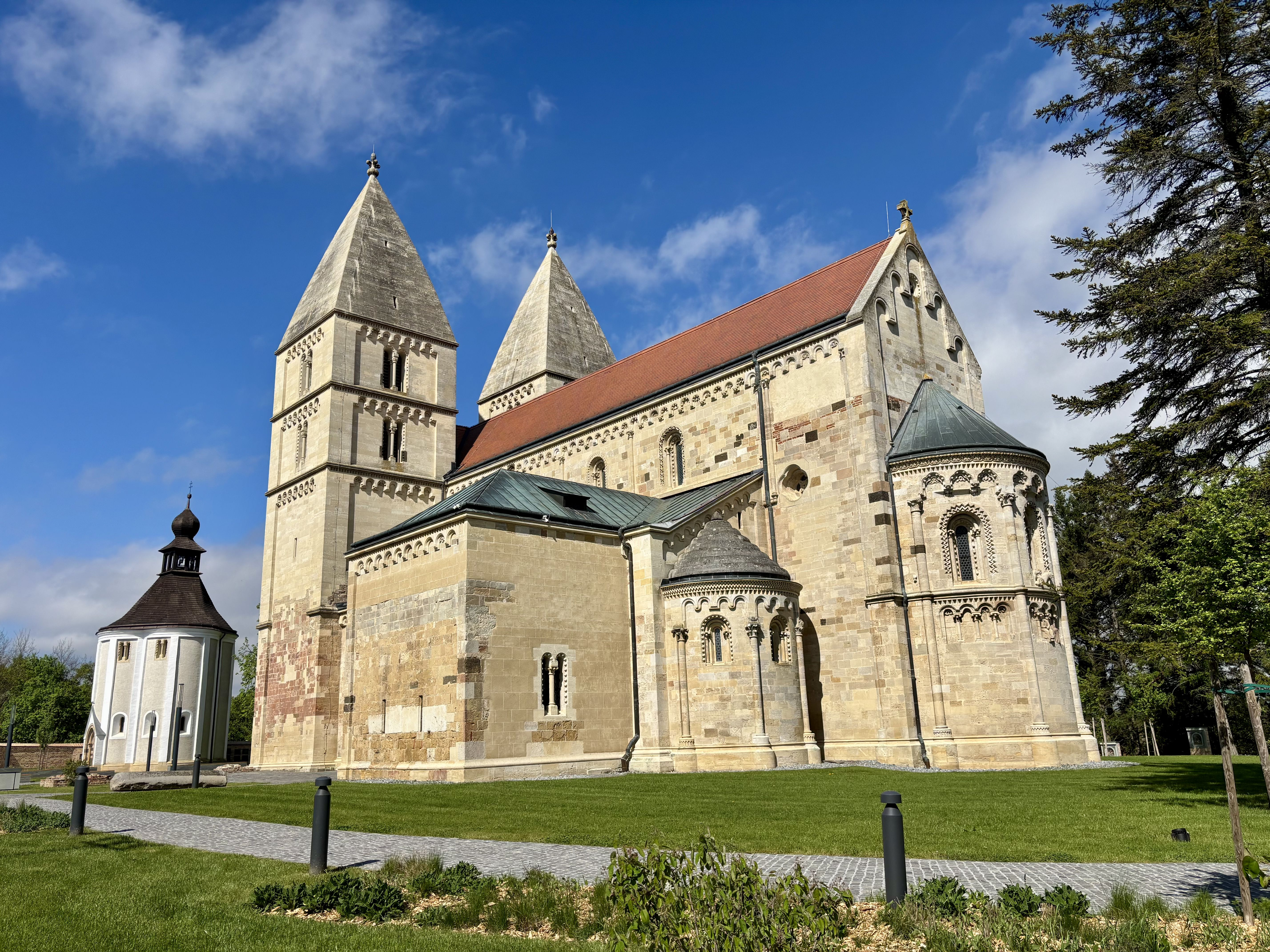
- The parish church of Ják, consecrated by Amadeus Pok in 1256

- Flag Coat of arms

- Location within Hungary
- Coordinates: 47.13931°N 16.58244°E
- Country: Hungary
- County: Vas

Area
  - Total: 44.95 km^{2} (17.36 sq mi)

Population (2004)
  - Total: 2,475
  - Density: 55.06/km^{2} (142.6/sq mi)
- Time zone: UTC+1 (CET)
  - Summer (DST): UTC+2 (CEST)
- Postal code: 9798
- Area code: 94
- Website: https://jak.hu/

Ják is a village in Vas County, on the western boundary of Hungary.

== Church of Saint George ==
The parish church of Ják is the best preserved Romanesque church in Hungary. It was originally built as the church of a Benedictine monastery, founded by comes Martin Ják. The village church at that time was a rotunda in front of the façade of the main doorway of Ják church.

Both outside and inside the church is adorned with rich sculptures. The 3 naves and 3 apses are formed in a basilica structure. Columnar capitals are sculptured by plant and some animal ornamentation.

The rotunda has been built with 4 apses and 2 floors.

=== Exterior of the church of Ják ===
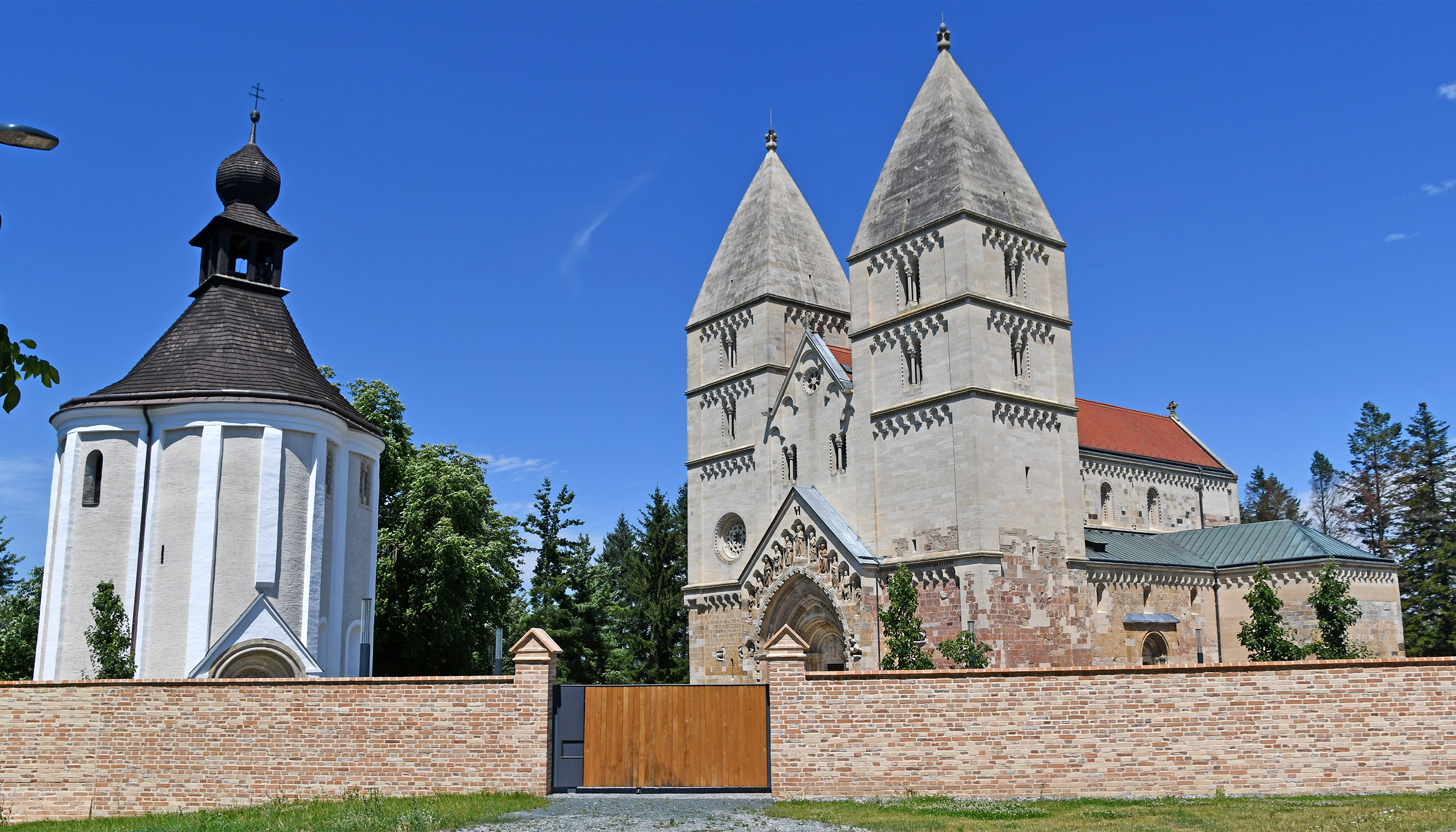

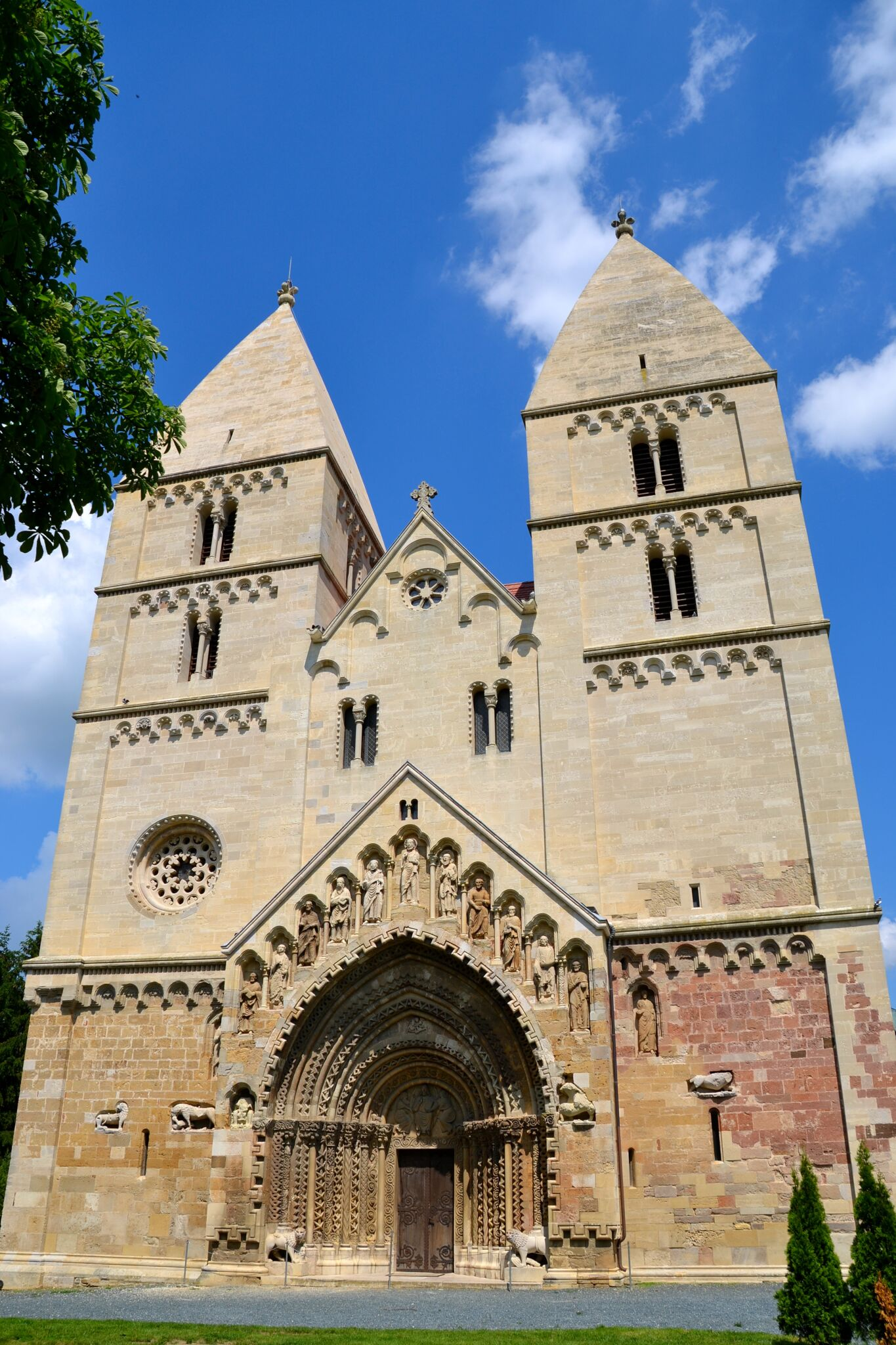

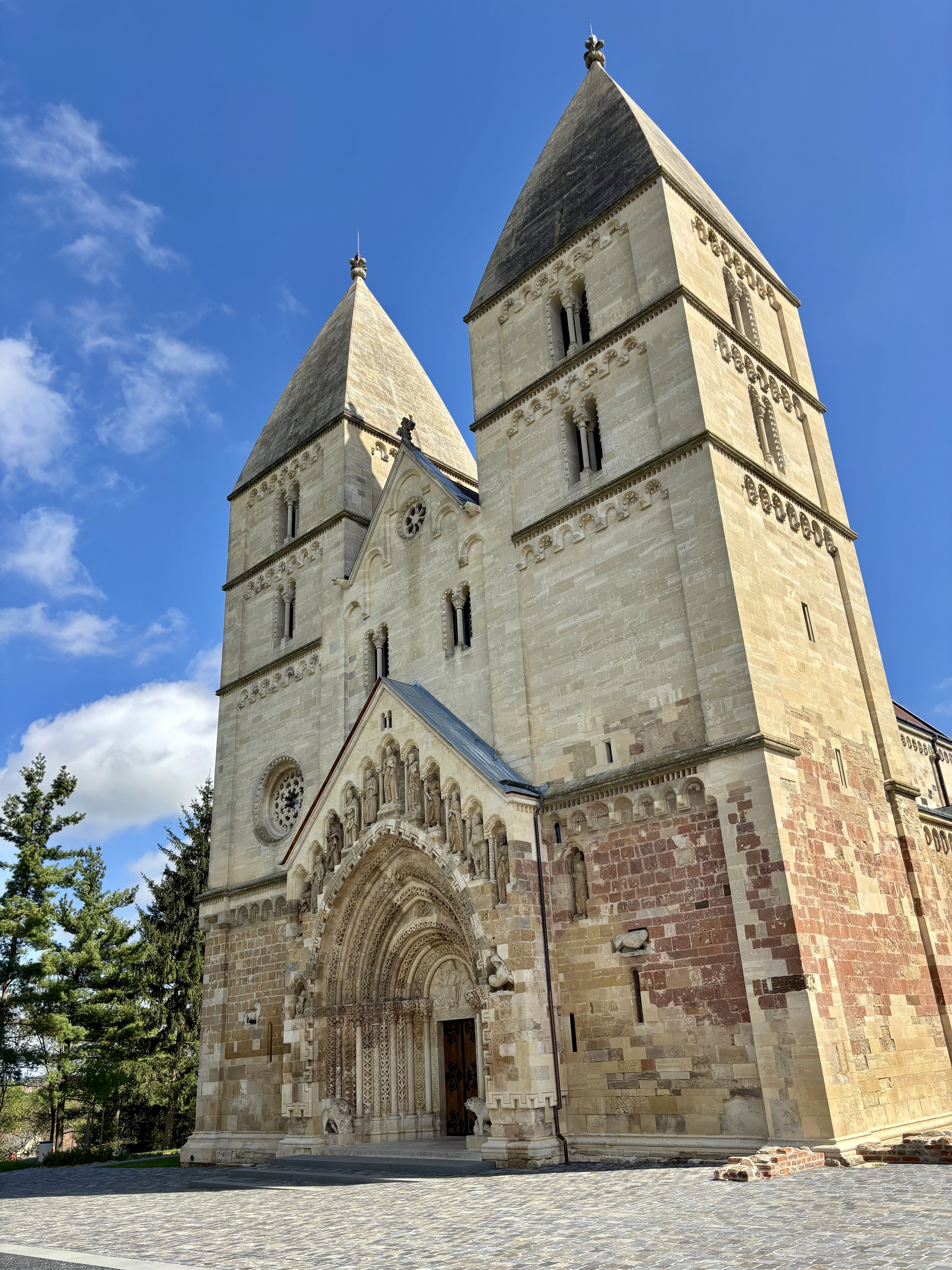

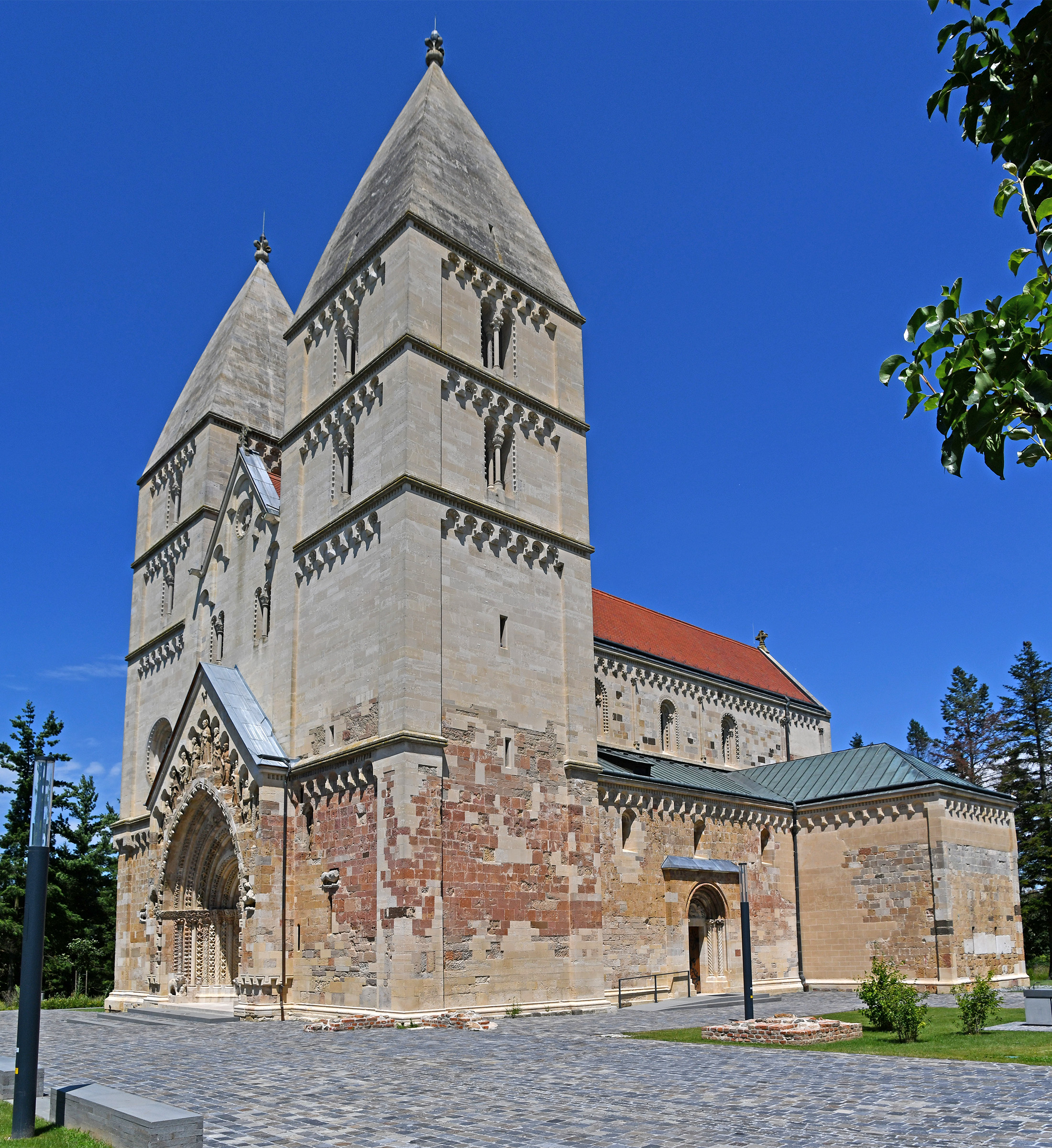

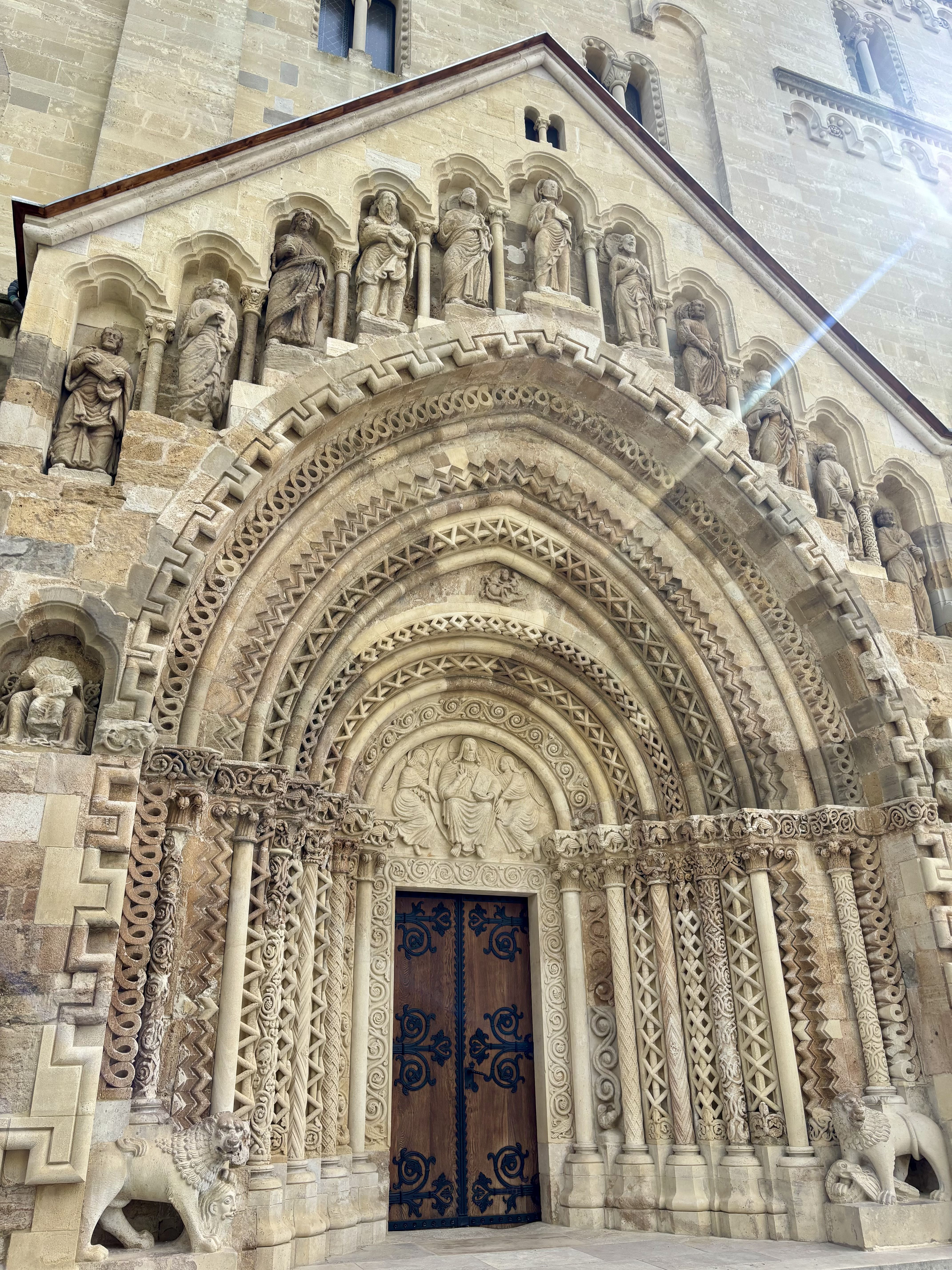

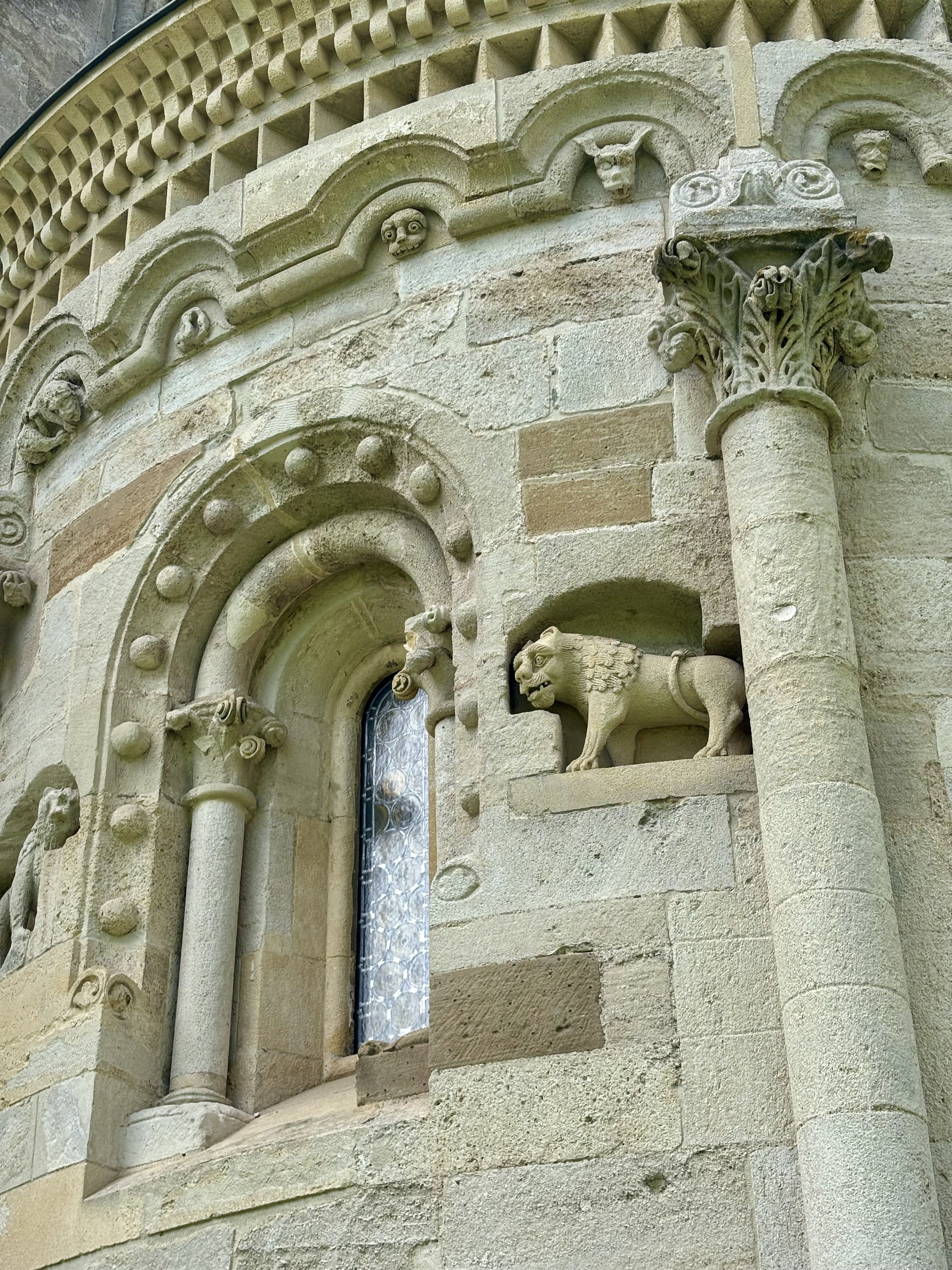

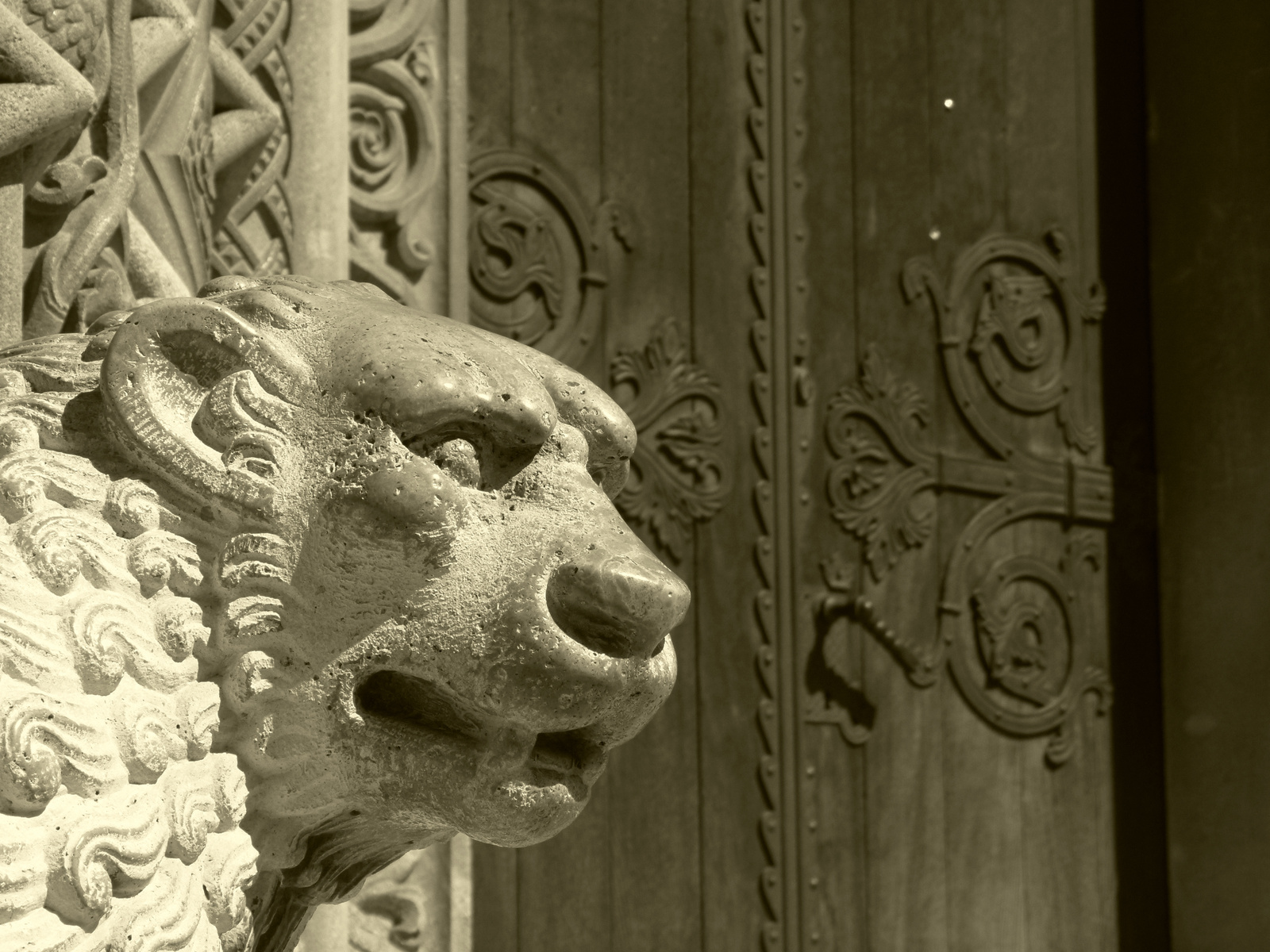

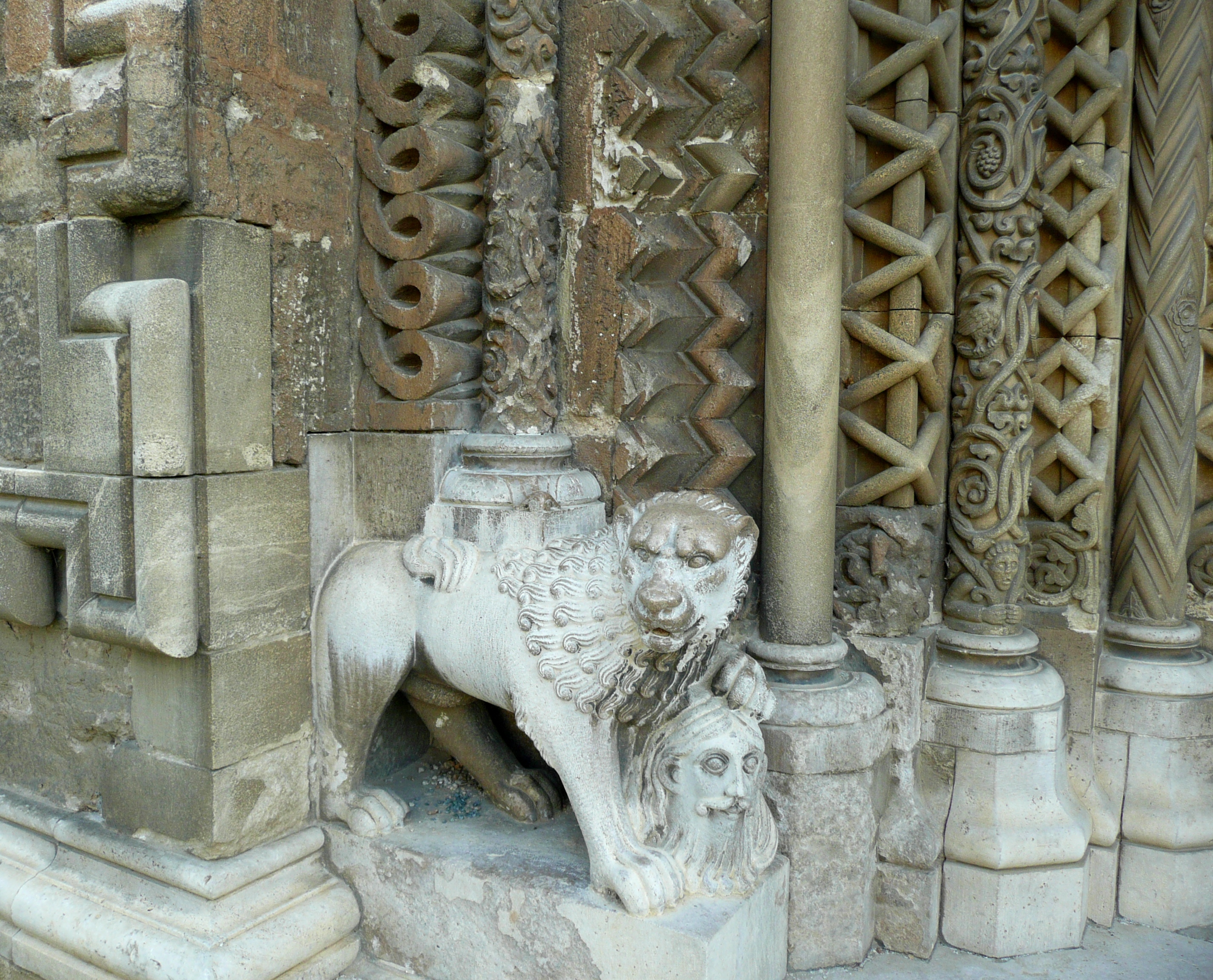

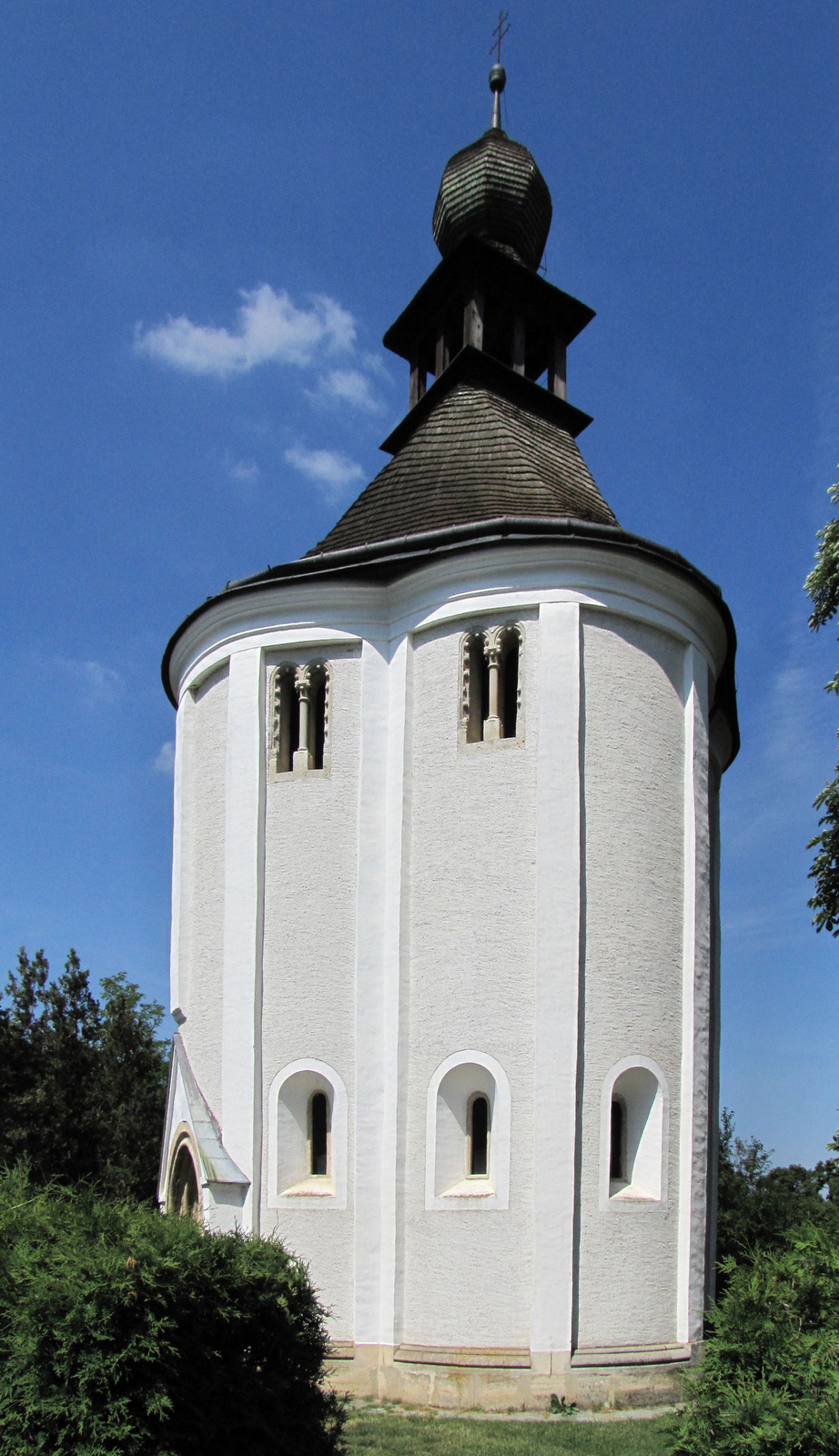
Saint James's Chapel, Ják

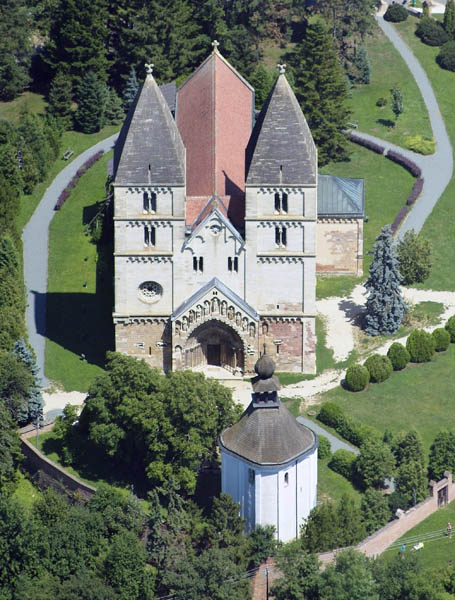

=== Interior of the church of Ják ===
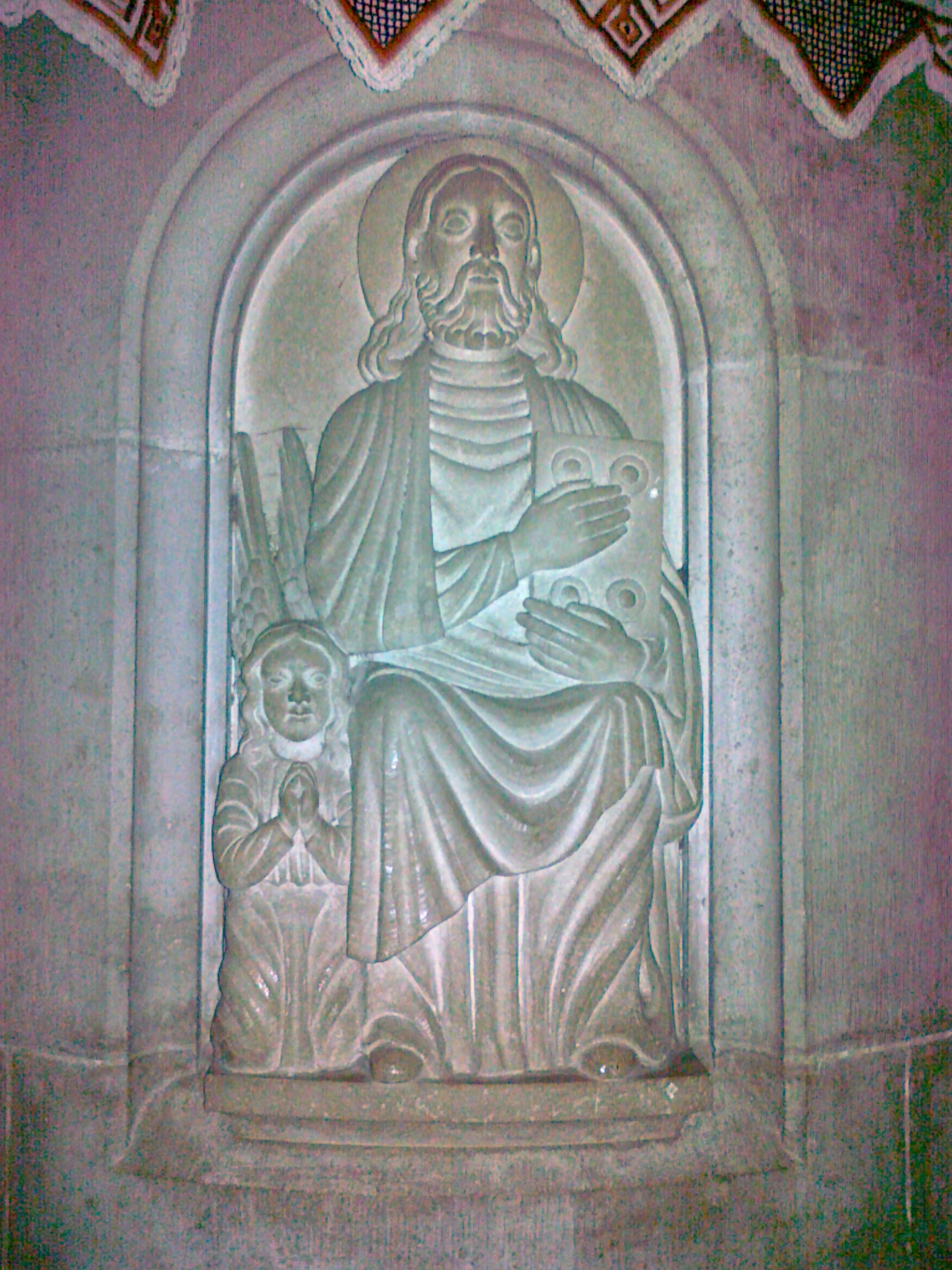
Medieval relief of Saint Matthew in the Church of Ják (13th century).

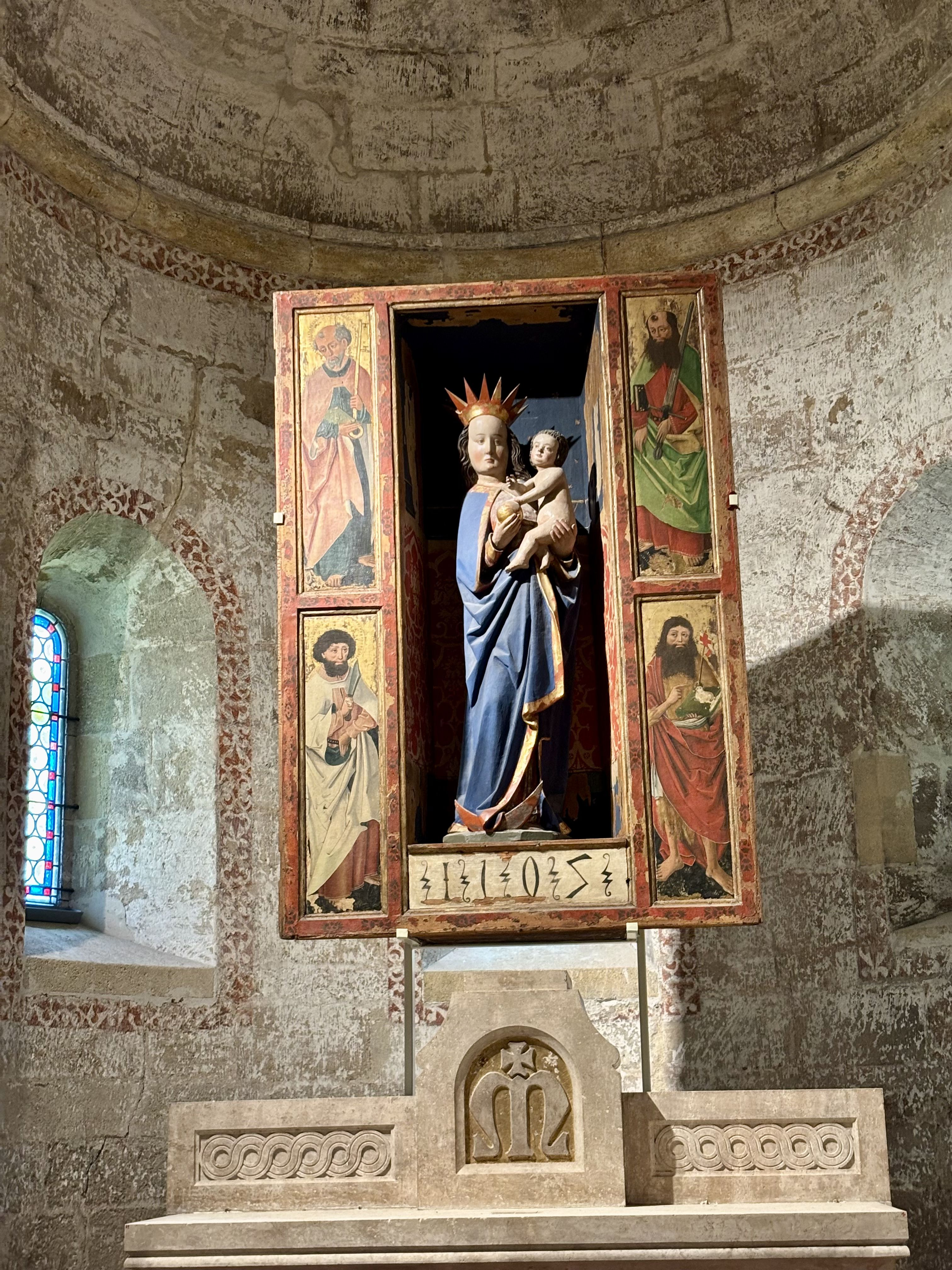

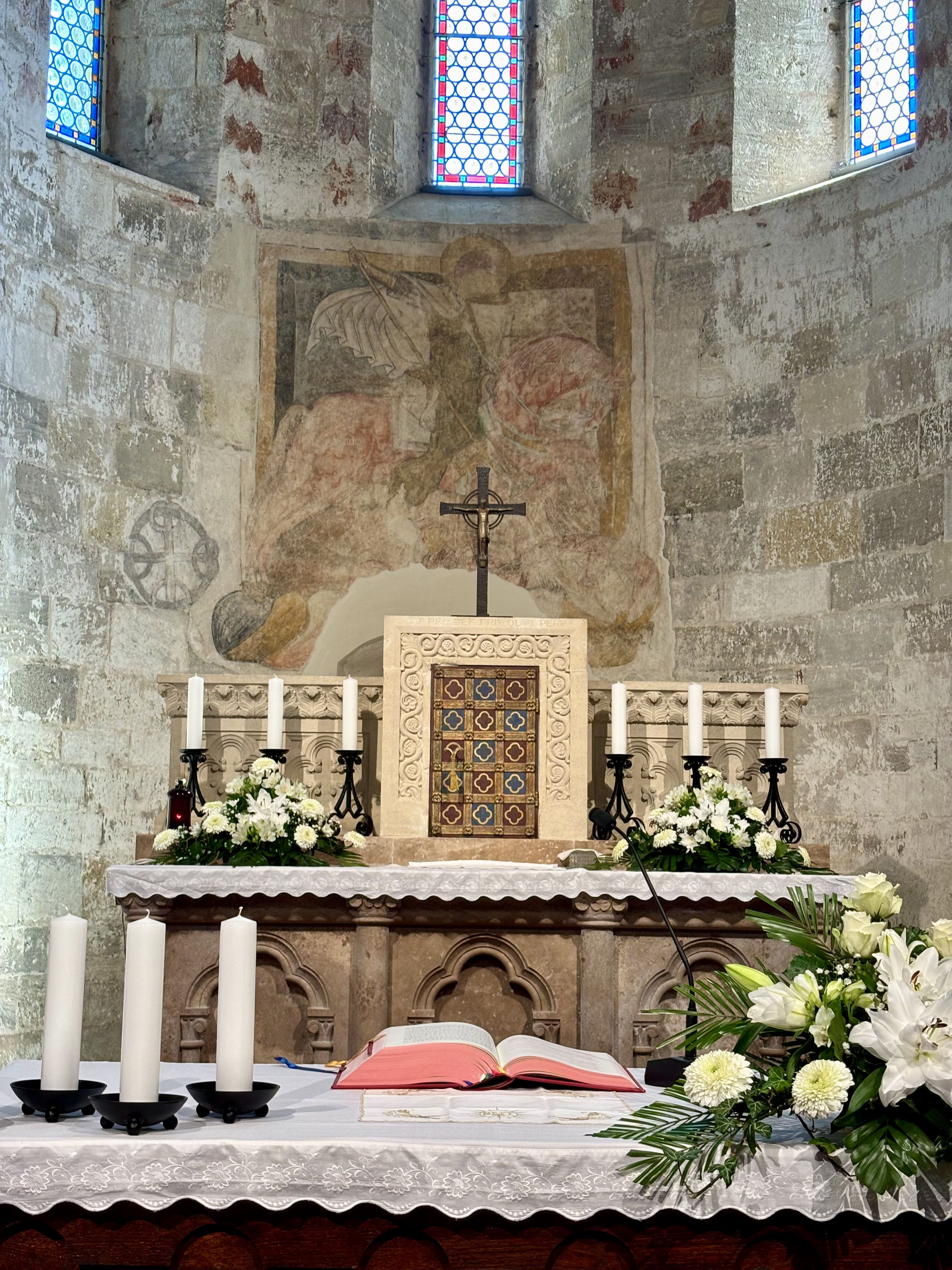

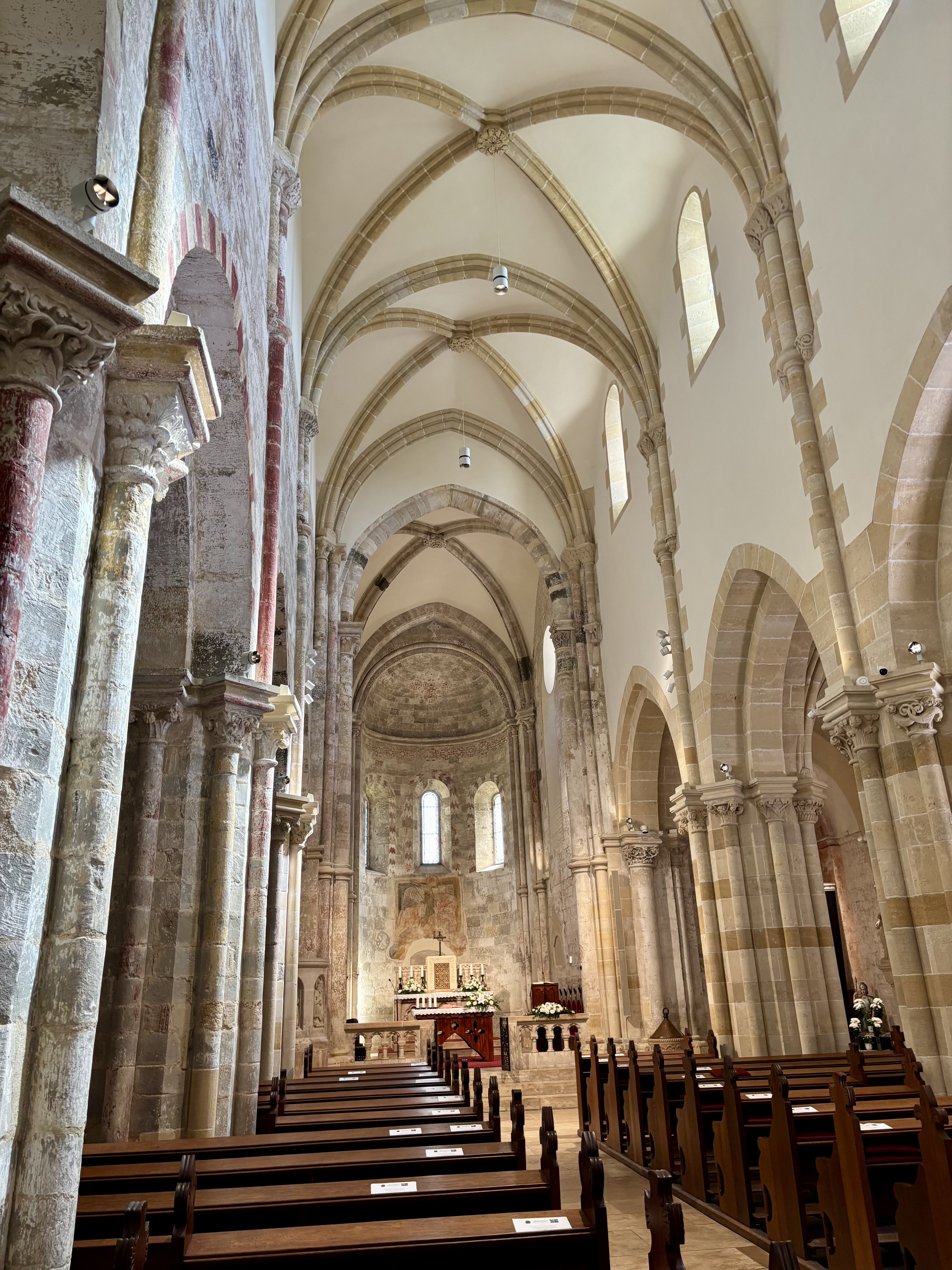

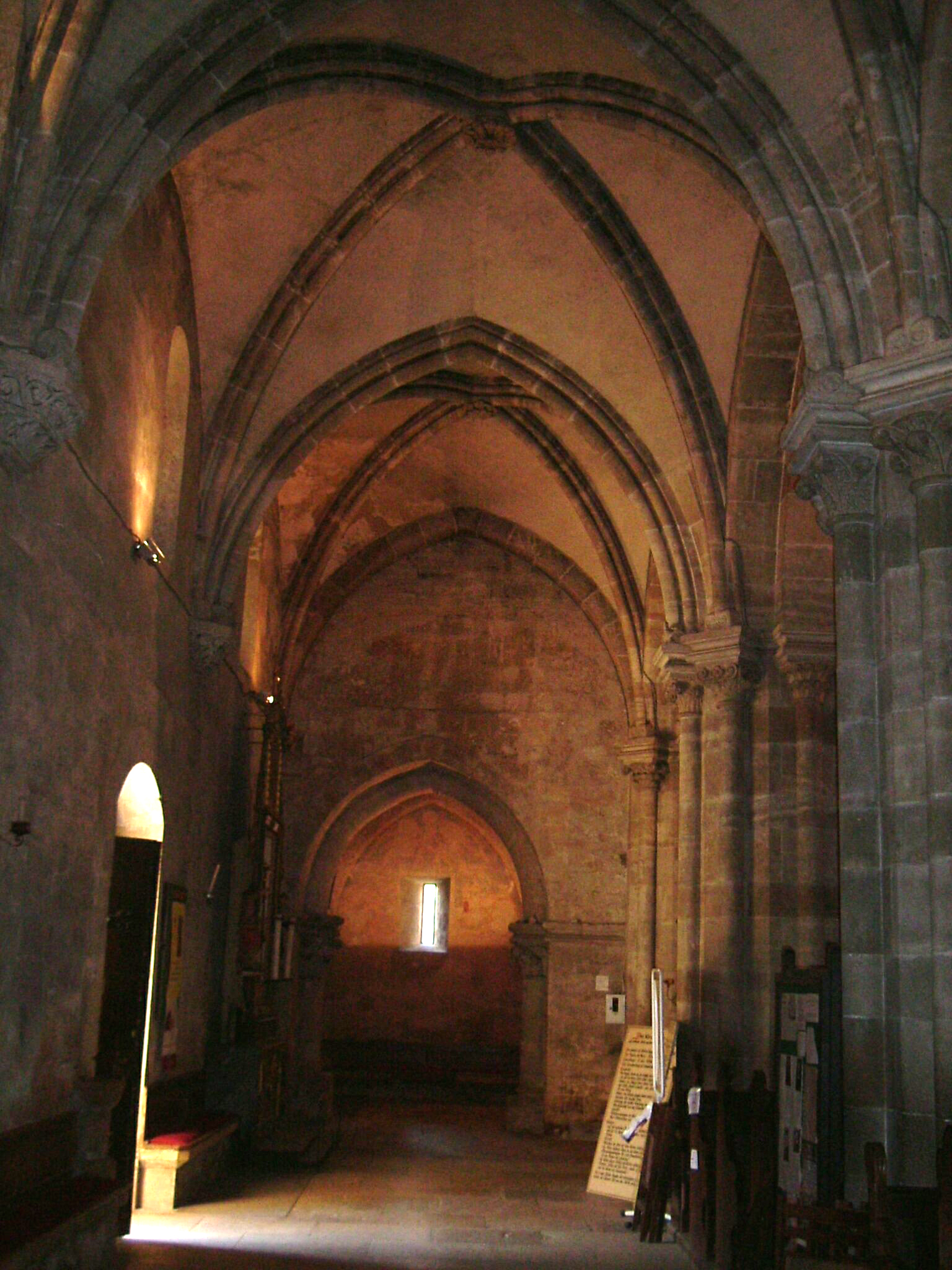

== Notable people ==
- Dezső Novák (1939 – 2014), Hungarian footballer
