= Leopold Óváry =

Hungarian Historian

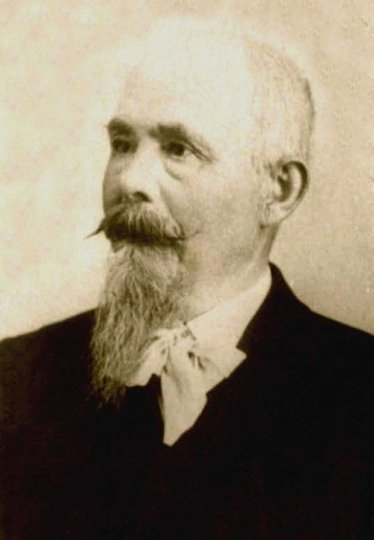
Portrait from the 1900s

Lipót Óváry, also known in English as Leopold Óváry (31 December 1833, Veszprém - 4 April 1919, Budapest) was a Hungarian historian and custodian of the Hungarian state archives. He took part in the Hungarian struggle for liberty in 1848 and in the Italian war of independence in 1859. After the political troubles had been settled he devoted himself to the study of history, in which he soon achieved distinction. In 1876 he was appointed assistant custodian of the state archives, in 1904 chief custodian; and in 1892 he was elected a member of the Hungarian Academy of Sciences. A knighthood of the Order of the Crown of Italy was conferred upon him.

Óváry's writings had considerable political influence, especially those attacking the anti-Hungarian Romanian propaganda in Italy. His chief works include: Nápolyi Történelmi Kutatások (Budapest, 1874); III. Pál Pápa s Farnese Sándor Bibornok Magyarországra Vonatkozó Diplomácziai Levelezései (ib. 1879); Oklevéltár Bethlen Gábor Diplomácziai Összeköttetéseinek Történetéhez (ib. 1886); Zsigmond Királly és az Olasz Diplomaczia (ib. 1889); A Magyar Anjouk Eredete (ib. 1893); La Questione Dacoromana e lo Stato Ungherese (Rome, 1894; German ed., Budapest, 1894; French ed., Paris, 1894). Óváry embraced Christianity.
