= Nagykölked =

- Coat of arms

- Location of Nagykölked in Hungary
- Coordinates: 47°03′56″N 16°33′08″E
- Country: Hungary
- Region: Western Transdanubia
- County: Vas
- Subregion: Körmendi
- Rank: Village

Area
  - Total: 9.78 km^{2} (3.78 sq mi)

Population (1 January 2008)
  - Total: 159
  - Density: 16.3/km^{2} (42.1/sq mi)
- Time zone: UTC+1 (CET)
  - Summer (DST): UTC+2 (CEST)
- Postal code: 9784
- Area code: +36 94
- KSH code: 32920

Nagykölked (Slovene: Veliki Kuked) is a village in Vas county, Hungary.
