= Pornóapáti =

Pornóapáti Pernau
- Village
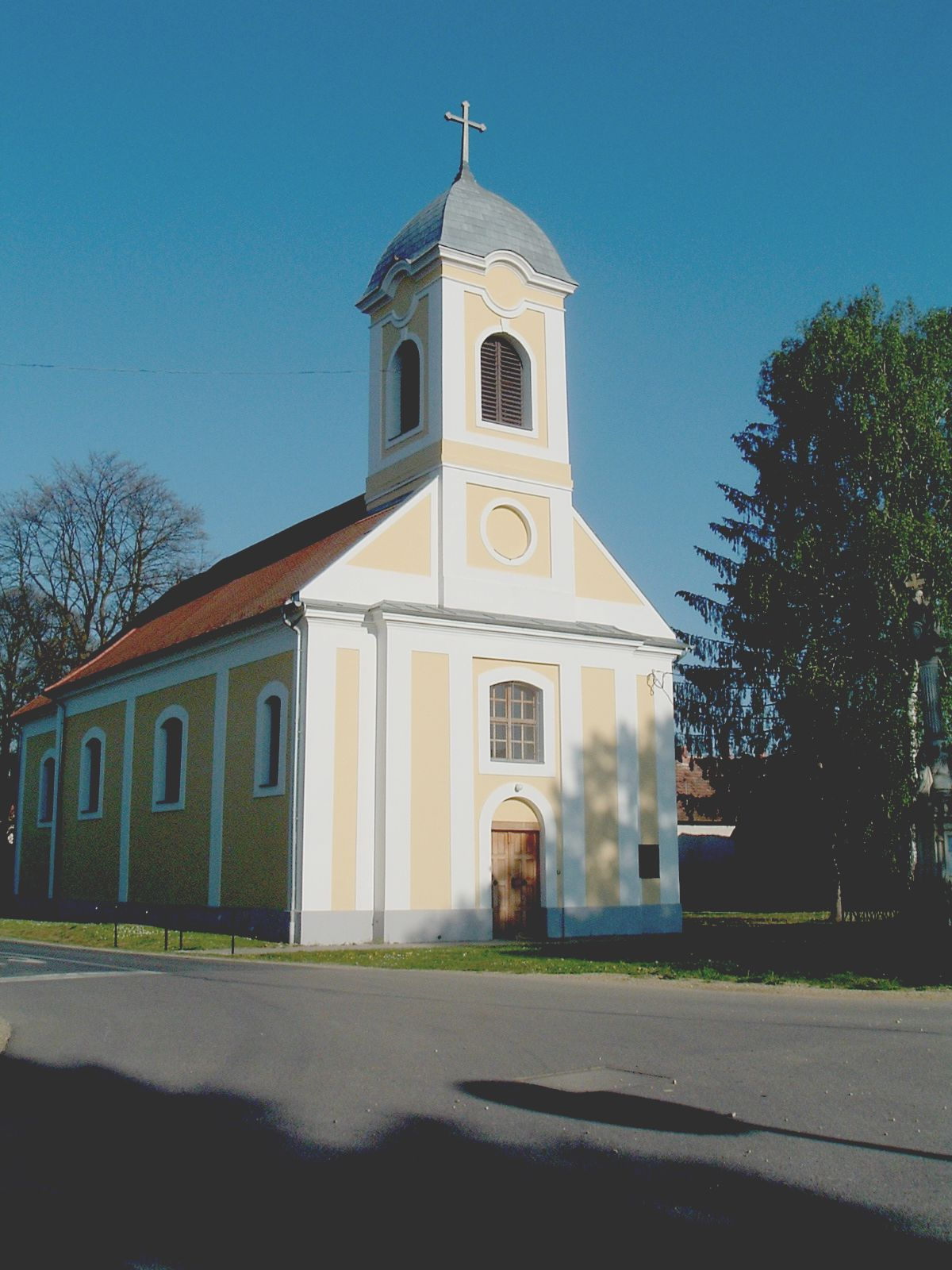

- Flag Coat of arms
- Interactive map of Pornóapáti
- Location of Pornóapáti
- Coordinates: 47.156111°N 16.465556°E
- Country: Hungary
- Region: Western Transdanubia
- County: Vas
- District: Szombathely

Area
  - Total: 15.14 km^{2} (5.85 sq mi)

Population (1 January 2025)
  - Total: 377
  - Density: 24.9/km^{2} (64.5/sq mi)
- Time zone: UTC+1 (CET)
  - Summer (DST): UTC+2 (CEST)
- Postal code: 9796
- Area code: (+36) 94
- Website: www.pornoapati.hu

Pornóapáti (until 1899: Pornó; German: Pernau; Croatian: Pornova) is a village in Vas County, Hungary, situated on the river Pinka and Hungary's border with Austria.

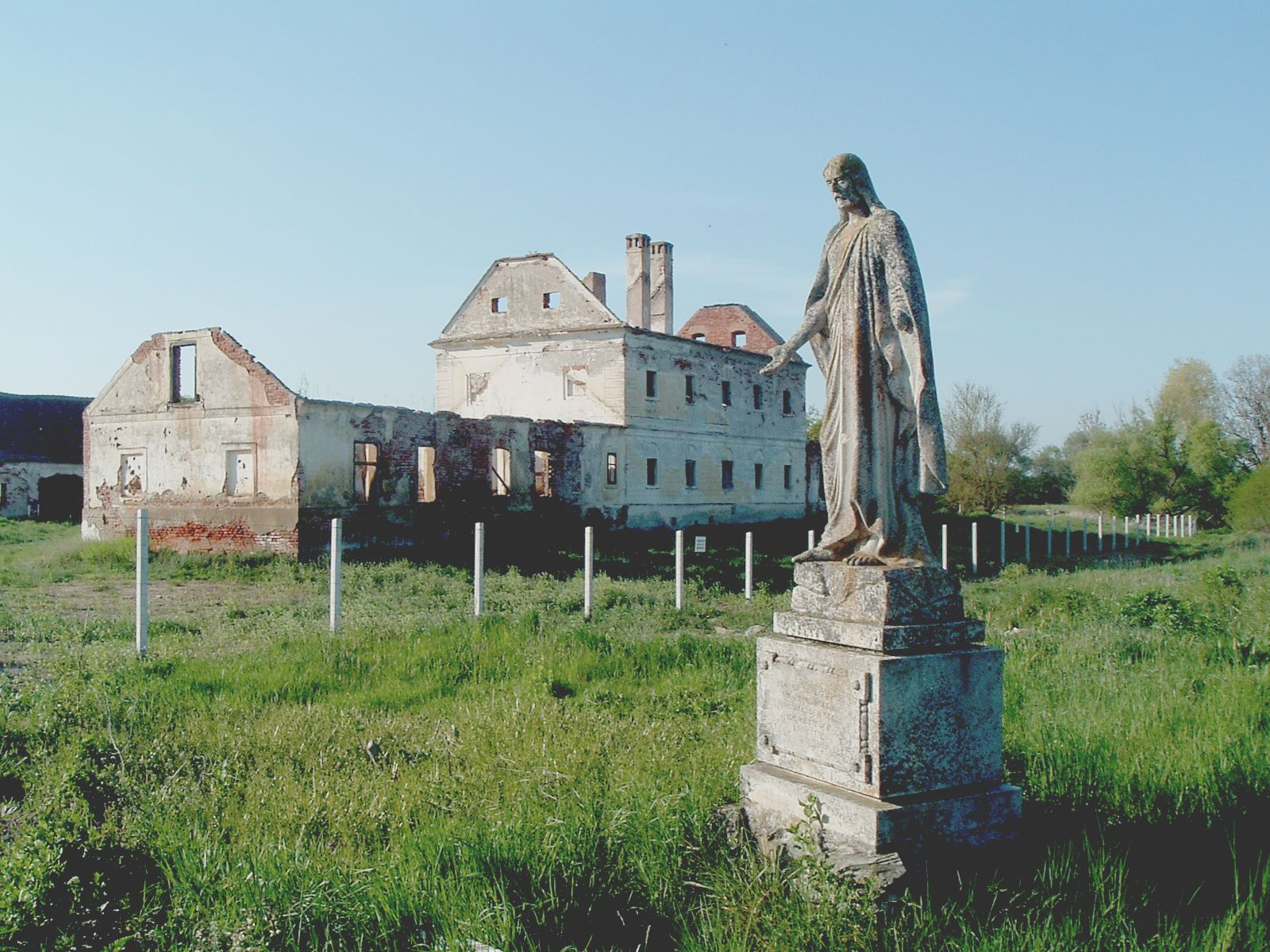
remains of the former monastery

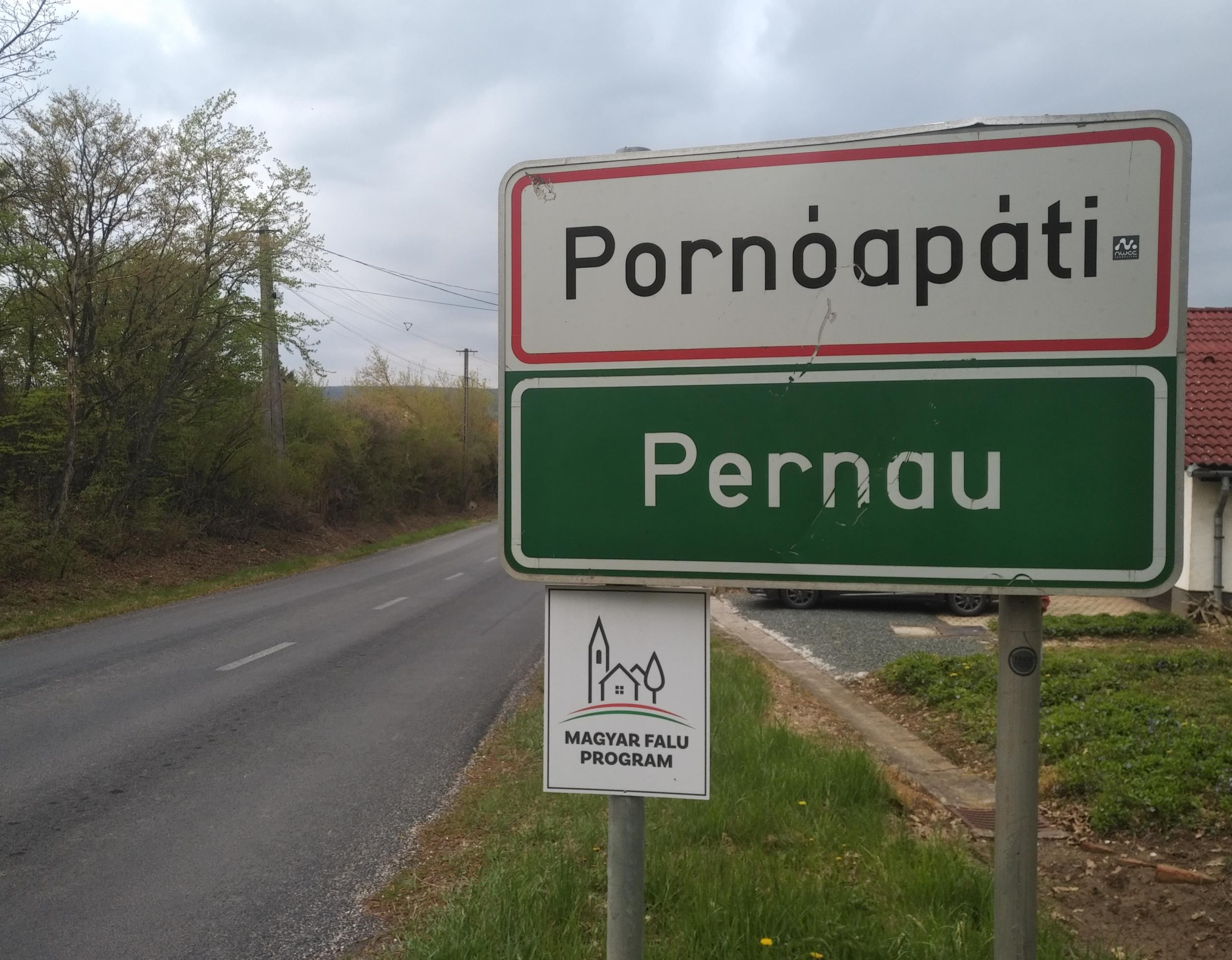
sign in Hungarian and German
