= National Archives of Hungary =

Coordinates: 47°30′18″N 19°01′48″E

The National Archives of Hungary (in Hungarian: Magyar Nemzeti Levéltár) were created in 1756. They were first located in Pressburg, Upper Hungary (now Bratislava, Slovakia). In 1784, they were transferred to Buda.

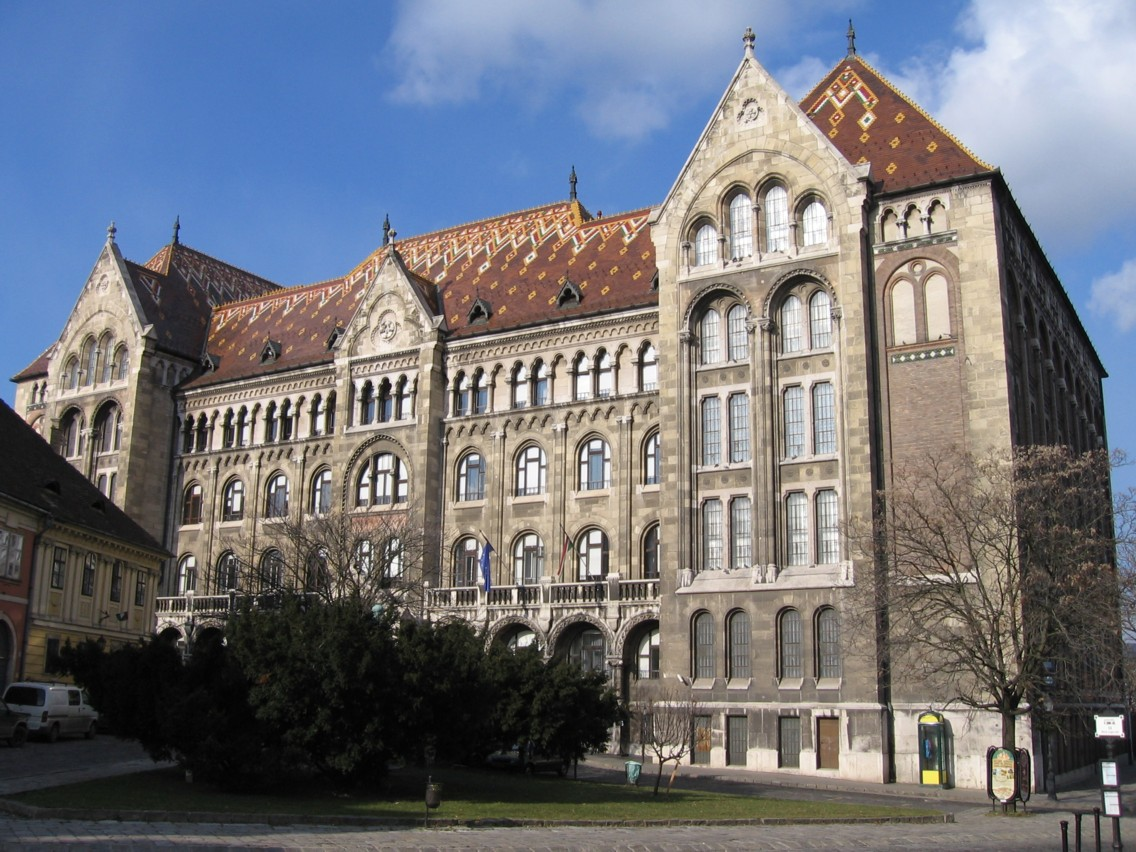
National Archives of Hungary, Budapest

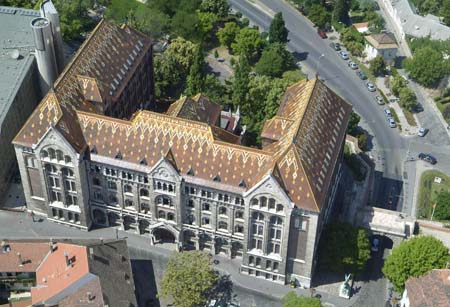
Aerial photography of the building

The National Archives of Hungary is the nation's record keeper. Archival work in the 21st century is to collect, to catalog, and to restore historic documents, but also to serve the needs of society and the citizens, and provide them assistance in their research into history.

== See also ==
- Ottoman Archives
- State Archives of Venice
- Dubrovnik Archive
- List of national archives
- Leopold Óváry
