= Bildein =

- Municipality
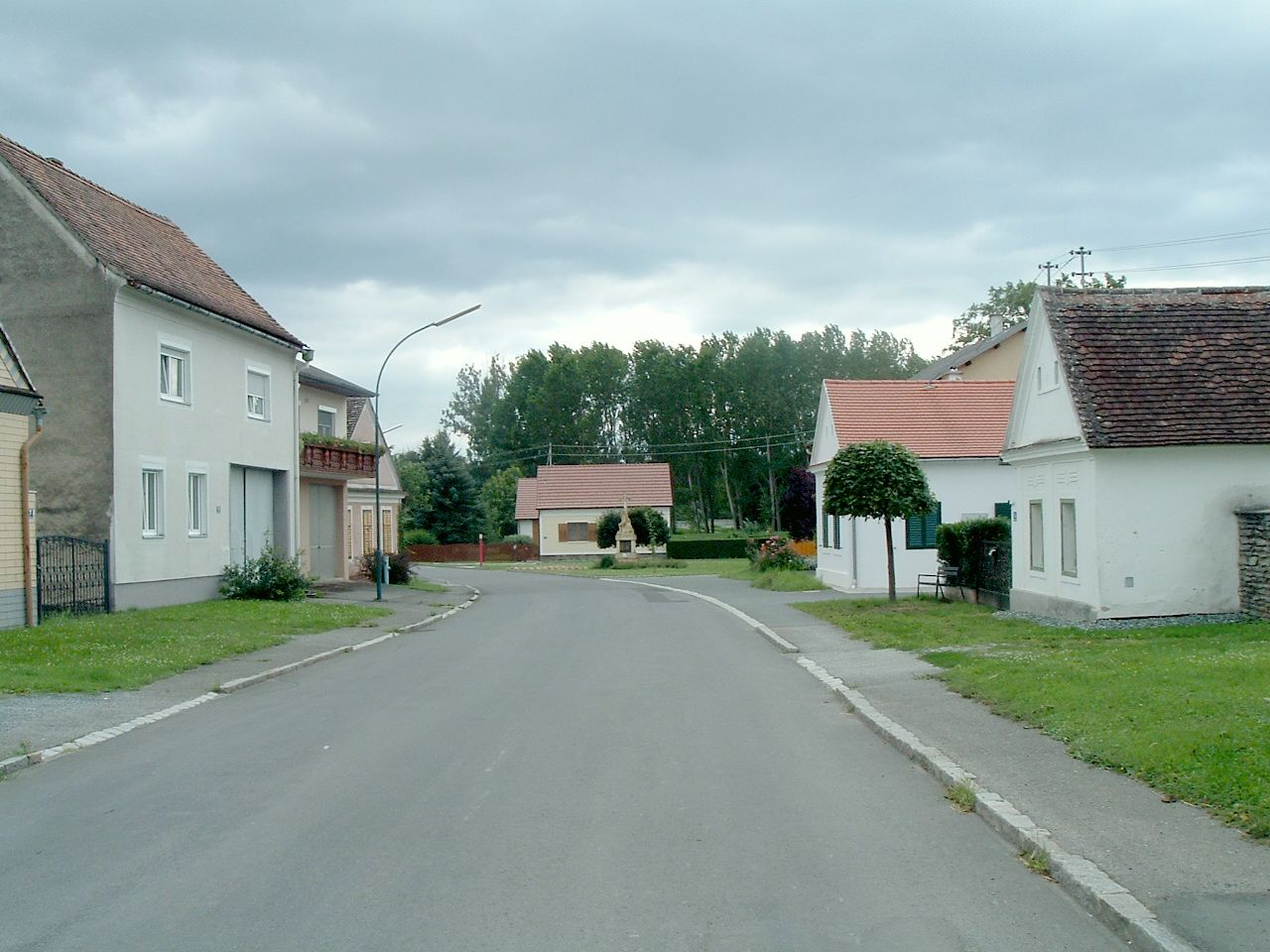

- Coat of arms

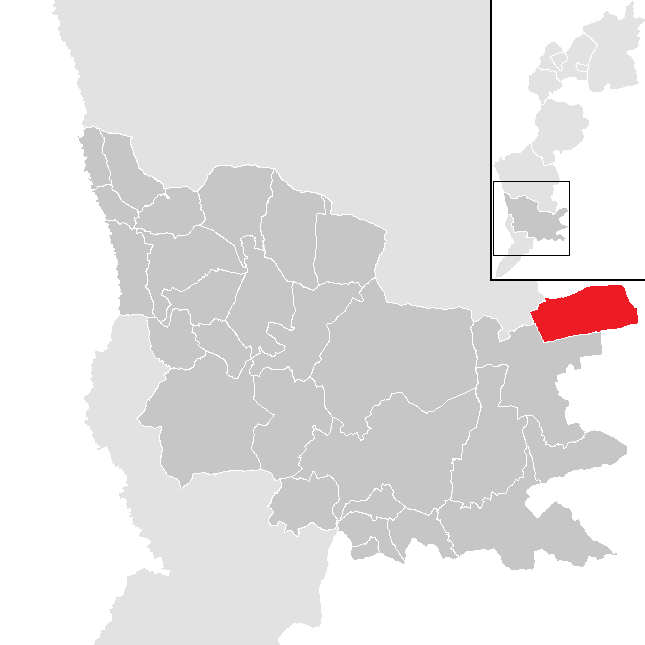
- Location within Güssing district

- Location within Austria
- Coordinates: 47°8′N 16°28′E
- Country: Austria
- State: Burgenland
- District: Güssing

Government
  - Mayor: Emmerich Zax (ÖVP)

Area
  - Total: 15.91 km^{2} (6.14 sq mi)
- Elevation: 225 m (738 ft)

Population (2018-01-01)
  - Total: 343
  - Density: 21.6/km^{2} (55.8/sq mi)
- Time zone: UTC+1 (CET)
  - Summer (DST): UTC+2 (CEST)
- Postal code: 7521
- Website: www.bildein.at

Bildein (German pronunciation: [bɪlˈdaɪ̯n], Hungarian: Beled) is a town in the district of Güssing in the Austrian state of Burgenland.

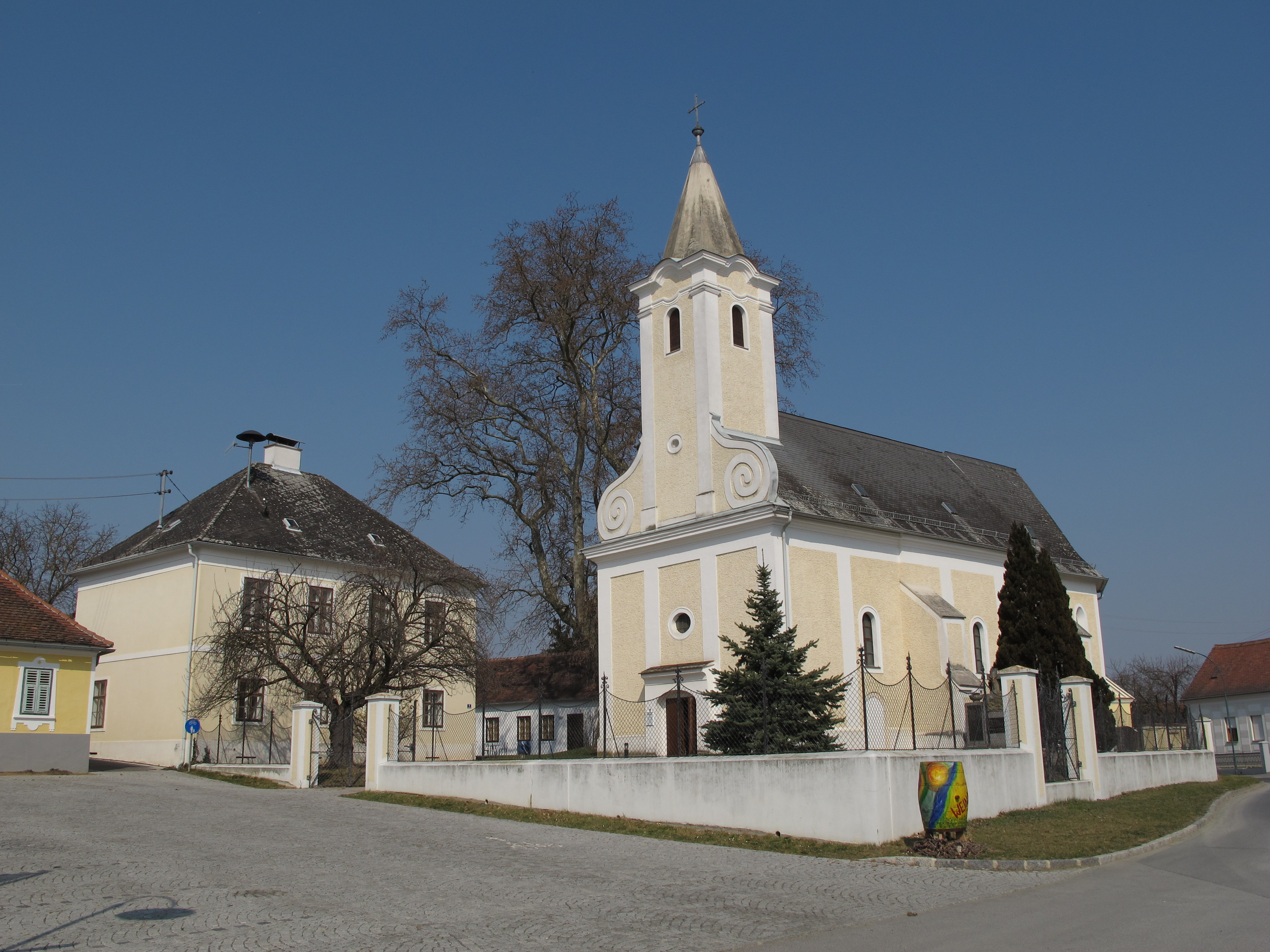
Church in Bildein

== Population ==
Historical population
Year	Pop.	±%
1869	703	—
1880	766	+9.0%
1890	790	+3.1%
1900	821	+3.9%
1910	818	−0.4%
1923	766	−6.4%
1934	727	−5.1%
1939	753	+3.6%
1951	658	−12.6%
1961	617	−6.2%
1971	563	−8.8%
1981	464	−17.6%
1991	380	−18.1%
2001	373	−1.8%
2011	340	−8.8%
2011	334	−1.8%
