= List of populated places in Hungary (M) =

This is a list of cities, towns and villages of Hungary

KEY: T = Town ; V = Village

Name	Rank	County	District	Population	Post code
Mád	V	Borsod-Abaúj-Zemplén	Szerencsi	2,605	3909
Madaras	V	Bács-Kiskun	Bácsalmási	3,233	6456
Madocsa	V	Tolna	Paksi	1,963	7026
Maglóca	V	Gyor-Moson-Sopron	Csornai	104	9169
Maglód	V	Pest	Monori	9,999	2234
Mágocs	V	Baranya	Sásdi	2,679	7342
Magosliget	V	Szabolcs-Szatmár-Bereg	Fehérgyarmati	241	4953
Magy	V	Szabolcs-Szatmár-Bereg	Baktalórántházai	996	4556
Magyaralmás	V	Fejér	Móri	1,497	8071
Magyaratád	V	Somogy	Kaposvári	979	7463
Magyarbánhegyes	V	Békés	Mezőkovácsházi	2,687	5667
Magyarbóly	V	Baranya	Siklósi	1,056	7775
Magyarcsanád	V	Csongrád	Makói	1,629	6932
Magyardombegyház	V	Békés	Mezőkovácsházi	296	5838
Magyaregregy	V	Baranya	Komlói	831	7332
Magyaregres	V	Somogy	Kaposvári	597	7441
Magyarföld	V	Zala	Lenti	34	8973
Magyargéc	V	Nógrád	Szécsényi	856	3133
Magyargencs	V	Veszprém	Pápai	618	8517
Magyarhertelend	V	Baranya	Komlói	668	7394
Magyarhomorog	V	Hajdú-Bihar	Berettyóújfalui	930	4137
Magyarkeresztúr	V	Gyor-Moson-Sopron	Csornai	505	9346
Magyarkeszi	V	Tolna	Tamási	1,371	7098
Magyarlak	V	Vas	Szentgotthárdi	781	9962
Magyarlukafa	V	Baranya	Szigetvári	99	7925
Magyarmecske	V	Baranya	Sellyei	353	7954
Magyarnádalja	V	Vas	Körmendi	192	9909
Magyarnándor	V	Nógrád	Balassagyarmati	1,205	2694
Magyarpolány	V	Veszprém	Ajkai	1,184	8449
Magyarsarlós	V	Baranya	Pécsi	339	7761
Magyarszecsőd	V	Vas	Körmendi	485	9912
Magyarszék	V	Baranya	Komlói	1,138	7396
Magyarszentmiklós	V	Zala	Nagykanizsai	277	8776
Magyarszerdahely	V	Zala	Nagykanizsai	561	8776
Magyarszombatfa	V	Vas	Oriszentpéteri	294	9946
Magyartelek	V	Baranya	Sellyei	239	7954
Majosháza	V	Pest	Ráckevei	1,240	2339
Majs	V	Baranya	Mohácsi	1,095	7783
Makád	V	Pest	Ráckevei	1,306	2322
Makkoshotyka	V	Borsod-Abaúj-Zemplén	Sárospataki	983	3959
Maklár	V	Heves	Egri	2,801	3397
Makó	T	Csongrád	Makói	25,534	6900
Malomsok	V	Veszprém	Pápai	576	8533
Mályi	V	Borsod-Abaúj-Zemplén	Miskolci	4,209	3434
Mályinka	V	Borsod-Abaúj-Zemplén	Kazincbarcikai	562	3645
Mánd	V	Szabolcs-Szatmár-Bereg	Fehérgyarmati	266	4942
Mándok	V	Szabolcs-Szatmár-Bereg	Kisvárdai	4,552	4644
Mánfa	V	Baranya	Komlói	896	7304
Mány	V	Fejér	Bicskei	2,321	2065
Maráza	V	Baranya	Mohácsi	207	7733
Marcalgergelyi	V	Veszprém	Pápai	450	9534
Marcali	T	Somogy	Marcali	12,550	8700
Marcaltő	V	Veszprém	Pápai	876	8532
Márfa	V	Baranya	Siklósi	225	7817
Máriahalom	V	Komárom-Esztergom	Dorogi	667	2527
Máriakálnok	V	Gyor-Moson-Sopron	Mosonmagyaróvári	1,483	9231
Máriakéménd	V	Baranya	Mohácsi	548	7663
Márianosztra	V	Pest	Szobi	968	2629
Máriapócs	T	Szabolcs-Szatmár-Bereg	Nyírbátori	2,172	4326
Markaz	V	Heves	Gyöngyösi	2,561	3262
Márkháza	V	Nógrád	Bátonyterenyei	237	3075
Márkó	V	Veszprém	Veszprémi	1,141	8441
Markóc	V	Baranya	Sellyei	57	7967
Markotabödöge	V	Gyor-Moson-Sopron	Csornai	499	9164
Maróc	V	Zala	Letenyei	119	8888
Marócsa	V	Baranya	Sellyei	123	7960
Márok	V	Baranya	Siklósi	529	7774
Márokföld	V	Zala	Lenti	51	8976
Márokpapi	V	Szabolcs-Szatmár-Bereg	Vásárosnaményi	456	4932
Maroslele	V	Csongrád	Makói	2,217	6921
Mártély	V	Csongrád	Hódmezővásárhelyi	1,342	6636
Martfű	T	Jász-Nagykun-Szolnok	Szolnoki	7,313	5435
Martonfa	V	Baranya	Pécsváradi	205	7720
Martonvásár	V	Fejér	Ercsi	5,275	2462
Martonyi	V	Borsod-Abaúj-Zemplén	Edelényi	560	3755
Mátészalka	T	Szabolcs-Szatmár-Bereg	Mátészalkai	18,558	4700
Mátételke	V	Bács-Kiskun	Bácsalmási	616	6452
Mátraballa	V	Heves	Pétervásárai	2,635	3247
Mátraderecske	V	Heves	Pétervásárai	1,399	3246
Mátramindszent	V	Nógrád	Bátonyterenyei	925	3155
Mátranovák	V	Nógrád	Bátonyterenyei	1,986	3143
Mátraszele	V	Nógrád	Salgótarjáni	1,071	3142
Mátraszentimre	V	Heves	Gyöngyösi	2,129	3235
Mátraszolos	V	Nógrád	Pásztói	1,703	3068
Mátraterenye	V	Nógrád	Bátonyterenyei	2,011	3145
Mátraverebély	V	Nógrád	Bátonyterenyei	2,252	3077
Mátyásdomb	V	Fejér	Enyingi	803	8134
Matty	V	Baranya	Siklósi	383	7854
Mátyus	V	Szabolcs-Szatmár-Bereg	Vásárosnaményi	373	4835
Máza	V	Baranya	Komlói	1,393	7351
Mecseknádasd	V	Baranya	Pécsváradi	1,660	7695
Mecsekpölöske	V	Baranya	Komlói	459	7300
Mecsér	V	Gyor-Moson-Sopron	Mosonmagyaróvári	630	9176
Medgyesbodzás	V	Békés	Mezőkovácsházi	1,217	5663
Medgyesegyháza	V	Békés	Mezőkovácsházi	4,104	5666
Medina	V	Tolna	Szekszárdi	891	7057
Megyaszó	V	Borsod-Abaúj-Zemplén	Szerencsi	3,118	3718
Megyehíd	V	Vas	Sárvári	320	9754
Megyer	V	Veszprém	Sümegi	48	8348
Meggyeskovácsi	V	Vas	Sárvári	779	9757
Méhkerék	V	Békés	Sarkadi	2,313	5726
Méhtelek	V	Szabolcs-Szatmár-Bereg	Fehérgyarmati	765	4975
Mekényes	V	Baranya	Sásdi	303	7344
Mélykút	V	Bács-Kiskun	Jánoshalmi	5,744	6449
Mencshely	V	Veszprém	Veszprémi	272	8271
Mende	V	Pest	Monori	4,144	2235
Méra	V	Borsod-Abaúj-Zemplén	Encsi	1,826	3871
Merenye	V	Baranya	Szigetvári	319	7981
Mérges	V	Gyor-Moson-Sopron	Téti	79	9136
Mérk	V	Szabolcs-Szatmár-Bereg	Mátészalkai	2,328	4352
Mernye	V	Somogy	Kaposvári	1,601	7453
Mersevát	V	Vas	Celldömölki	588	9531
Mesterháza	V	Vas	Csepregi	175	9662
Mesteri	V	Vas	Celldömölki	286	9551
Mesterszállás	V	Jász-Nagykun-Szolnok	Mezőtúri	805	5452
Meszes	V	Borsod-Abaúj-Zemplén	Edelényi	218	3754
Meszlen	V	Vas	Szombathelyi	232	9745
Mesztegnyo	V	Somogy	Marcali	1,464	8716
Mezőberény	T	Békés	Békési	11,591	5650
Mezőcsát	T	Borsod-Abaúj-Zemplén	Mezőcsáti	6,594	3450
Mezőcsokonya	V	Somogy	Kaposvári	1,224	7434
Meződ	V	Baranya	Sásdi	149	7370
Mezőfalva	V	Fejér	Dunaújvárosi	4,908	2422
Mezőgyán	V	Békés	Sarkadi	1,277	5732
Mezőhegyes	T	Békés	Mezőkovácsházi	6,262	5820
Mezőhék	V	Jász-Nagykun-Szolnok	Mezőtúri	390	5453
Mezőkeresztes	V	Borsod-Abaúj-Zemplén	Mezőkövesdi	4,265	3441
Mezőkomárom	V	Fejér	Enyingi	1,063	8137
Mezőkovácsháza	T	Békés	Mezőkovácsházi	6,945	5800
Mezőkövesd	T	Borsod-Abaúj-Zemplén	Mezőkövesdi	17,841	3400
Mezőladány	V	Szabolcs-Szatmár-Bereg	Kisvárdai	1,024	4641
Mezőlak	V	Veszprém	Pápai	1,076	8514
Mezőnagymihály	V	Borsod-Abaúj-Zemplén	Mezőkövesdi	1,203	3443
Mezőnyárád	V	Borsod-Abaúj-Zemplén	Mezőkövesdi	1,724	3421
Mezőörs	V	Gyor-Moson-Sopron	Győri	1,005	9097
Mezőpeterd	V	Hajdú-Bihar	Berettyóújfalui	578	4118
Mezősas	V	Hajdú-Bihar	Berettyóújfalui	648	4134
Mezőszemere	V	Heves	Füzesabonyi	2,148	3378
Mezőszentgyörgy	V	Fejér	Enyingi	1,376	8133
Mezőszilas	V	Fejér	Sárbogárdi	2,340	7017
Mezőtárkány	V	Heves	Füzesabonyi	4,064	3375
Mezőtúr	T	Jász-Nagykun-Szolnok	Mezőtúri	19,284	5400
Mezőzombor	V	Borsod-Abaúj-Zemplén	Szerencsi	2,591	3931
Miháld	V	Zala	Nagykanizsai	921	8825
Mihályfa	V	Zala	Zalaszentgróti	415	8341
Mihálygerge	V	Nógrád	Salgótarjáni	683	3184
Mihályháza	V	Veszprém	Pápai	839	8513
Mihályi	V	Gyor-Moson-Sopron	Kapuvári	1,149	9342
Mike	V	Somogy	Kaposvári	722	7512
Mikebuda	V	Pest	Ceglédi	812	2736
Mikekarácsonyfa	V	Zala	Lenti	255	8949
Mikepércs	V	Hajdú-Bihar	Derecske–Létavértesi	3,520	4271
Miklósi	V	Somogy	Tabi	254	8669
Mikófalva	V	Heves	Bélapátfalvai	1,441	3344
Mikóháza	V	Borsod-Abaúj-Zemplén	Sátoraljaújhelyi	605	3989
Mikosszéplak	V	Vas	Vasvári	335	9835
Milejszeg	V	Zala	Zalaegerszegi	411	8917
Milota	V	Szabolcs-Szatmár-Bereg	Fehérgyarmati	868	4948
Mindszent	T	Csongrád	Hódmezővásárhelyi	7,387	6630
Mindszentgodisa	V	Baranya	Sásdi	1,017	7391
Mindszentkálla	V	Veszprém	Tapolcai	327	8282
Misefa	V	Zala	Zalaegerszegi	298	8935
Miske	V	Bács-Kiskun	Kalocsai	1,868	6343
Miskolc	county seat	Borsod-Abaúj-Zemplén	Miskolci	181,565	3500^{*}
Miszla	V	Tolna	Tamási	347	7065
Mocsa	V	Komárom-Esztergom	Komáromi	2,299	2911
Mogyoród	V	Pest	Gödölloi	4,988	2146
Mogyorósbánya	V	Komárom-Esztergom	Esztergomi	877	2535
Mogyoróska	V	Borsod-Abaúj-Zemplén	Abaúj–Hegyközi	73	3893
Moha	V	Fejér	Székesfehérvári	425	8042
Mohács	T	Baranya	Mohácsi	19,049	7700
Mohora	V	Nógrád	Balassagyarmati	983	2698
Molnári	V	Zala	Letenyei	782	8863
Mesztegnyő	V	Vas	Körmendi	415	9912
Molvány	V	Baranya	Szigetvári	231	7981
Monaj	V	Borsod-Abaúj-Zemplén	Szikszói	307	3812
Monok	V	Borsod-Abaúj-Zemplén	Szerencsi	1,791	3905
Monor	T	Pest	Monori	21,227	2200
Mónosbél	V	Heves	Bélapátfalvai	1,378	3345
Monostorapáti	V	Veszprém	Tapolcai	1,095	8296
Monostorpályi	V	Hajdú-Bihar	Derecske–Létavértesi	2,236	4275
Monoszló	V	Veszprém	Balatonfüredi	162	8273
Monyoród	V	Baranya	Mohácsi	207	7751
Mór	T	Fejér	Móri	14,796	8060
Mórágy	V	Tolna	Bonyhádi	786	7165
Mórahalom	T	Csongrád	Mórahalmi	5,643	6782
Móricgát	V	Bács-Kiskun	Kiskunfélegyházi	572	6132
Mórichida	V	Gyor-Moson-Sopron	Téti	860	9131
Mosdós	V	Somogy	Kaposvári	1,110	7257
Mosonmagyaróvár	T	Gyor-Moson-Sopron	Mosonmagyaróvári	30,283	9200
Mosonszentmiklós	V	Gyor-Moson-Sopron	Mosonmagyaróvári	2,496	9154
Mosonszolnok	V	Gyor-Moson-Sopron	Mosonmagyaróvári	1,585	9245
Mozsgó	V	Baranya	Szigetvári	1,132	7932
Mocsény	V	Tolna	Bonyhádi	387	7163
Mucsfa	V	Tolna	Bonyhádi	428	7185
Mucsi	V	Tolna	Tamási	558	7195
Múcsony	V	Borsod-Abaúj-Zemplén	Kazincbarcikai	3,486	3744
Muhi	V	Borsod-Abaúj-Zemplén	Miskolci	549	3552
Murakeresztúr	V	Zala	Nagykanizsai	1,975	8834
Murarátka	V	Zala	Letenyei	286	8868
Muraszemenye	V	Zala	Letenyei	652	8872
Murga	V	Tolna	Szekszárdi	84	7176
Murony	V	Békés	Békési	1,454	5672

== Notes ==
- Cities marked with * have several different post codes, the one here is only the most general one.
