= Nagykanizsa District =

Nagykanizsa District Nagykanizsai járás
- Districts of Hungary
- Coat of arms

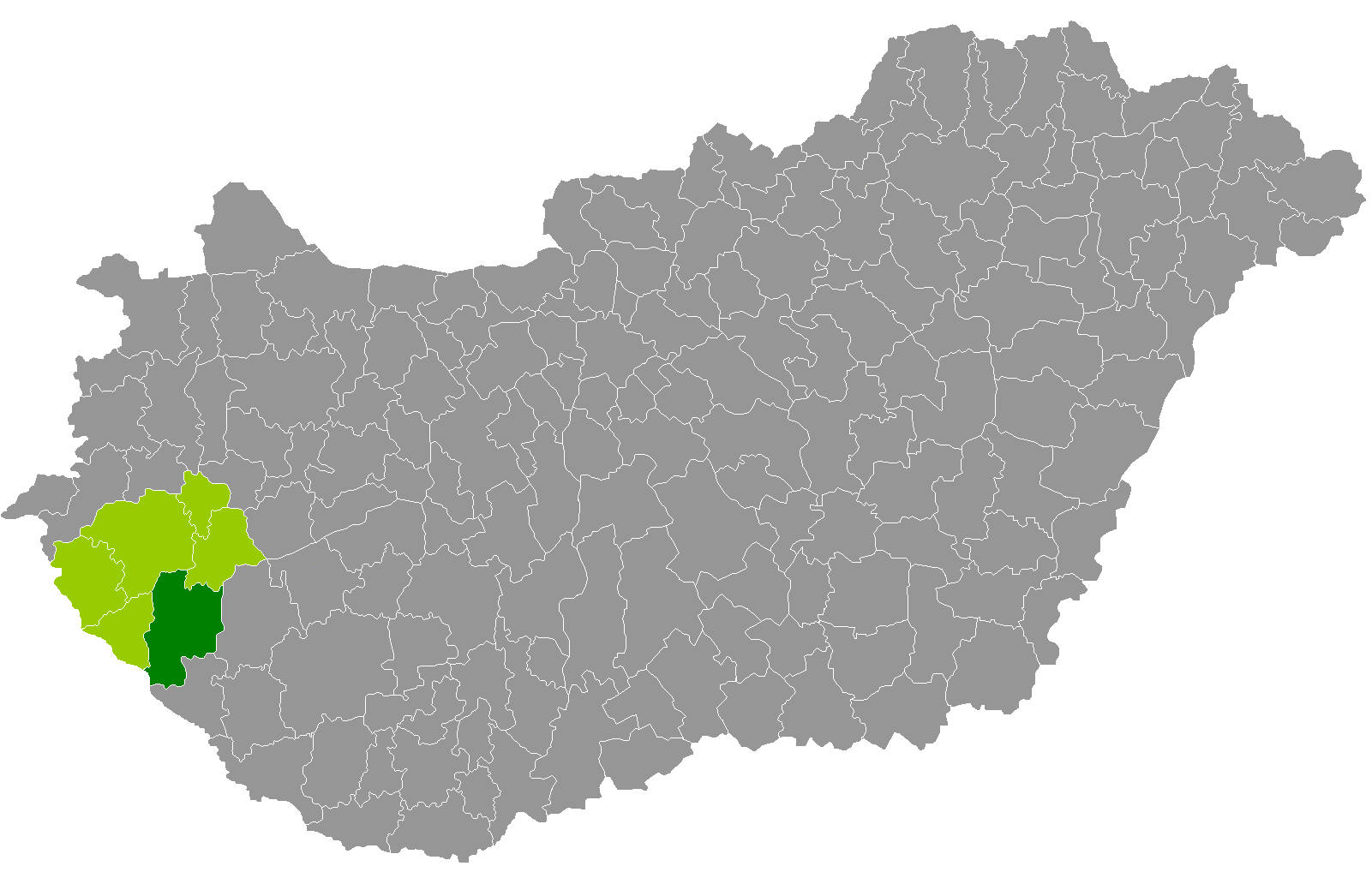
- Nagykanizsa District within Hungary and Zala County.
- Coordinates: 46.46°N 17.00°E
- Country: Hungary
- County: Zala
- District seat: Nagykanizsa

Area
  - Total: 907.91 km^{2} (350.55 sq mi)
  - Rank: 2nd in Zala

Population (2011 census)
  - Total: 78,252
  - Rank: 2nd in Zala
  - Density: 86/km^{2} (220/sq mi)

Nagykanizsa (Hungarian: Nagykanizsai járás) is a district in southern part of Zala County. Nagykanizsa is also the name of the town where the district seat is found. The district is located in the Western Transdanubia Statistical Region.

== Geography ==
Nagykanizsa District borders with Zalaegerszeg District and Keszthely District to the north, Marcali District (Somogy County) to the east, Csurgó District (Somogy County) to the south, the Croatian county of Koprivnica-Križevci and Lenti District to the west. The number of the inhabited places in Nagykanizsa District is 49.

== Municipalities ==
The district has 1 urban county, 1 town and 47 villages. (ordered by population, as of 1 January 2013)

- Alsórajk (358)
- Balatonmagyaród (456)
- Belezna (748)
- Bocska (313)
- Börzönce (54)
- Csapi (169)
- Eszteregnye (686)
- Felsőrajk (762)
- Fityeház (649)
- Fűzvölgy (124)
- Galambok (1,244)
- Garabonc (715)
- Gelse (1,118)
- Gelsesziget (268)
- Hahót (1,066)
- Homokkomárom (193)
- Hosszúvölgy (167)
- Kacorlak (197)
- Kerecseny (237)
- Kilimán (237)
- Kisrécse (189)
- Liszó (369)
- Magyarszentmiklós (255)
- Magyarszerdahely (528)
- Miháld (786)
- Murakeresztúr (1,741)
- Nagybakónak (408)
- **Nagykanizsa** (49,070) – district seat
- Nagyrada (465)
- Nagyrécse (1,083)
- Nemespátró (286)
- Orosztony (422)
- Pat (226)
- Pölöskefő (390)
- Pötréte (245)
- Rigyác (391)
- Sand (404)
- Sormás (872)
- Surd (615)
- Szepetnek (1,589)
- Újudvar (960)
- **Zalakaros** (1,849)
- Zalakomár (2,982)
- Zalamerenye (173)
- Zalasárszeg (126)
- Zalaszabar (560)
- Zalaszentbalázs (838)
- Zalaszentjakab (321)
- Zalaújlak (118)

The bolded municipalities are cities.

== See also ==
- List of cities and towns in Hungary
