= Újudvar =

- Village
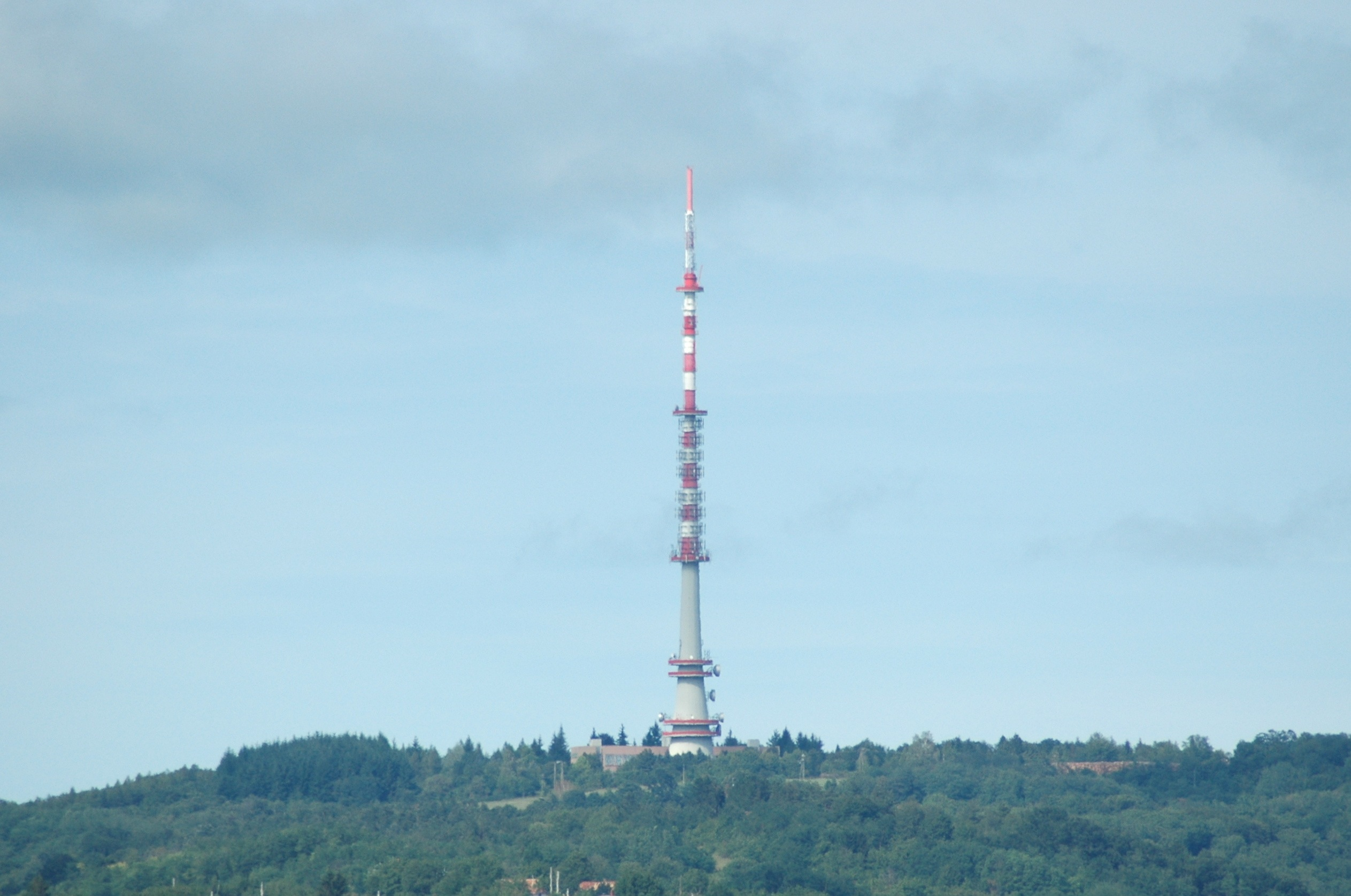

- Flag Coat of arms

- Location of Újudvar
- Coordinates: 46.54105°N 16.99194°E
- Country: Hungary
- Region: Western Transdanubia
- County: Zala
- District: Nagykanizsa

Area
  - Total: 16.31 km^{2} (6.30 sq mi)

Population (1 January 2026)
  - Total: 902
  - Density: 55.3/km^{2} (143/sq mi)
- Time zone: UTC+1 (CET)
  - Summer (DST): UTC+2 (CEST)
- Postal code: 8778
- Area code: (+36) 93
- Website: www.ujudvar.hu

Újudvar is a village in Zala County, Hungary.

== Location ==
Újudvar is located a few kilometers north of the exit from the main road 74 at Nagykanizsa, along road 7527 in the valley of the Principalis-canal. Road 7528, which branches off from the latter road, leads to the main road 74 through Magyarszerdahely.

It can also be reached by train on the Szombathely – Nagykanizsa railway line ; Újudvar railway station is almost 2 km from the settlement, not far from the Korpavár part of Nagykanizsa (on the same line the stop at Magyarszerdahely is a little closer, about 1.5 km).

== History ==
The settlement was first mentioned in 1193 as Ojvduor in Béla III of Hungary's charter, when recording the estates of the Crusaders of Fehérvár. Presumably Euphrosyne of Kiev, Géza II of Hungary's wife donated it to the church of Cathedral Basilica of Székesfehérvár. In 1256 its name appeared as Nova Curia, and in 1377 the village was named Wyoduar.

According to a charter dated 1236, Johannite knights arrived in the village, where a convent was soon established. In 1325 a palatine assembly was also held in the village, the church of which was later consecrated in honor of St. John the Baptist; It was mentioned in 1350. The settlement was also a marketplace, in 1329 a fair was mentioned in a charter, until 1381 it also served as a place of authenticity.

In 1382, Újudvar was pawned to the sons of János Kanizsai by the Johannites, and later remained their property, although in 1453 the slash of Vrána began a lawsuit against them, his successor continued it under King Matthias, but to no avail.

Although the Kanizsai bloodline ended with Francis Kanizsai in 1532, the estates were inherited by the Nádasdy family through Orsolya Kanizsai becoming a male in the eye of the law.

In a 1693 census, the village was listed as a former Nádasdy estate, but by 1693 it became the property of the treasury. At that time the number of inhabited houses was 10, to which 60 acres of arable land and meadow belonged.

The village was destroyed during the Ottoman occupation, and rebuilt to the east during the post-destruction reconstruction.

It was a serf village since its founding. Most of its population was engaged in agriculture. Until 1945, it had several smallholders.

== List of mayors ==
=== Mayors ===
- 1990-1994: Gregor Tiborné (independent)
- 1994-1998: Gregor Tiborné (independent)
- 1998-2002: Mrs. Gregor Tiborné (independent)
- 2002-2006: Mrs. Gregor Tiborné (independent)
- 2006-2010: Sándor Jakab (independent)
- 2010–2014: Józsefné Horváth (independent)
- 2014–2019: Jakab Sándor (independent)
- From 2019: Jakab Sándor (independent)
