= Rigyác =

Rigyác Redžac / Ridžac (in Croatian)
- Village
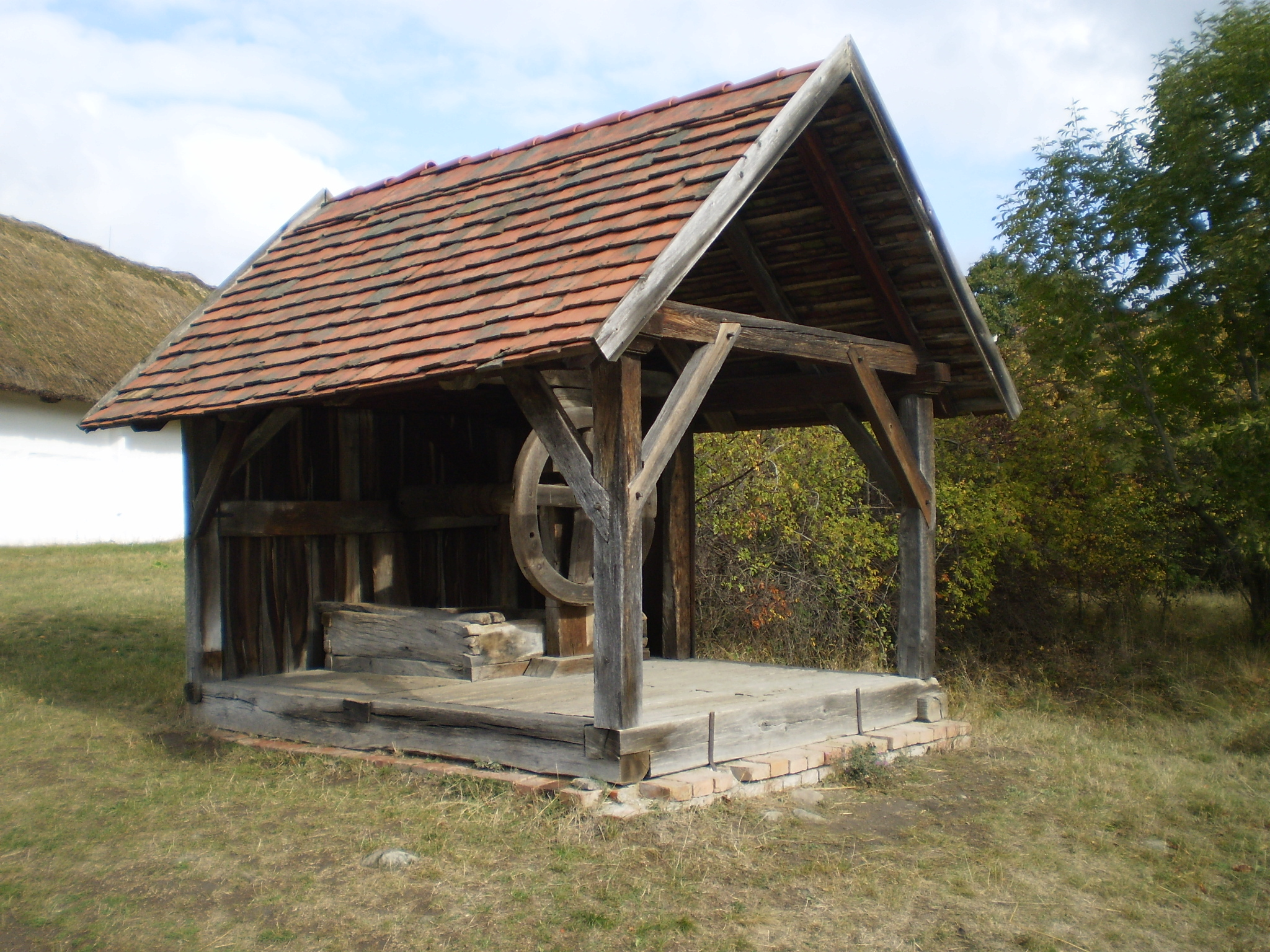

- Flag Coat of arms

- Location of Rigyác
- Coordinates: 46.46562°N 16.86373°E
- Country: Hungary
- Region: Western Transdanubia
- County: Zala
- District: Nagykanizsa

Area
  - Total: 15.36 km^{2} (5.93 sq mi)

Population (1 January 2025)
  - Total: 372
  - Density: 24.2/km^{2} (62.7/sq mi)
- Time zone: UTC+1 (CET)
  - Summer (DST): UTC+2 (CEST)
- Postal code: 8883
- Area code: (+36) 93
- Motorways: M7
- Distance from Budapest: 221 km (137 mi) Northeast
- Website: rigyac.hu

Rigyác is a village in Zala County, Hungary.
