= Surd =

Surd may refer to:

== Mathematics ==
- Surd (mathematics), an unresolved root or sum of roots
- Radical symbol, the notation for a root
- formerly, an irrational number in general

== Other uses ==
- Surd, Hungary
- Voiceless consonant, opposed to sonant
- Jeremiah Surd, a character on the television series The Real Adventures of Jonny Quest
