= Alsórajk =

- Village
- Flag Coat of arms

- Location of Alsórajk
- Coordinates: 46°39′N 17°00′E
- Country: Hungary
- Region: Western Transdanubia
- County: Zala
- District: Nagykanizsa

Area
  - Total: 8.45 km^{2} (3.26 sq mi)

Population (1 January 2025)
  - Total: 318
  - Density: 37.6/km^{2} (97.5/sq mi)
- Time zone: UTC+1 (CET)
  - Summer (DST): UTC+2 (CEST)
- Postal code: 8767
- Area code: (+36) 93

Alsórajk is a village in Zala County, Hungary.
