= Kerecseny =

Village in Zala County, Hungary

- Village
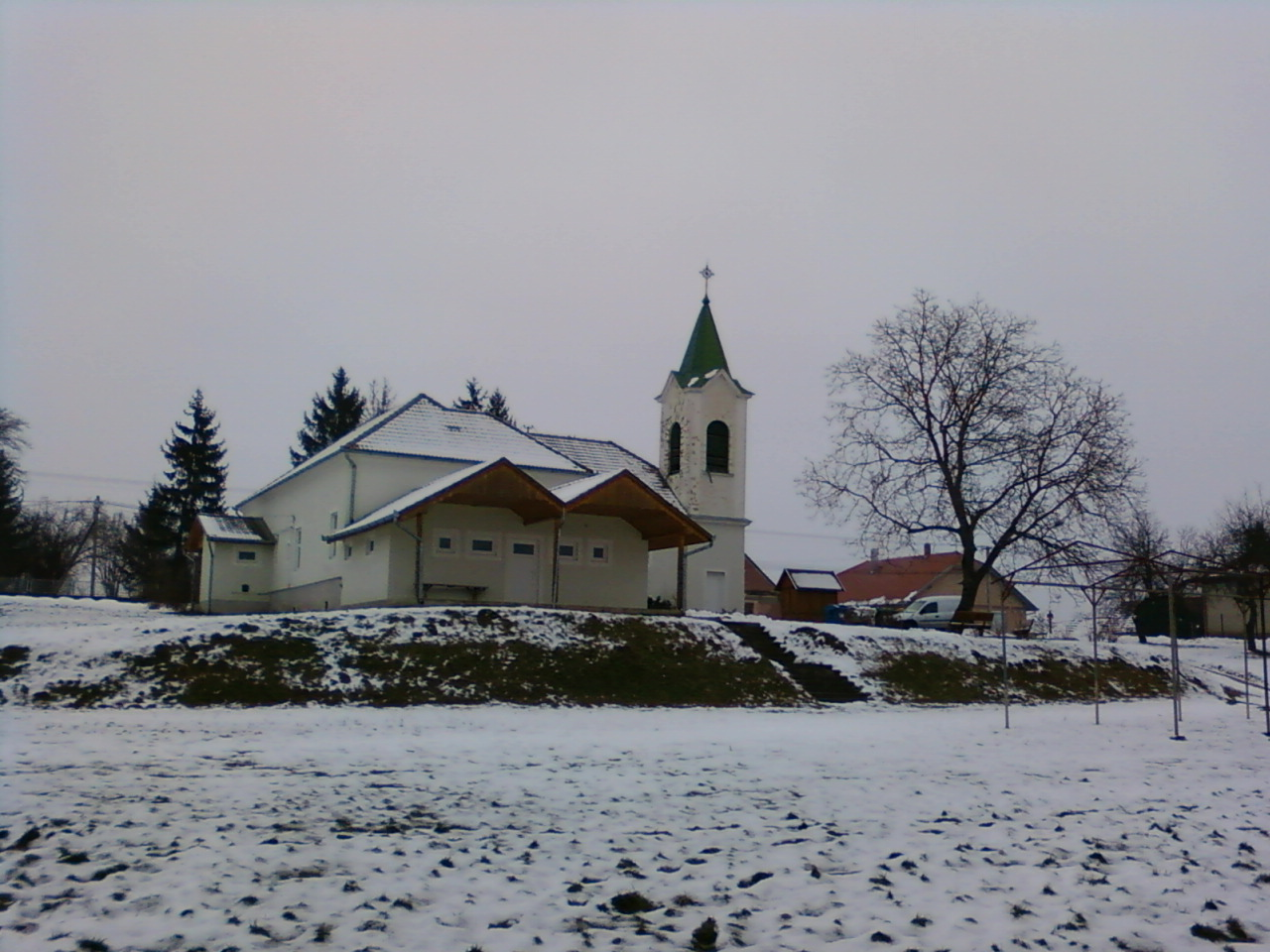

- Flag Coat of arms

- Location of Kerecseny
- Coordinates: 46.62302°N 17.04452°E
- Country: Hungary
- Region: Western Transdanubia
- County: Zala
- District: Nagykanizsa

Area
  - Total: 12.83 km^{2} (4.95 sq mi)

Population (1 January 2026)
  - Total: 246
  - Density: 19.2/km^{2} (49.7/sq mi)
- Time zone: UTC+1 (CET)
  - Summer (DST): UTC+2 (CEST)
- Postal code: 8745
- Area code: (+36) 93
- Website: kerecseny.hu

Kerecseny is a village in Zala County, Hungary.
