= Homokkomárom =

- Village
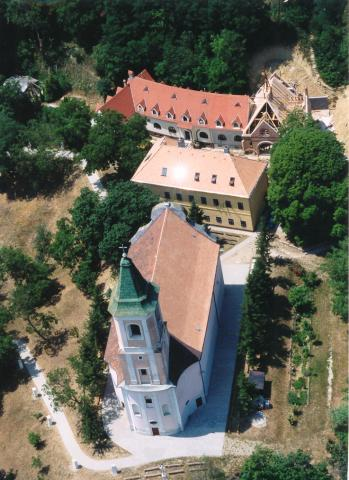

- Flag Coat of arms

- Location of Homokkomárom
- Coordinates: 46.50732°N 16.91605°E
- Country: Hungary
- Region: Western Transdanubia
- County: Zala
- District: Nagykanizsa

Area
  - Total: 16.7 km^{2} (6.4 sq mi)

Population (1 January 2025)
  - Total: 266
  - Density: 15.9/km^{2} (41.3/sq mi)
- Time zone: UTC+1 (CET)
  - Summer (DST): UTC+2 (CEST)
- Postal code: 8777
- Area code: (+36) 93
- Website: homokkomarom.hu

Homokkomárom is a village in Zala County, Hungary.
