= Ordacsehi =

Ordacsehi Čeja (in Croatian)
- Village
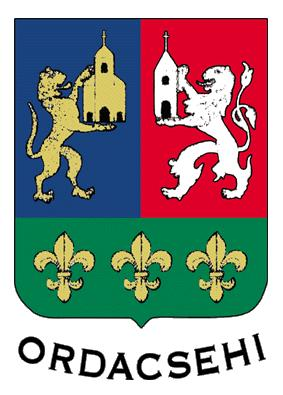
- Coat of arms

- Location of Somogy county in Hungary

- Location of Ordacsehi
- Coordinates: 46.74181°N 17.62332°E
- Country: Hungary
- Region: Southern Transdanubia
- County: Somogy
- District: Fonyód
- RC Diocese: Kaposvár

Area
  - Total: 22.56 km^{2} (8.71 sq mi)

Population (2017)
  - Total: 761
  - Density: 33.7/km^{2} (87.4/sq mi)
- Demonym: ordacsehi
- Time zone: UTC+1 (CET)
  - Summer (DST): UTC+2 (CEST)
- Postal code: 8635
- Area code: (+36) 85
- Patron Saint: Wendelin of Trier
- Motorways: M7
- Distance from Budapest: 147 km (91 mi) Northeast
- NUTS 3 code: HU232
- MP: József Attila Móring (KDNP)
- Website: Ordacsehi Online

Ordacsehi (Croatian: Čeja) is a village in Somogy county, Hungary.

The settlement is part of the Balatonboglár wine region.

== History ==
According to László Szita the settlement was completely Hungarian in the 18th century.
