= Sand, Hungary =

Sand
- Village
- Flag Coat of arms

- Location of Sand
- Coordinates: 46.42266°N 17.12528°E
- Country: Hungary
- Region: Western Transdanubia
- County: Zala
- District: Nagykanizsa

Area
  - Total: 7.48 km^{2} (2.89 sq mi)

Population (1 January 2025)
  - Total: 345
  - Density: 46.1/km^{2} (119/sq mi)
- Time zone: UTC+1 (CET)
  - Summer (DST): UTC+2 (CEST)
- Postal code: 8824
- Area code: (+36) 93

Sand is a village in Zala County, Hungary. It is a very small agricultural town, located on gently rolling hills. There is an Evangelical church and a Catholic church near the center of town, and there are memorials to those who served in both world wars nearby. Sand is close to the towns of Csurgó, Iharosberény, and Liszó, and the largest town nearby is Nagykanizsa.
