= Kilimán =

- Village
- Flag Coat of arms

- Location of Kilimán
- Coordinates: 46.6378°N 16.9954°E
- Country: Hungary
- Region: Western Transdanubia
- County: Zala
- District: Nagykanizsa

Area
  - Total: 5.72 km^{2} (2.21 sq mi)

Population (1 January 2026)
  - Total: 203
  - Density: 35.5/km^{2} (91.9/sq mi)
- Time zone: UTC+1 (CET)
  - Summer (DST): UTC+2 (CEST)
- Postal code: 8774
- Area code: (+36) 93
- Website: kiliman.hu

Kilimán is a village in Zala County, Hungary.
