= Nagyrécse =

Nagyrécse Recea Mare
- Village
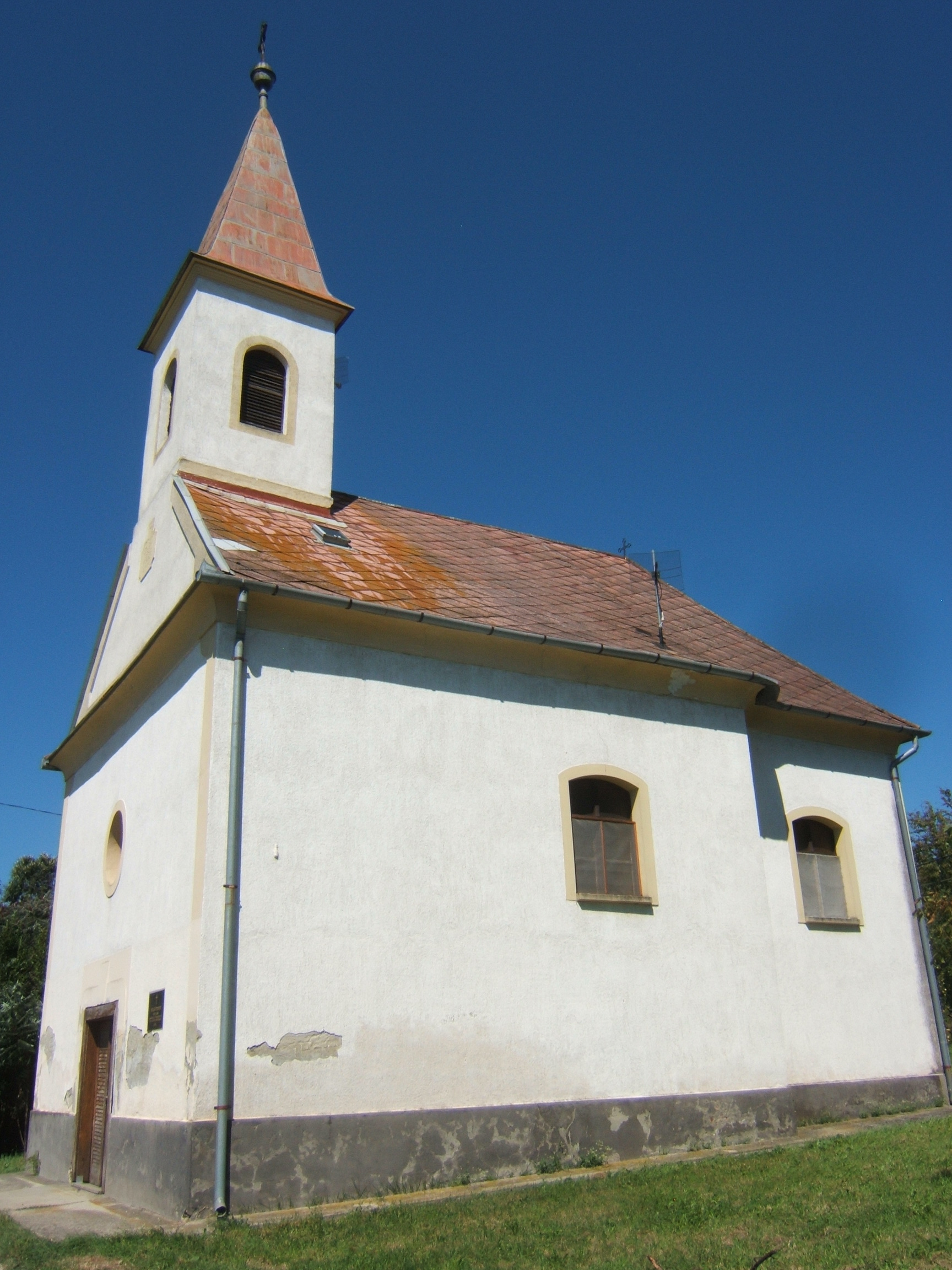

- Flag Coat of arms

- Location of Nagyrécse
- Coordinates: 46.48948°N 17.05263°E
- Country: Hungary
- Region: Western Transdanubia
- County: Zala
- District: Nagykanizsa

Area
  - Total: 26.99 km^{2} (10.42 sq mi)

Population (1 January 2025)
  - Total: 1,105
  - Density: 40.94/km^{2} (106.0/sq mi)
- Time zone: UTC+1 (CET)
  - Summer (DST): UTC+2 (CEST)
- Postal code: 8756
- Area code: (+36) 93
- Website: nagyrecse.hu

Nagyrécse is a village in Zala County, Hungary.
