= Fityeház =

Fityeház Fićehaz
- Village
- Flag Coat of arms

- Location of Fityeház
- Coordinates: 46.37527°N 16.90566°E
- Country: Hungary
- Region: Western Transdanubia
- County: Zala
- District: Nagykanizsa

Area
  - Total: 6.5 km^{2} (2.5 sq mi)

Population (1 January 2025)
  - Total: 561
  - Density: 86/km^{2} (220/sq mi)
- Time zone: UTC+1 (CET)
  - Summer (DST): UTC+2 (CEST)
- Postal code: 8835
- Area code: (+36) 93
- Website: fityehaz.hu

Fityeház (Croatian: Fićehaz) is a village in Zala County, Hungary.
