= Balatonmagyaród =

- Village
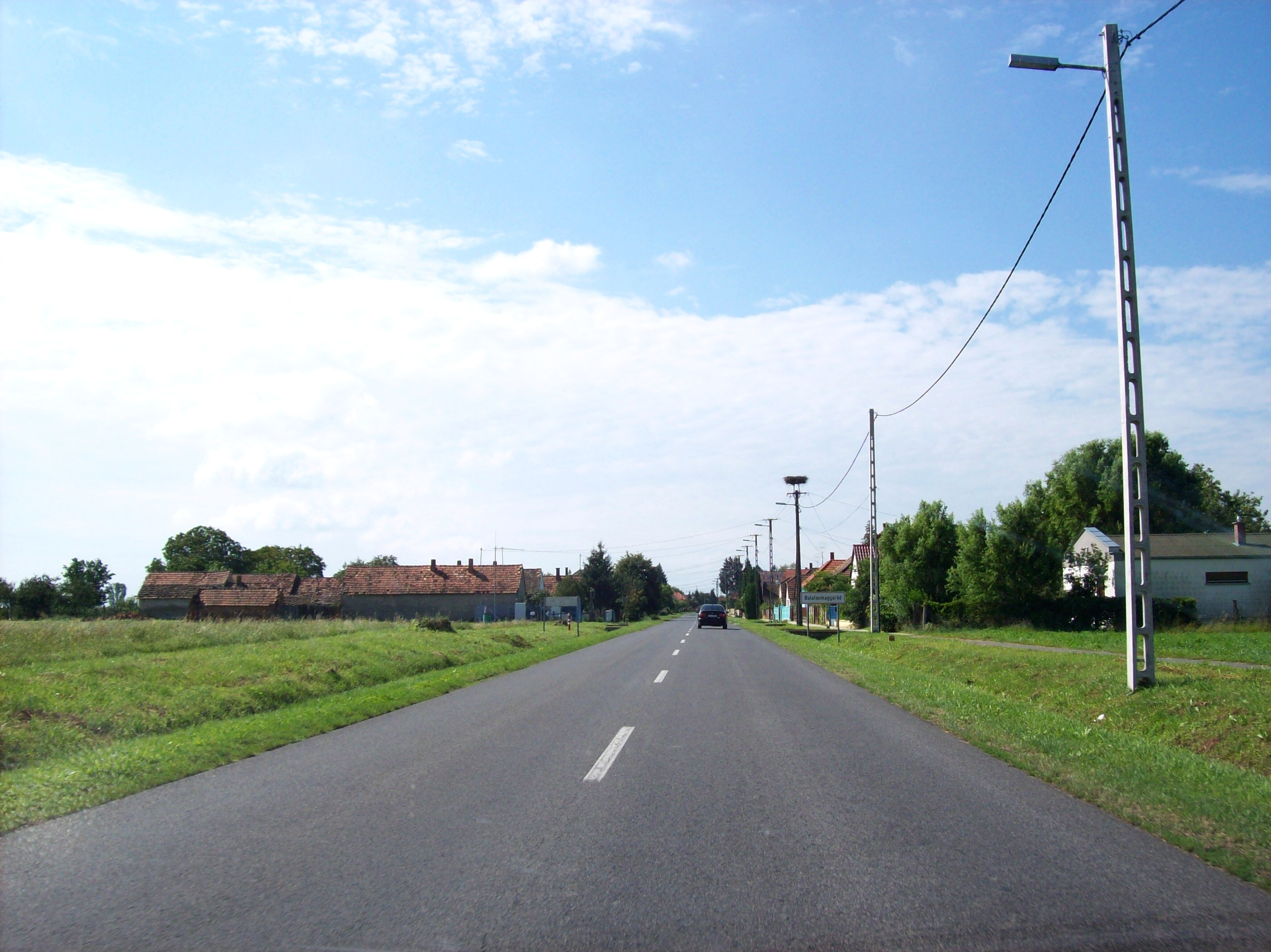

- Flag Coat of arms

- Location of Balatonmagyaród
- Coordinates: 46°36′N 17°11′E
- Country: Hungary
- Region: Western Transdanubia
- County: Zala
- District: Nagykanizsa

Area
  - Total: 31.53 km^{2} (12.17 sq mi)

Population (1 January 2025)
  - Total: 398
  - Density: 12.6/km^{2} (32.7/sq mi)
- Time zone: UTC+1 (CET)
  - Summer (DST): UTC+2 (CEST)
- Postal code: 8753
- Area code: (+36) 93
- Website: balatonmagyarod.hu

Balatonmagyaród is a village in Zala County, Hungary.
