= Pat, Hungary =

Pat
- Flag Coat of arms

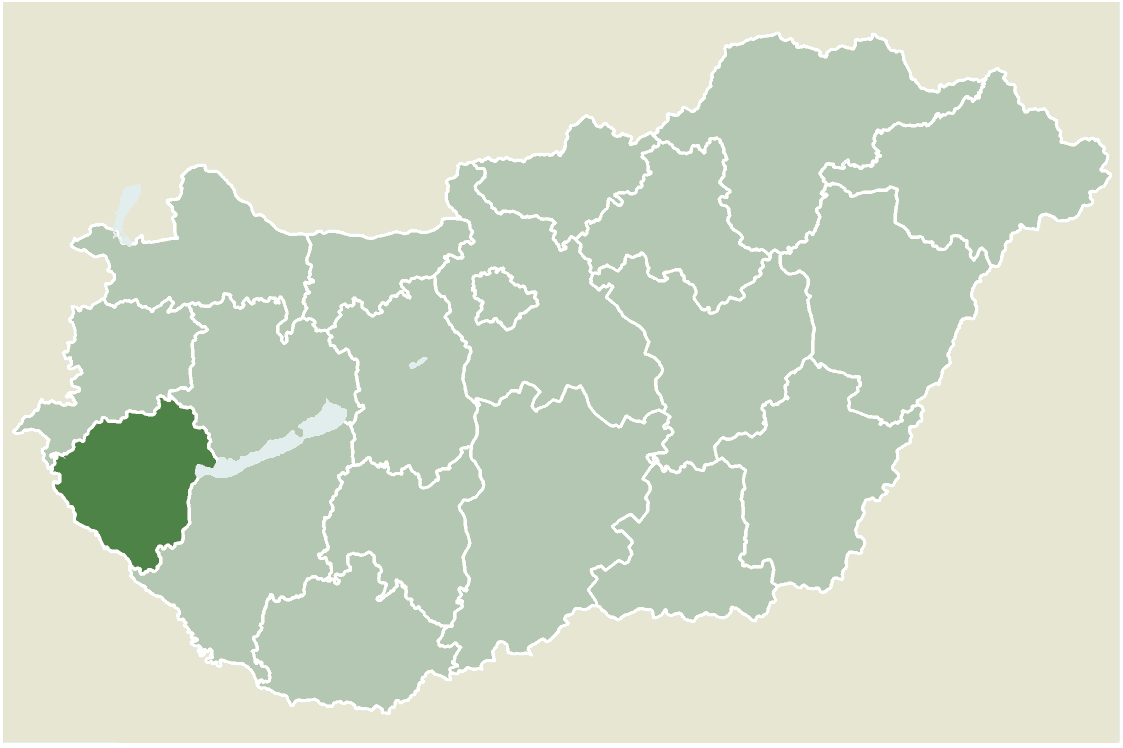
- Location of Zala county in Hungary

- Location of Pat, Hungary
- Coordinates: 46.44086°N 17.18345°E
- Country: Hungary
- County: Zala County

Area
  - Total: 8.33 km^{2} (3.22 sq mi)

Population (2015)
  - Total: 182
  - Density: 22.69/km^{2} (58.8/sq mi)
- Time zone: UTC+1 (CET)
  - Summer (DST): UTC+2 (CEST)
- Postal code: 8825
- Area code: 93

Pat is a village located in Zala County, Hungary, 25 kilometres from Nagykanizsa.

The neighbouring villages are Miháld and Varászló, which is now part of Somogy County. The county border is only 300 metres from the centre of Pat.

== Population ==
The nationality breakdown at the time of the 2011 census was as follows:

Hungarian 97,5%, German 2,5%.

63.6% of the inhabitants declared themselves Roman Catholic, 5.8% Reformed, 18.9% Evangelical (10.2% did not declare).
