= Balatonvilágos =

- Village
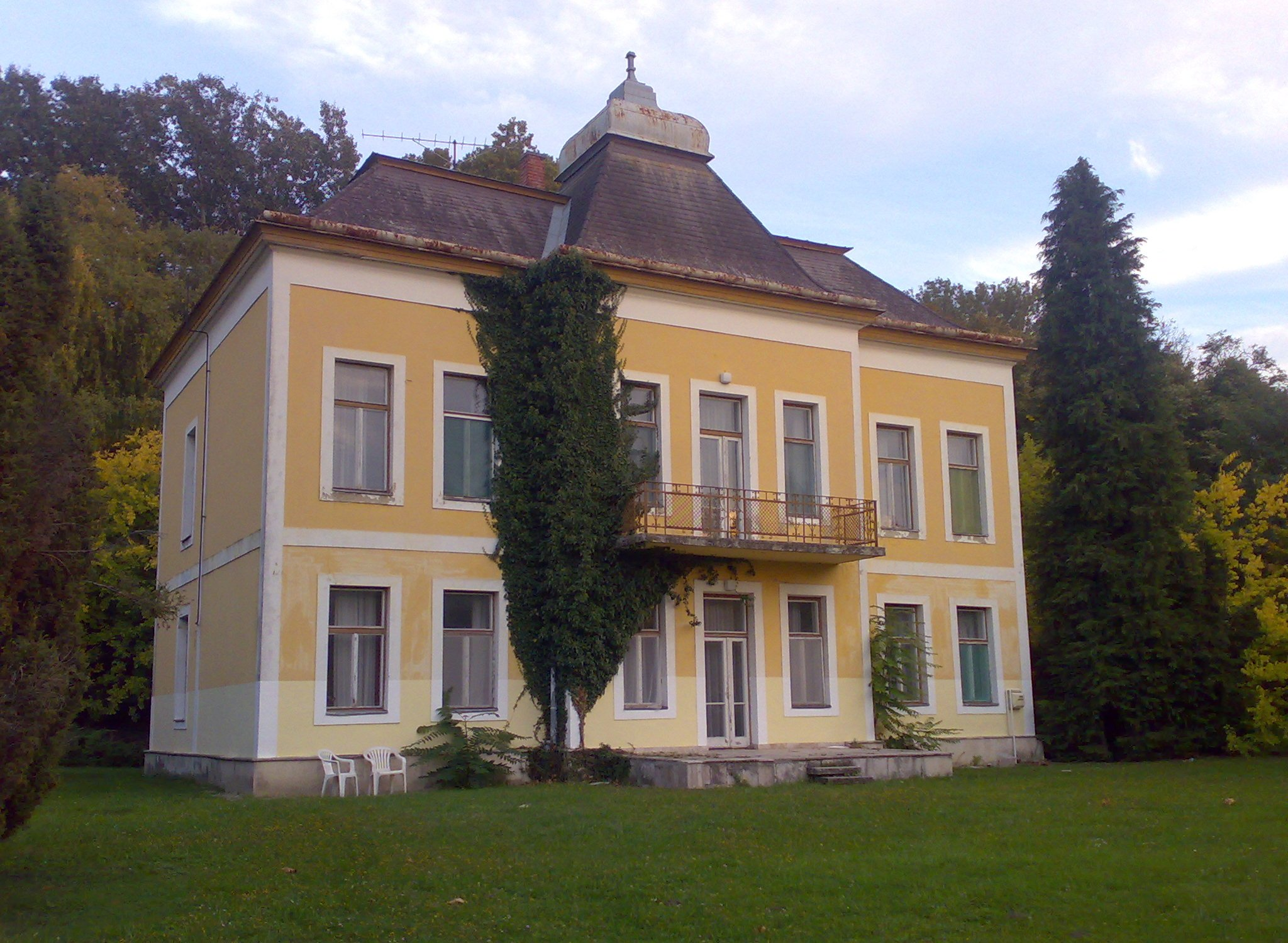
- Former holiday resort of MSZMP

- Flag Coat of arms

- Location of Somogy county in Hungary

- Location of Balatonvilágos
- Coordinates: 46.97439°N 18.16528°E
- Country: Hungary
- Region: Southern Transdanubia
- County: Somogy
- District: Siófok

Area
  - Total: 29.21 km^{2} (11.28 sq mi)

Population (2017)
  - Total: 1,161
  - Density: 39.75/km^{2} (102.9/sq mi)
- Demonym(s): világosi, balatonvilágosi
- Time zone: UTC+1 (CET)
  - Summer (DST): UTC+2 (CEST)
- Postal code: 8171
- Area code: 88
- Motorways: M7
- Distance from Budapest: 92.6 km (57.5 mi) Northeast
- NUTS 3 code: HU232
- MP: Mihály Witzmann (Fidesz)

Balatonvilágos is the northernmost as well as the easternmost village of Somogy county, Hungary.
