= Zalaújlak =

- Village
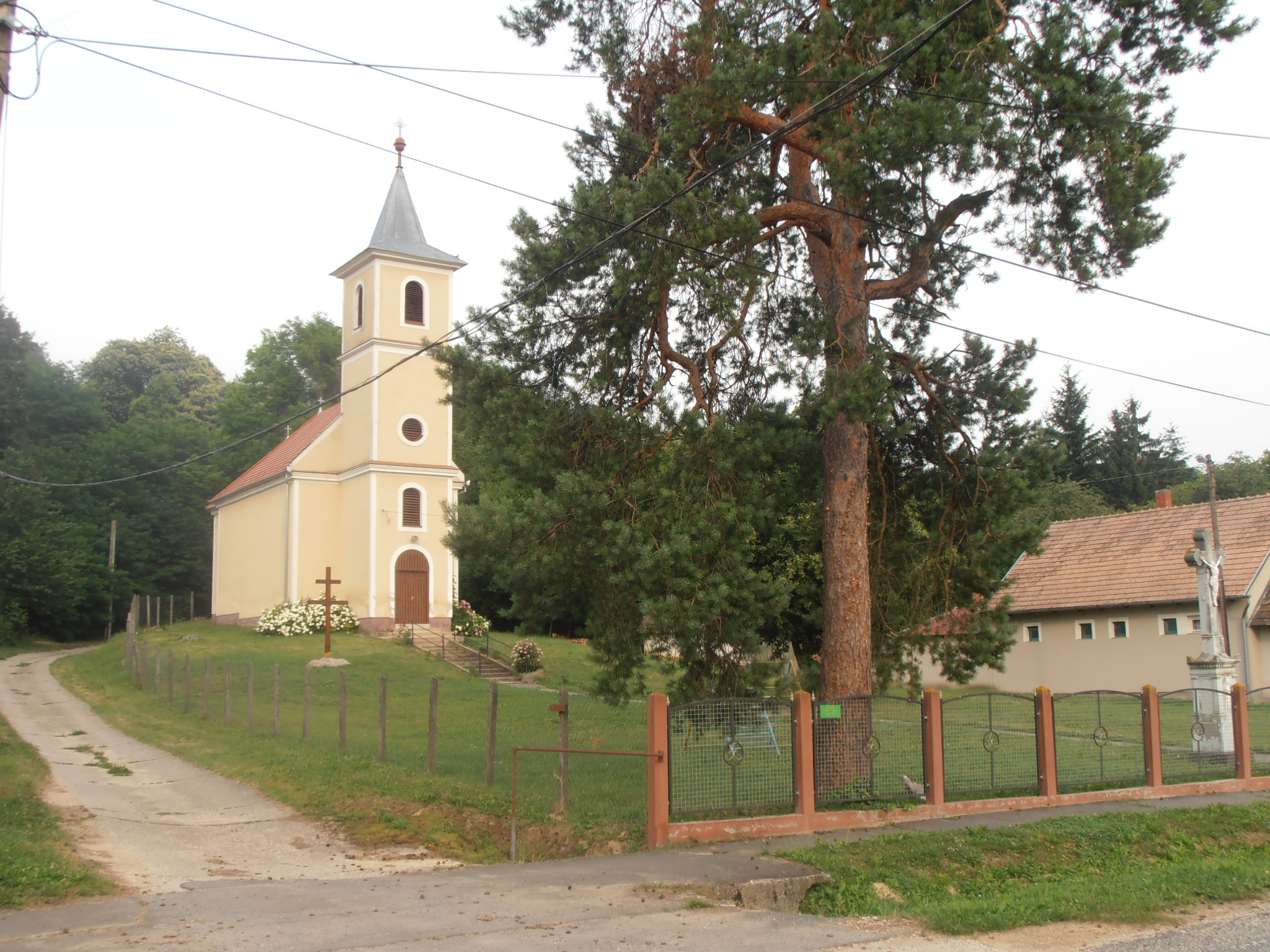

- Flag Coat of arms

- Location of Zalaújlak
- Coordinates: 46.558381°N 17.079189°E
- Country: Hungary
- Region: Western Transdanubia
- County: Zala
- District: Nagykanizsa

Area
  - Total: 9.64 km^{2} (3.72 sq mi)

Population (1 January 2026)
  - Total: 109
  - Density: 11.3/km^{2} (29.3/sq mi)
- Time zone: UTC+1 (CET)
  - Summer (DST): UTC+2 (CEST)
- Postal code: 8822
- Area code: (+36) 93
- Website: www.zalaujlak.hu

Zalaújlak is a village in Zala County, Hungary.
