= Nagybakónak =

- Village
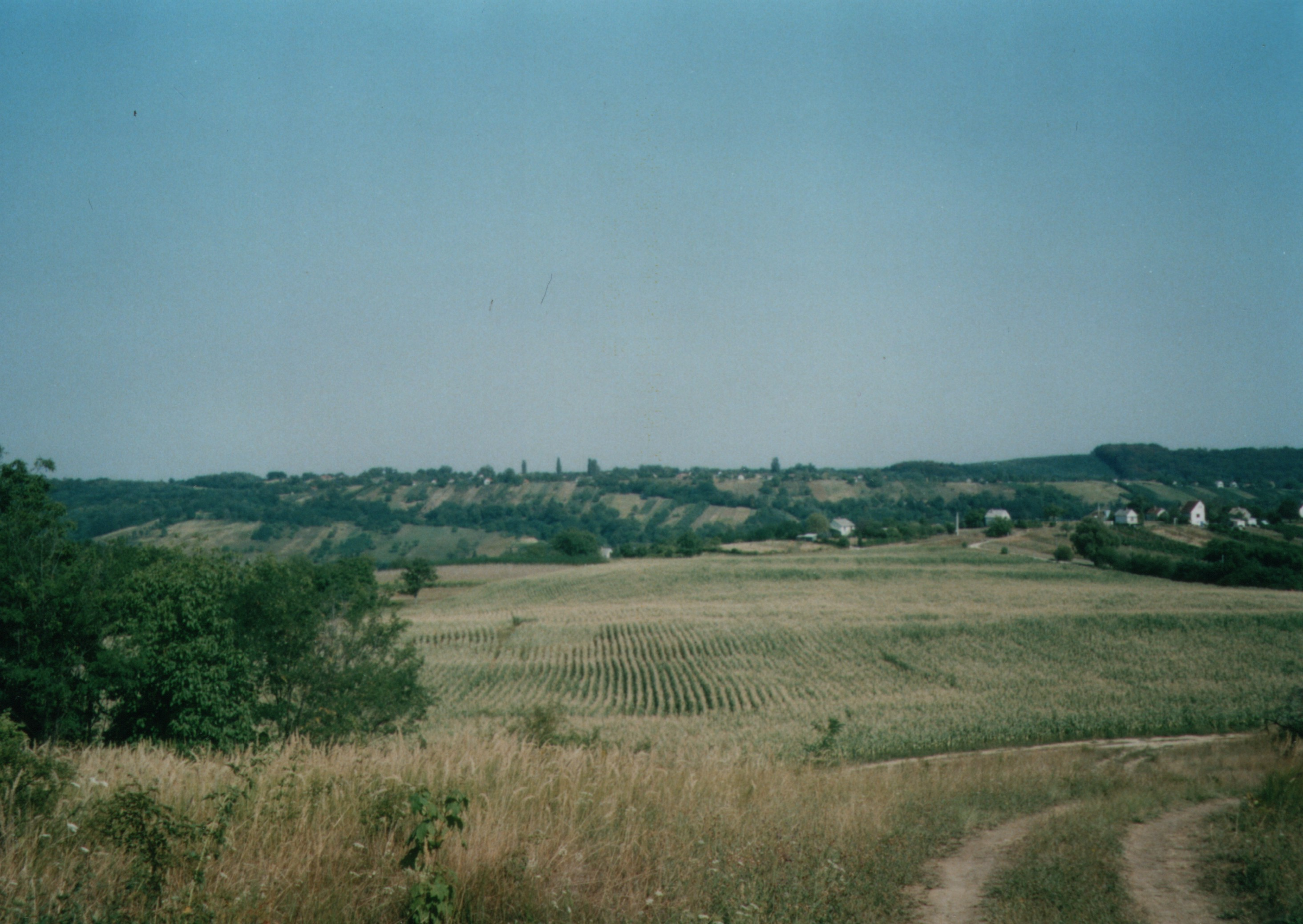

- Flag Coat of arms

- Location of Nagybakónak
- Coordinates: 46.5533°N 17.04318°E
- Country: Hungary
- Region: Western Transdanubia
- County: Zala
- District: Nagykanizsa

Area
  - Total: 17.94 km^{2} (6.93 sq mi)

Population (1 January 2025)
  - Total: 373
  - Density: 20.8/km^{2} (53.8/sq mi)
- Time zone: UTC+1 (CET)
  - Summer (DST): UTC+2 (CEST)
- Postal code: 8821
- Area code: (+36) 93
- Website: nagybakonak.hu

Nagybakónak is a village in Zala County, Hungary. It is located in the far west of the country, between the western end of Lake Balaton and the border with Croatia. The village is 15 kilometres to the north of the city of Nagykanizsa, and eight kilometres west of the spa town of Zalakaros.
