= Zalamerenye =

- Village
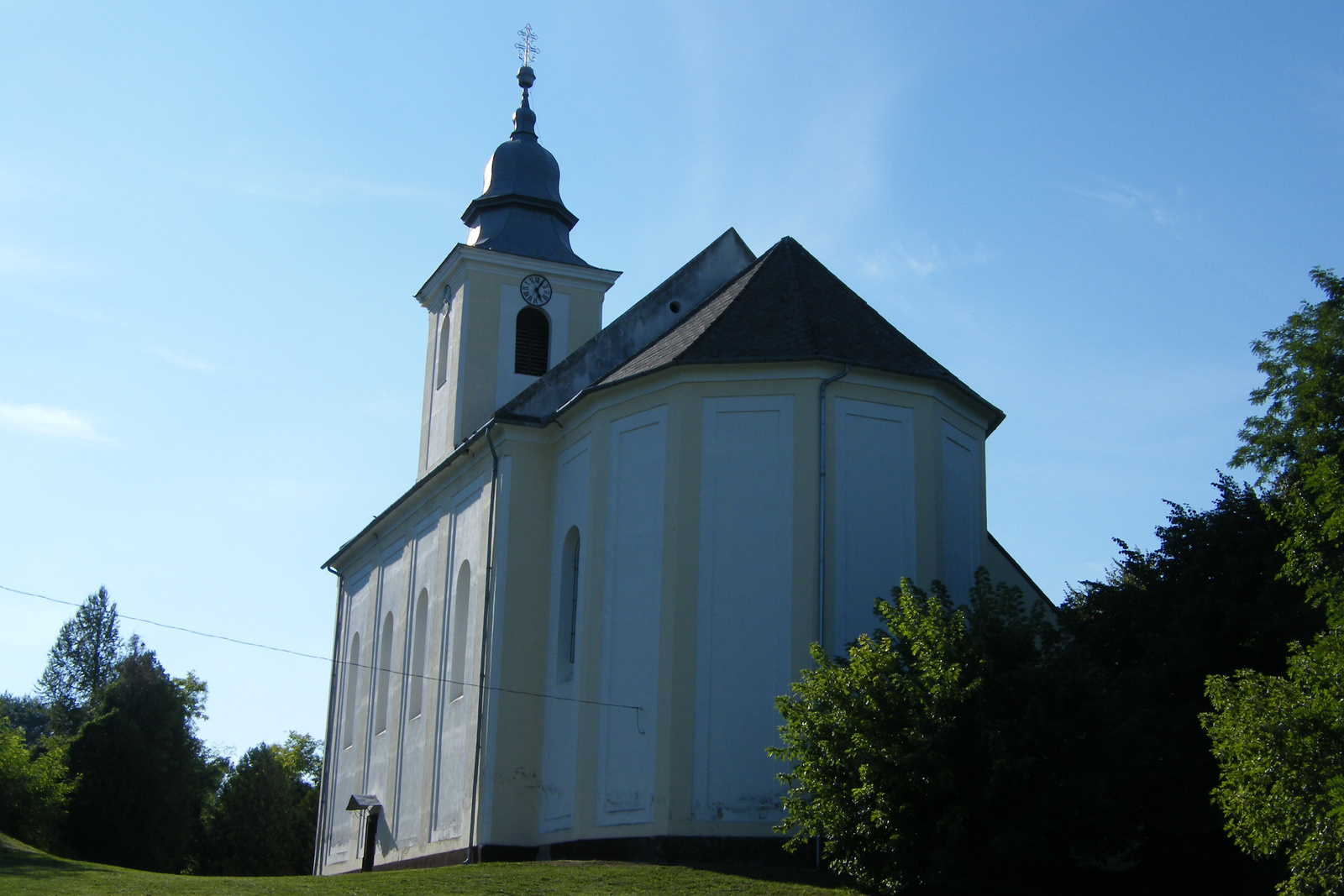

- Flag Coat of arms

- Location of Zalamerenye
- Coordinates: 46.57552°N 17.09635°E
- Country: Hungary
- Region: Western Transdanubia
- County: Zala
- District: Nagykanizsa

Area
  - Total: 13.99 km^{2} (5.40 sq mi)

Population (1 January 2026)
  - Total: 196
  - Density: 14.0/km^{2} (36.3/sq mi)
- Time zone: UTC+1 (CET)
  - Summer (DST): UTC+2 (CEST)
- Postal code: 8747
- Area code: (+36) 93
- Website: www.zalamerenye.hu

Zalamerenye is a village in Zala County, Hungary.
