= Zrinski Bridge =

Zrinski Bridge / Zrinyi Bridge
- Coordinates: 46.41215°N 16.701021°E
- Carries: road vehicles
- Crosses: Mura River
- Locale: Northern Croatia, southwest Hungary
- Official name: Zrinski most / Zrínyi híd
- Maintained by: Hrvatske autoceste Állami Autópálya Kezelő Zrt.

Characteristics
- Design: Box girder bridge
- Total length: 216 m (709 ft)
- Width: 2 × 15 m (49 ft)
- Longest span: 48 m (157 ft)

History
- Opened: 2008

Statistics
- Toll: not tolled

The Zrinski Bridge or Zrínyi Bridge (Croatian: Zrinski most, Hungarian: Zrínyi híd) connects the Croatian A4 and the Hungarian M7 motorways, spanning the Mura River. As it also spans Hungarian–Croatian border, a joint border checkpoint is located north of the bridge. The bridge is located between Goričan interchange of the A4 motorway and the M70 motorway interchange of the M7. The bridge is a part of a major north–south transportation corridor in Croatia and Hungary and a part of European routes E65 and E71 as well as the Pan-European corridor Vb.

The bridge is a composite continuous girder structure executed across five spans, 216 meters (709 feet) long overall. It consists of two 15-meter (49 ft) parallel structures, each carrying one carriageway, set 80 centimeters (31 inches) apart. Construction and naming of the bridge was announced in 2007 by Croatian and Hungarian governments following a joint session, and ceremonially opened on 22 October 2008 as the last piece of the motorway route connecting the Hungarian capital, Budapest, to the Croatian capital, Zagreb, and the Port of Rijeka after 40 years of construction.

The bridge was designed by Uvaterv and built by Hidroelektra-Niskogradnja at a cost of 8 million kuna (1.08 million euro). The cost was shared equally by Croatia and Hungary. The bridge is maintained by Hrvatske autoceste and Állami Autópálya Kezelő Zrt.

== Description ==
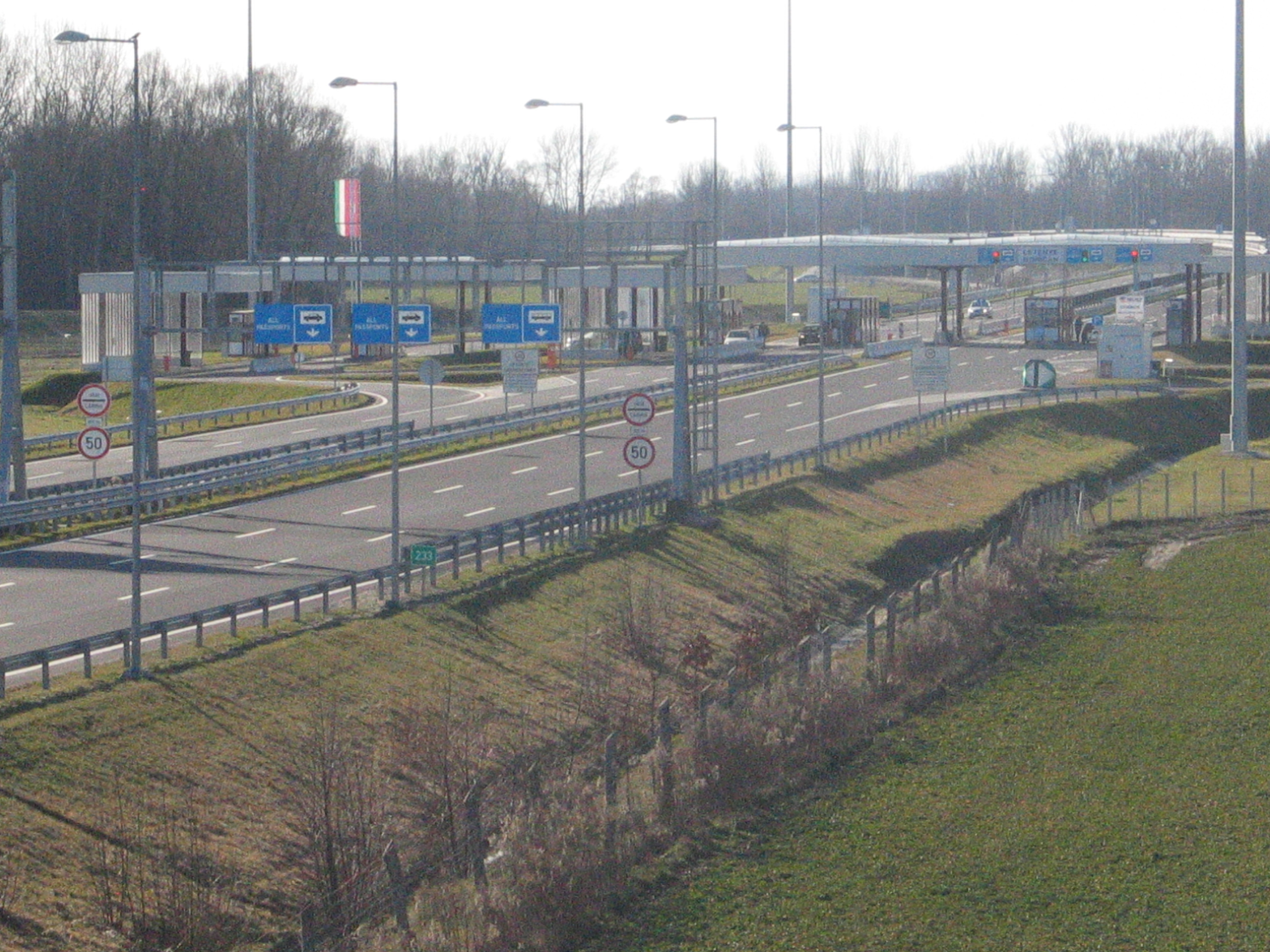
Goričan/Letenye border crossing adjacent to the Zrinski Bridge

The Zrinski Bridge/Zrínyi Bridge connects the Croatian A4 and the Hungarian M7 motorways, spanning the river Mura. As it also spans Hungarian–Croatian border, a border checkpoint is situated adjacent to the bridge, on the north bank. The bridge is located between Goričan interchange of the A4 motorway and the M70 motorway interchange of the M7. The bridge is a part of a major north–south transportation corridor in Croatia and Hungary and a part of European routes E65 and E71 as well as the Pan-European corridor Vb.

=== Structure ===
The A4/M7 motorway route follows a 2,000-meter (6,600 ft) radius horizontal curve and a 18,000-meter (59,000 ft) radius vertical convex curve at the site of the bridge, intersecting the watercourse at an angle of 75 degrees. The bridge consists of dual structures, one for each of the motorway carriageways, executed as composite, continuous structures. Each of the structures comprises two 2.1-meter (6 ft 11 in) × 2.0-meter (6 ft 7 in) box steel girders made composite with deck slab of variable depth (23 centimeters (9.1 inches) at mid-span), concreted in situ. Since the river is up to 200 meters (660 feet) wide and only 3 to 4 meters (9.8 to 13.1 feet) deep on average, a five span structure was selected for construction of the bridge: 36 meters (118 feet) + 3 × 48 meters (157 feet) + 36 meters (118 feet). The bridge is 216 meters (709 feet) overall and each of the two parallel structures is 15 meters (49 feet) wide, spaced 80 centimeters (31 inches) apart.

Concrete bridge piers consist of two 4.0-meter (13.1 ft) × 2.0-meter (6 ft 7 in) columns each, executed atop driven, prefabricated concrete piles. Bridge abutments are also made of concrete and supported by the same type of piles. All the piles are 8.6 to 11.3 meters (28 to 37 feet) long and comprise diameter of 50 centimeters (20 inches). The substructure is protected against scouring using gabions placed on the river bed. The bridge is fitted with electric lighting, electronic surveillance of unauthorized access to maintenance openings, as well as frost and wind-speed control devices.

=== Traffic volume ===
Volume of traffic using the Zrinski Bridge/Zrínyi Bridge is not reported regularly by Hrvatske ceste in their annual bulletins on Croatian road traffic volume, even though it is a part of the A4 motorway where the traffic volume is normally measured. Still, such a measurement is available for the adjacent section of the A4, where average annual daily traffic volume of 2,188 vehicles was observed in 2010. Since the route comprising the bridge is used by substantial number of tourists traveling between Hungary and Adriatic Sea resorts, the traffic volume increases during July–August period—to 7,247 vehicles in 2010.

== History ==
Originally, construction of the bridge was planned by Hrvatske autoceste to start in 2006, along with a 1.4-kilometer (0.87 mi) connector to the A4 motorway completed by that time and a 1-kilometer (0.62 mi) M7 connector. Initially, the works were planned to be completed by 2007. Actual commencement of the construction works was announced in May 2007 during a joint session of the Government of Croatia and the Government of Hungary. At the same time, it was declared that the bridge shall be called Zrinski Bridge, after the House of Zrinski. The press continued to refer to the bridge under the generic name "Mura" (after the river) even after it was opened.

The prefabricated piles, manufactured by Tvornica Betonskih Stupova – TBS in Jastrebarsko, and sections of the steel structural elements, manufactured by Đuro Đaković in Slavonski Brod, were delivered to the construction site by trucks. The steel structure was assembled on the northern (Hungarian) bank of the river followed by incremental launching of the superstructure. The bridge design was developed by Hungarian company Uvaterv, and the bridge construction works were performed by Croatian Hidroelektra-Niskogradnja. Bridge equipment was installed by Dalekovod. Total cost of the bridge construction works was 8 million kuna (1.08 million euro). The cost was shared equally by Croatia and Hungary. Additional 50 million kuna (6.7 million euro) was required to build the connecting motorway section north of Goričan interchange.

The bridge was completed and opened for traffic on 22 October 2008 by Croatian and Hungarian transport ministers. Opening of the bridge signified completion of the motorway route spanning Budapest and Rijeka via Zagreb after 40 years of construction. At the occasion a joint border crossing checkpoint was opened. It was completed in October 2007, and funded by the European Union. Completion of the bridge was greeted with expectation of advances in areas of tourism, transportation safety and economic development, as the bridge represented the first modern motorway link between the countries. The bridge is maintained by Hrvatske autoceste and Állami Autópálya Kezelő Zrt, companies maintaining the motorways connecting on the bridge.

== See also ==
- Motorways in Croatia
- Motorways in Hungary
