= Csapi =

- Village
- Flag Coat of arms

- Location of Csapi
- Coordinates: 46.53120°N 17.08946°E
- Country: Hungary
- Region: Western Transdanubia
- County: Zala
- District: Nagykanizsa

Area
  - Total: 10.11 km^{2} (3.90 sq mi)

Population (1 January 2025)
  - Total: 139
  - Density: 13.7/km^{2} (35.6/sq mi)
- Time zone: UTC+1 (CET)
  - Summer (DST): UTC+2 (CEST)
- Postal code: 8756
- Area code: (+36) 93
- Website: www.csapi.hu

Csapi is a village in Zala County, Hungary.
