= Belezna =

Belezna Blezna (in Croatian)
- Village
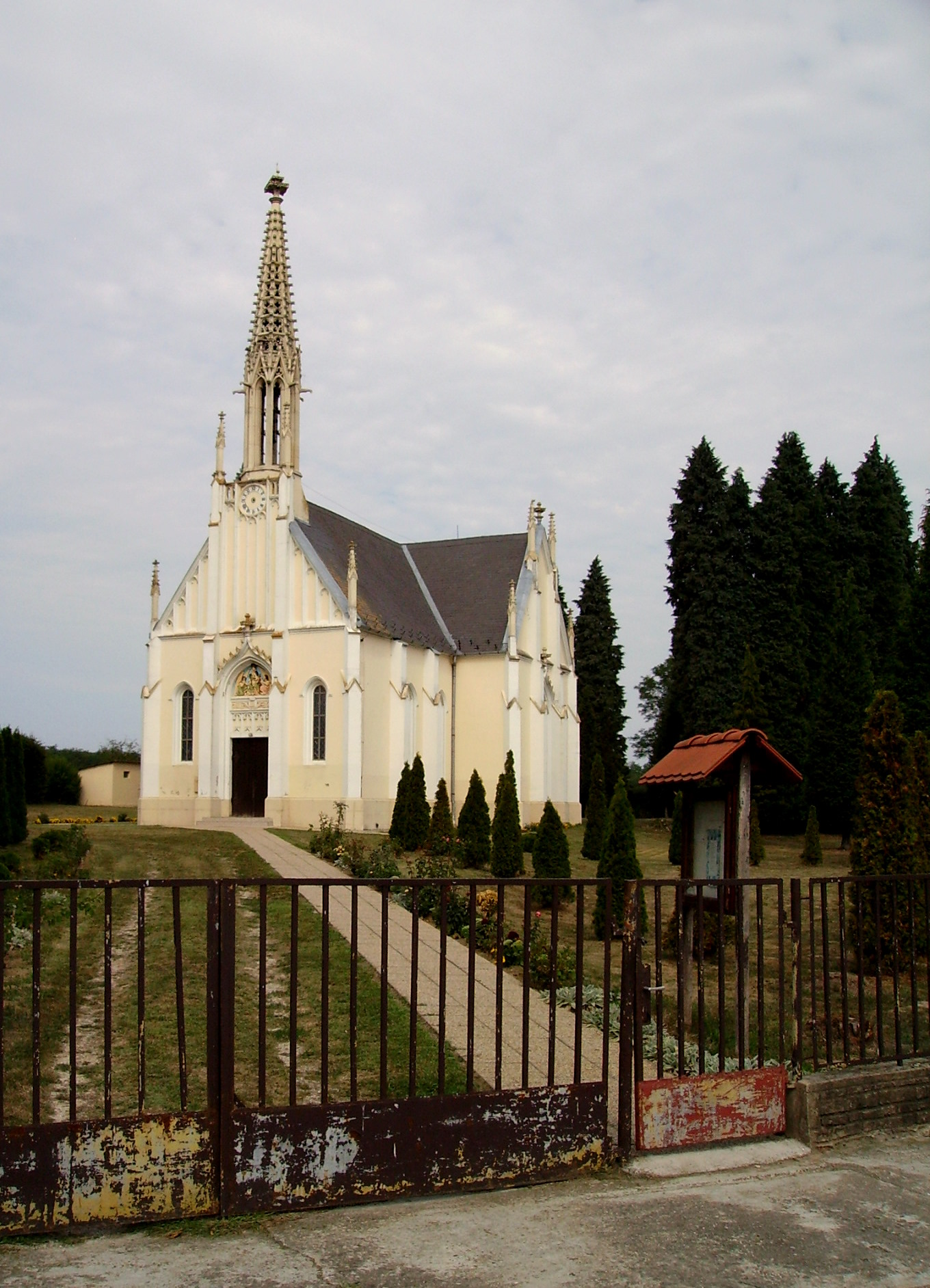

- Flag Coat of arms

- Location of Belezna
- Coordinates: 46.32816°N 16.93605°E
- Country: Hungary
- Region: Western Transdanubia
- County: Zala
- District: Nagykanizsa

Area
  - Total: 30.93 km^{2} (11.94 sq mi)

Population (1 January 2025)
  - Total: 596
  - Density: 19.3/km^{2} (49.9/sq mi)
- Time zone: UTC+1 (CET)
  - Summer (DST): UTC+2 (CEST)
- Postal code: 8855
- Area code: (+36) 93
- Website: belezna.hu

Belezna (Croatian: Blezna) is a village in Zala County, Hungary with 748 inhabitants (status: January 2012).
