= Fűzvölgy =

- Village
- Flag Coat of arms

- Location of Fűzvölgy
- Coordinates: 46.525661°N 16.940831°E
- Country: Hungary
- Region: Western Transdanubia
- County: Zala
- District: Nagykanizsa

Area
  - Total: 3.14 km^{2} (1.21 sq mi)

Population (1 January 2025)
  - Total: 134
  - Density: 42.7/km^{2} (111/sq mi)
- Time zone: UTC+1 (CET)
  - Summer (DST): UTC+2 (CEST)
- Postal code: 8777
- Area code: (+36) 93
- Website: www.fuzvolgy.hu

Fűzvölgy is a village in Zala County, Hungary.
