= Garabonc =

- Village
- Flag Coat of arms

- Location of Garabonc
- Coordinates: 46.58516°N 17.12219°E
- Country: Hungary
- Region: Western Transdanubia
- County: Zala
- District: Nagykanizsa

Area
  - Total: 18.56 km^{2} (7.17 sq mi)

Population (1 January 2025)
  - Total: 617
  - Density: 33.2/km^{2} (86.1/sq mi)
- Time zone: UTC+1 (CET)
  - Summer (DST): UTC+2 (CEST)
- Postal code: 8747
- Area code: (+36) 93
- Website: www.garabonc.hu

Garabonc is a village in Zala County, Hungary. It is about 110 miles to the west of Budapest.
