= Sormás =

Coordinates: 46°27′N 16°55′E

- Village
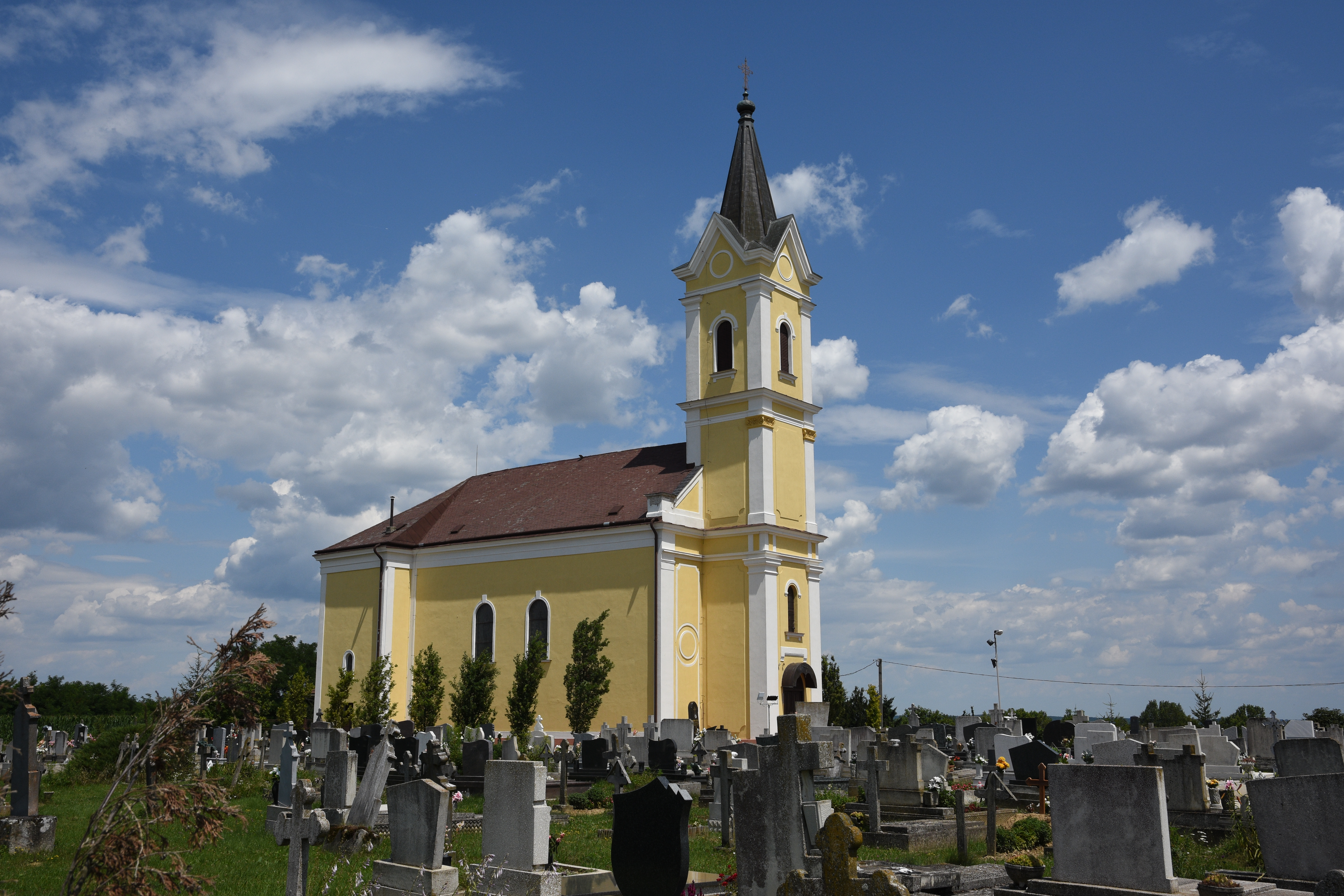
- Sormási Szent Rókus templom
- Interactive map of Sormás
- Country: Hungary
- Region: Western Transdanubia
- County: Zala County

Area
  - Land: 6.3 sq mi (16.3 km^{2})

Population
  - Total: 830
- Time zone: UTC+1 (CET)
  - Summer (DST): UTC+2 (CEST)
- Motorways: M7
- Distance from Budapest: 216 km (134 mi) Northeast

Sormás is a village in Zala County, Hungary.
