= Surd, Hungary =

Surd Šur / Šurda (in Croatian) Šurd (in Slovene)
- Village
- Flag Coat of arms

- Location of Surd
- Coordinates: 46.32112°N 16.96991°E
- Country: Hungary
- Region: Western Transdanubia
- County: Zala
- District: Nagykanizsa

Area
  - Total: 21.94 km^{2} (8.47 sq mi)

Population (1 January 2026)
  - Total: 539
  - Density: 24.6/km^{2} (63.6/sq mi)
- Time zone: UTC+1 (CET)
  - Summer (DST): UTC+2 (CEST)
- Postal code: 8856
- Area code: (+36) 93
- Website: surd.hu

Surd (Croatian: Šur, Šurda, Slovene: Šurd) is a village in Zala County, Hungary.

The village is best known for its production of Christmas trees.

== Culture ==
The Hungarian folk song Röpülj, páva, röpülj was collected in 1935 in Surd by Vilmos Seemayer.

== History ==
Surd was known since 1268, when it was presented as the estate of the Hahót family. In 1471 it was the estate of the Kanizsai family.

From 1659 it had a Lutheran pastor.

In 1848, Croatians burned the village more times.
