= Magyarszentmiklós =

- Village
- Flag Coat of arms

- Location of Magyarszentmiklós
- Coordinates: 46.5351°N 16.93868°E
- Country: Hungary
- Region: Western Transdanubia
- County: Zala
- District: Nagykanizsa

Area
  - Total: 4.19 km^{2} (1.62 sq mi)

Population (1 January 2026)
  - Total: 242
  - Density: 57.8/km^{2} (150/sq mi)
- Time zone: UTC+1 (CET)
  - Summer (DST): UTC+2 (CEST)
- Postal code: 8776
- Area code: (+36) 93
- Website: magyarszentmiklos.eu

Magyarszentmiklós is a village in Zala County, Hungary.
