= Mencshely =

- Flag Coat of arms

- Location of Veszprém county in Hungary

- Location of Mencshely
- Coordinates: 46.94651°N 17.70007°E
- Country: Hungary
- County: Veszprém

Area
  - Total: 12.62 km^{2} (4.87 sq mi)

Population (2004)
  - Total: 260
  - Density: 20.6/km^{2} (53/sq mi)
- Time zone: UTC+1 (CET)
  - Summer (DST): UTC+2 (CEST)
- Postal code: 8271
- Area code: 88

Mencshely is a village in Veszprém county, Hungary.
