= Megyer, Hungary =

Megyer
- Flag Coat of arms

- Location of Veszprém county in Hungary

- Location of Megyer
- Coordinates: 47°03′42″N 17°11′34″E
- Country: Hungary
- County: Veszprém

Area
  - Total: 4.26 km^{2} (1.64 sq mi)

Population (2013)
  - Total: 12
  - Density: 10.09/km^{2} (26.1/sq mi)
- Time zone: UTC+1 (CET)
  - Summer (DST): UTC+2 (CEST)
- Postal code: 8348
- Area code: 87

Megyer is a historical Hungarian language term which has different meanings in the Hungarian language. Most of it are connected with the names of geographical regions in Hungary.

For example, Megyer is a village in Veszprém county, Káposztásmegyer and Békásmegyer are areas of the northern part of the capital Budapest. Megyer is also the name of one of the seven tribes of Hungarians that entered the Carpathian basin, and as their tribal territories got mixed berry early, they appear in settlement names all around the country. Just like other tribe names as Kér, Keszi, Gyarmat
