= Mesterháza =

- Coat of arms

- Location of Mesterháza in Hungary
- Coordinates: 47°22′25″N 16°51′47″E
- Country: Hungary
- Region: Western Transdanubia
- County: Vas
- Subregion: Csepregi
- Rank: Village

Area
  - Total: 4.19 km^{2} (1.62 sq mi)

Population (1 January 2008)
  - Total: 166
  - Density: 39.6/km^{2} (103/sq mi)
- Time zone: UTC+1 (CET)
  - Summer (DST): UTC+2 (CEST)
- Postal code: 9662
- Area code: +36 94
- KSH code: 31875

Mesterháza is a village in Vas county, Hungary.
