= M7 motorway (Hungary) =

Road in Hungary

M7 motorway
- M7-es autópálya
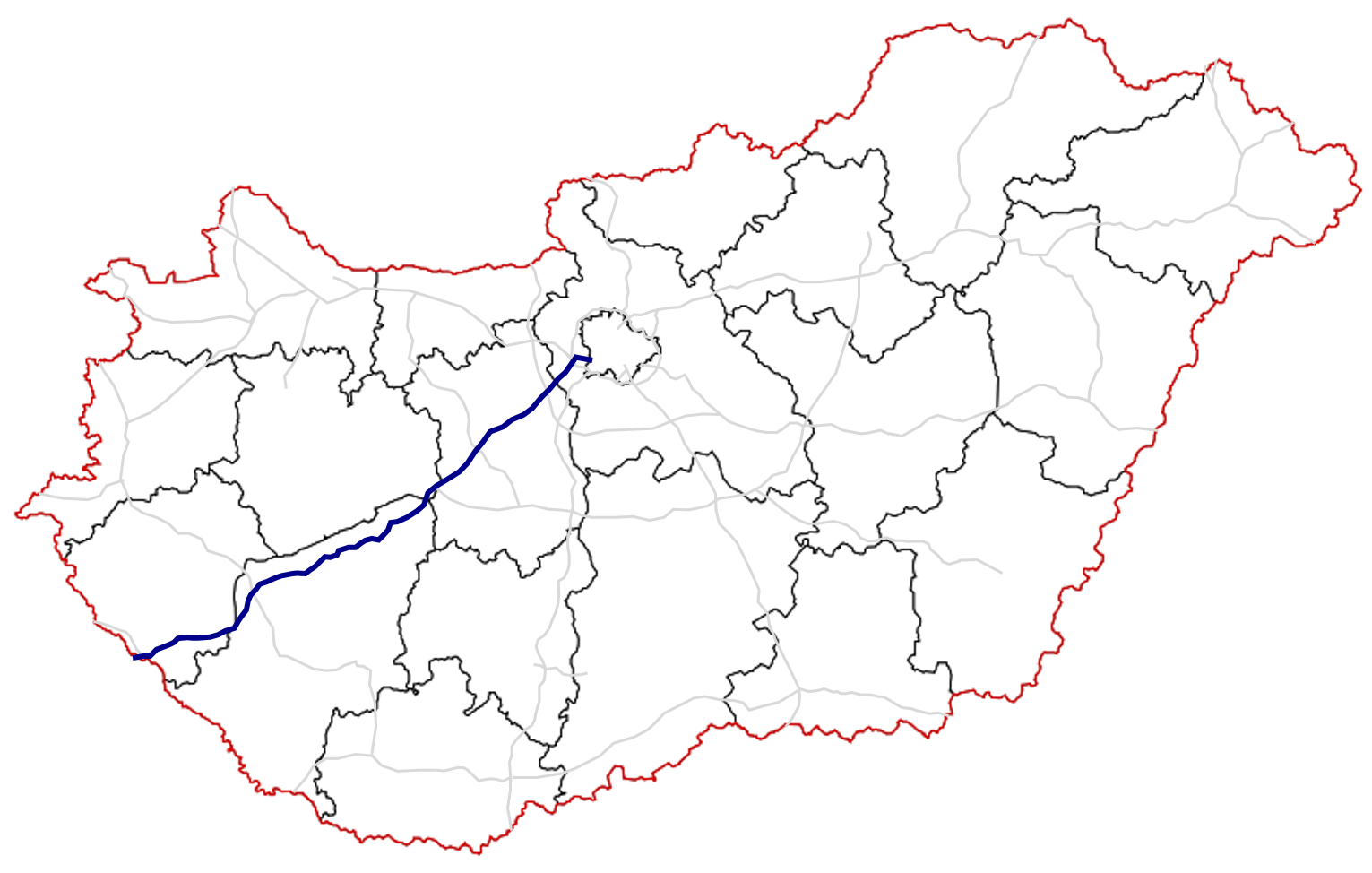
- in use other highways

Route information
- Part of E65 / E71
- Length: 233 km (145 mi)
- Existed: 1965–present
- History: Completed: 2008

Major junctions
- From: Budapest
- M1 in Budaörs; M0 in Érd; 81 in Székesfehérvár-ipari zóna; 8 / 63 in Székesfehérvár-dél; M8 near Balatonvilágos (planned); 71 in Balatonvilágos; 65 in Siófok; 67 near Balatonlelle; 68 near Balatonkeresztúr; M76 near Hollád (planned); 61 in Nagykanizsa-kelet; 74 in Nagykanizsa-Centrum; M70 near Letenye
- To: Letenye; A4 border with Croatia

Location
- Country: Hungary
- Counties: Pest, Fejér, Veszprém, Somogy, Zala
- Major cities: Budapest, Érd, Székesfehérvár, Siófok, Nagykanizsa

Highway system
- Roads in Hungary; Highways; Main roads; Local roads

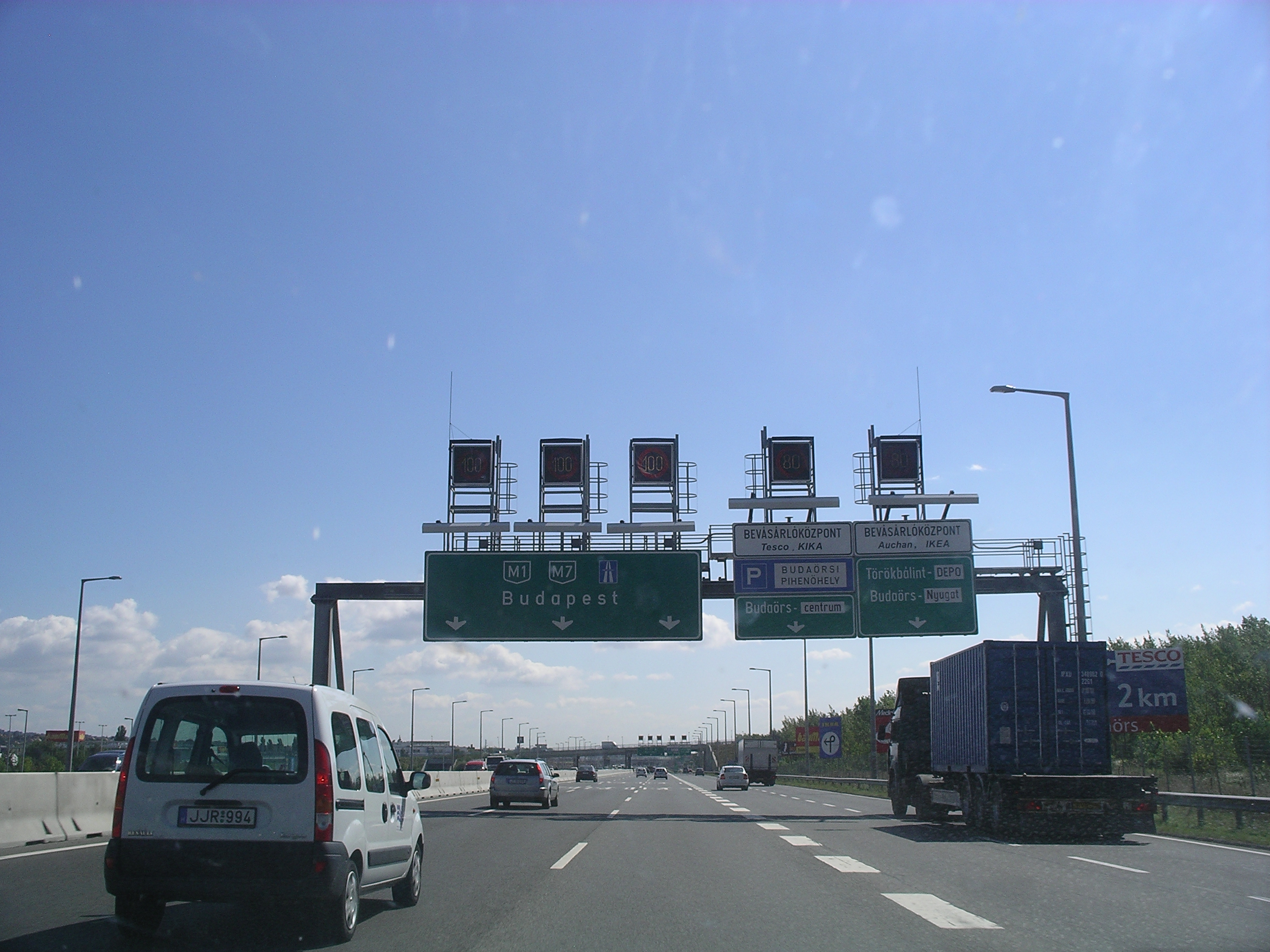
Junction near Budapest

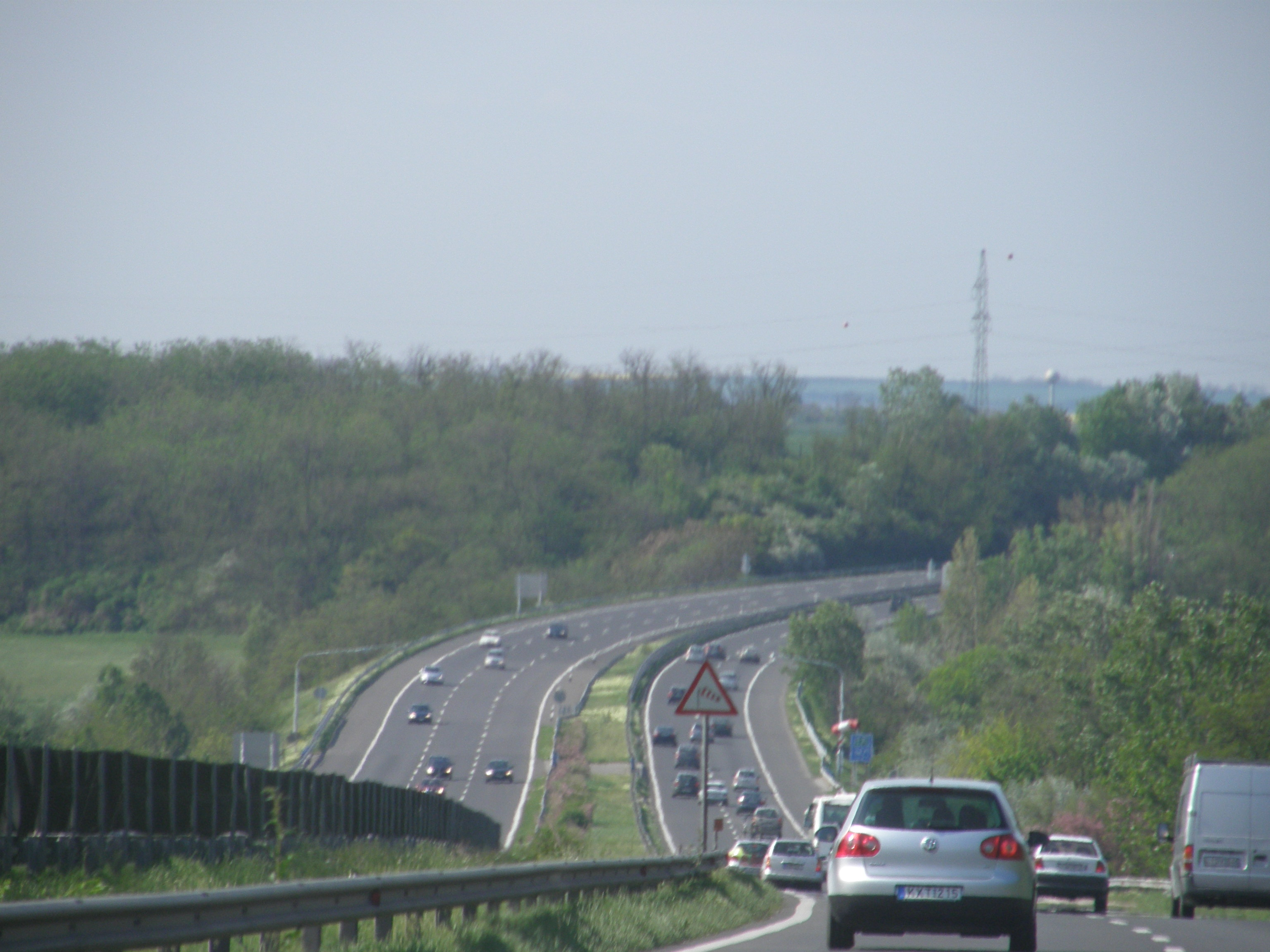
The motorway between Budapest and Székesfehérvár

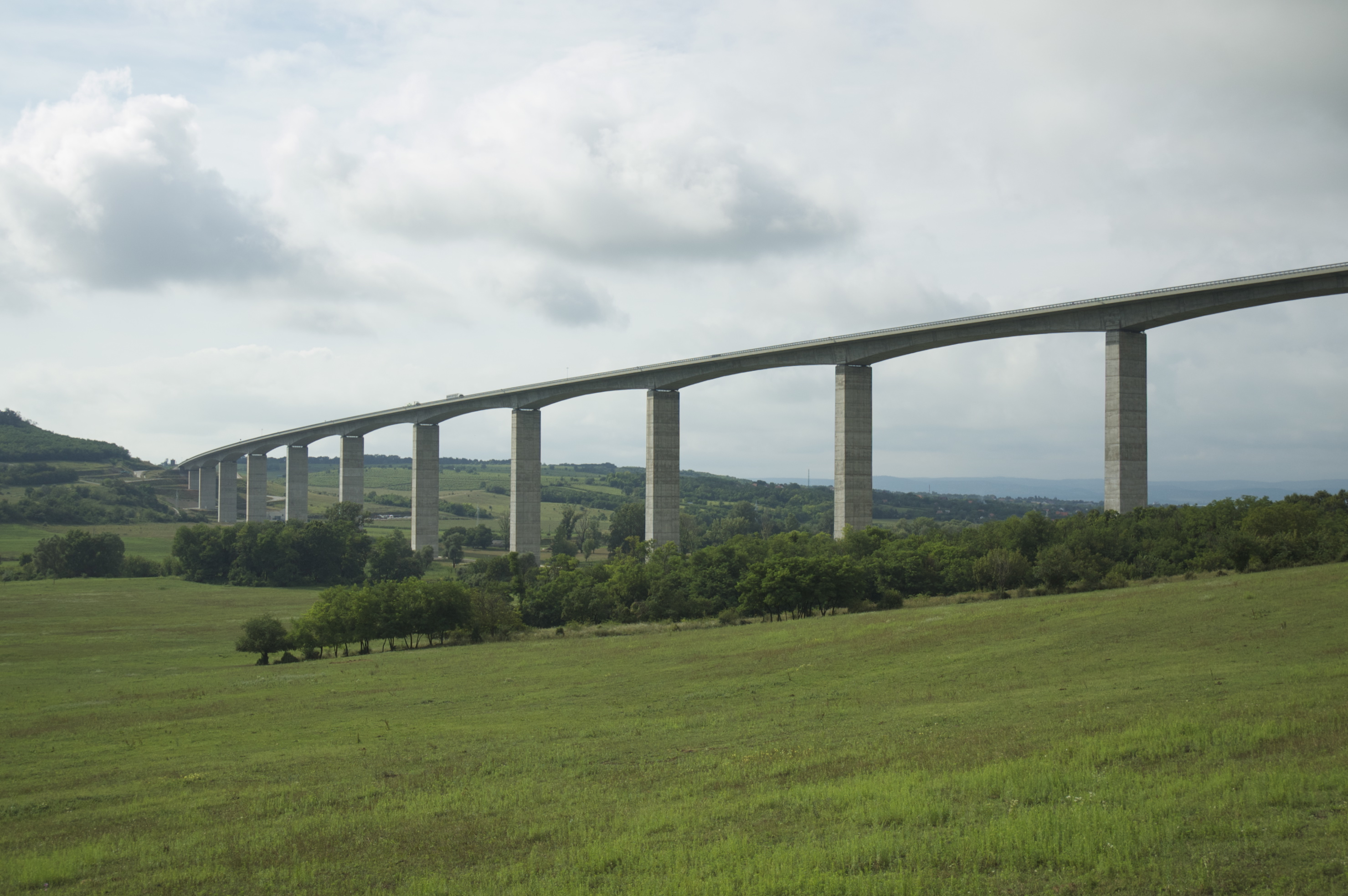
Köröshegyi völgyhíd

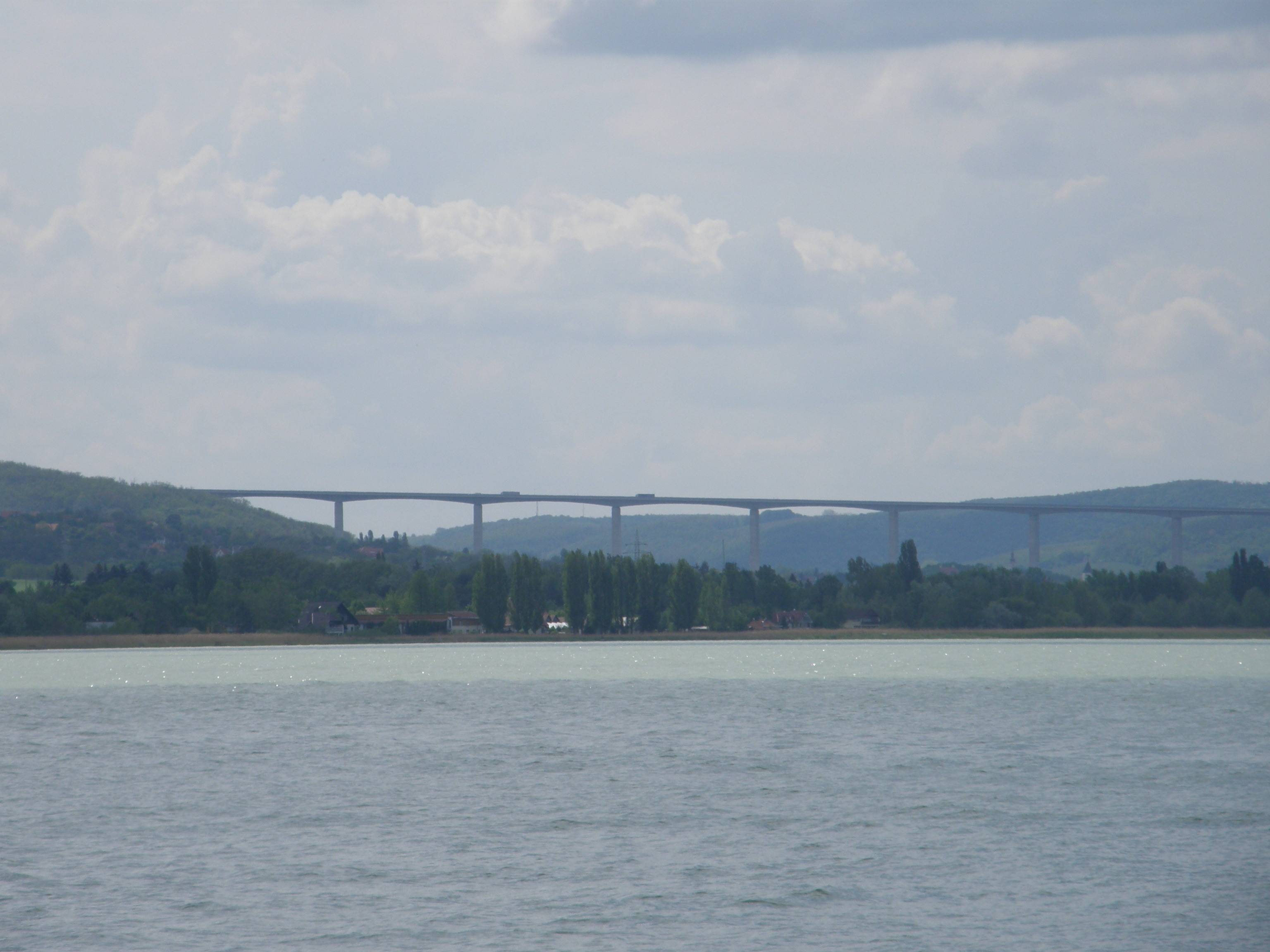
Köröshegyi völgyhíd from Balaton

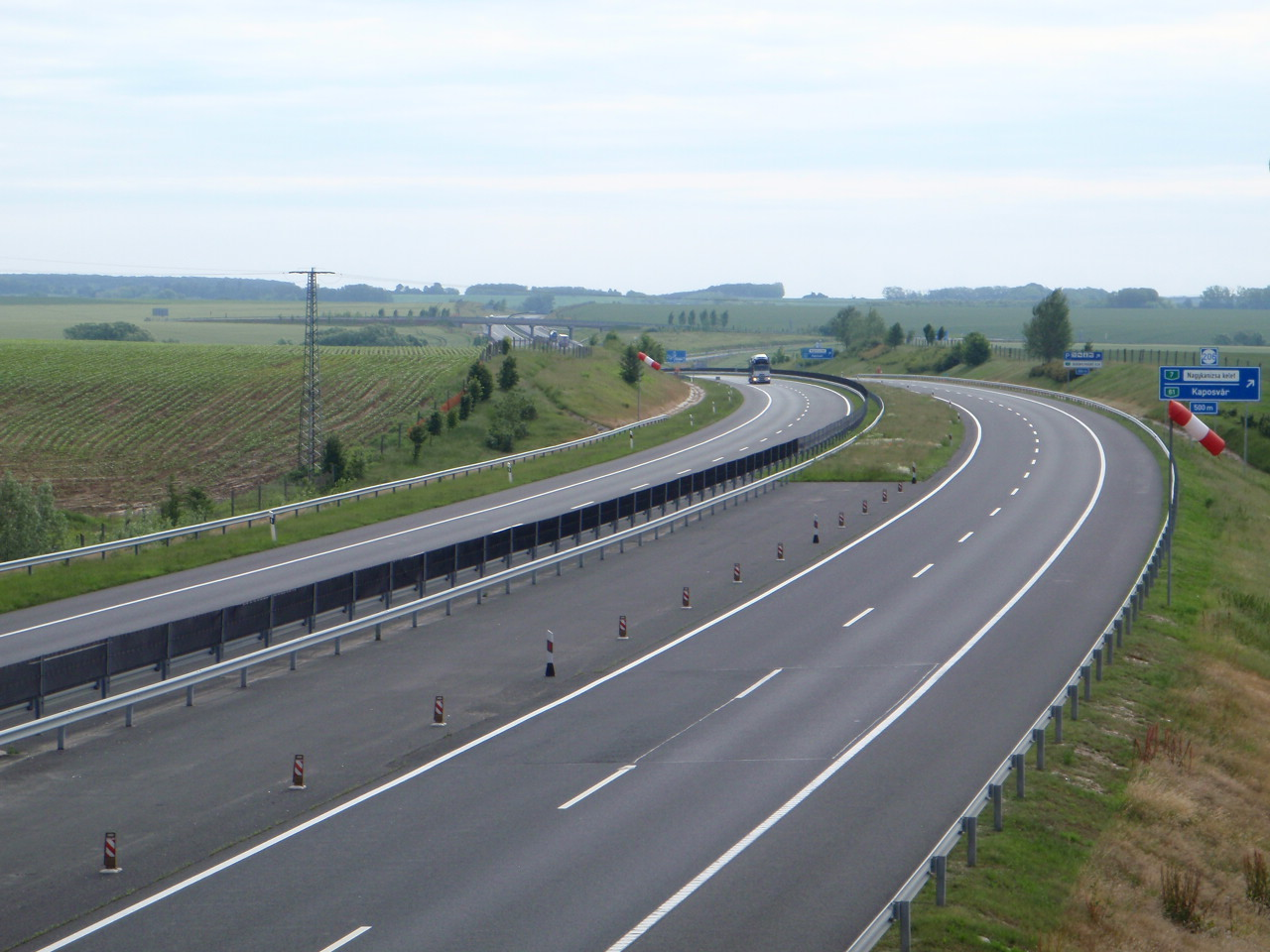
The road near Nagykanizsa

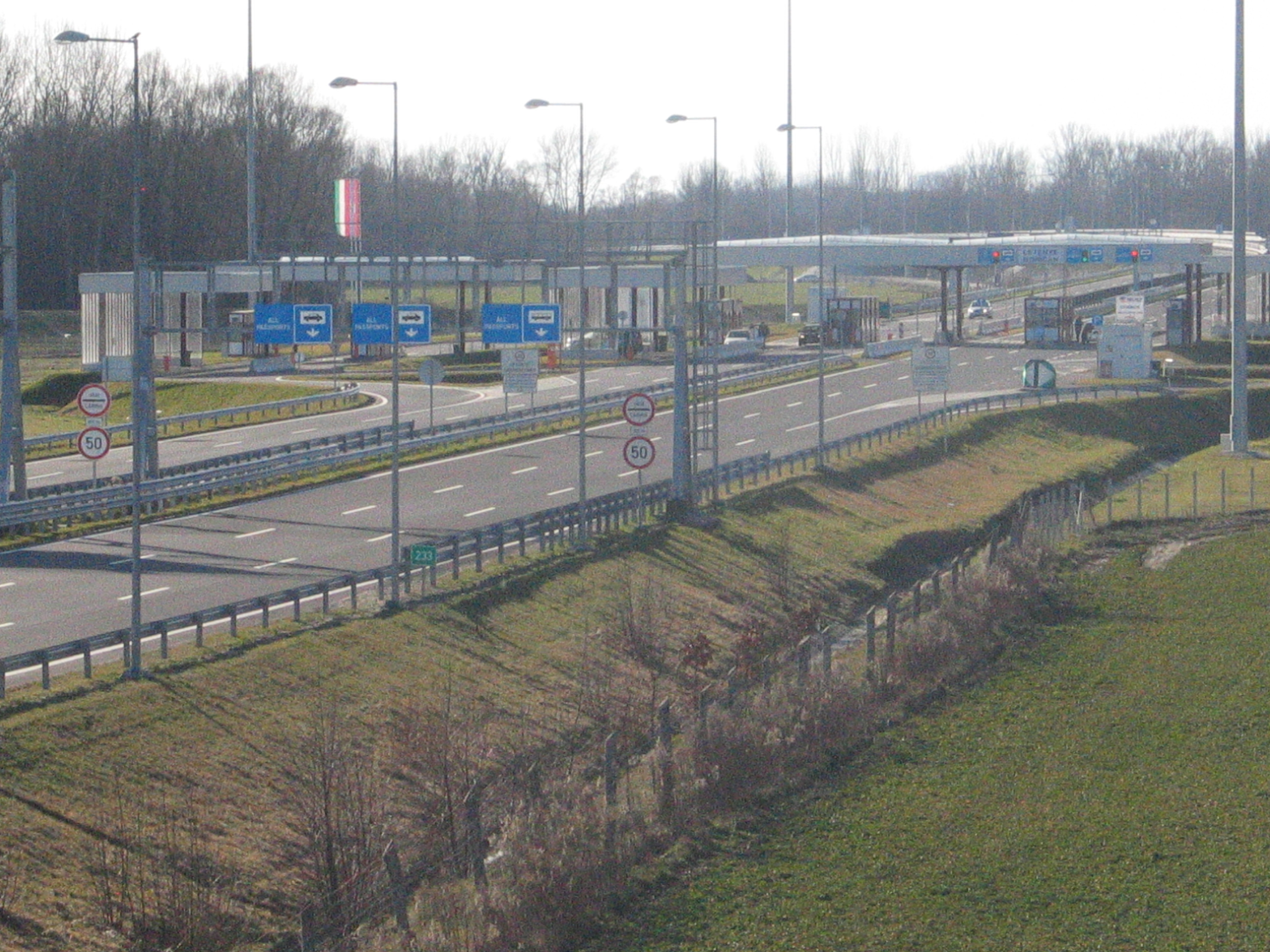
Hungarian-Croatian border

The M7 motorway (Hungarian: M7-es autópálya) is a Hungarian motorway which runs from Budapest towards the Croatian border at Letenye, reaching Székesfehérvár, then Siófok, a town on Lake Balaton, and the city of Nagykanizsa in the southwest of the country. M7 is the first highway of the country, its first section was opened in 1965.

The motorway connects with the Croatian motorway A4 at Goričan and forms part of the Pan-European corridor Vb, connecting Budapest with Zagreb, the capital of Croatia, and Rijeka, the largest Croatian seaport. Since the completion of the M7 it is possible to travel on motorway from Budapest to the Adriatic Sea, a popular tourist destination for Hungarians.

The last portion of the motorway to the Croatian border, including the Zrinski Bridge on the river Mura, was completed on 22 October 2008. The road's first sections were built in the 1960s and 1970s. The completion of the last sections was undertaken since 2001.

== Openings timeline ==
- Budapest – Budaörs (7 km): 1964 - half profile; (this section was extended 2x3 lane in 1978-79)
- Budaörs – Martonvásár (18 km): 1966 - half profile; (this section was extended in 1972; 2x3 lane in 2001)
- Martonvásár – Velence (15 km): 1967 - half profile; (this section was extended in 1973; 2x3 lane in 2001)
- Martonvásár – Székesfehérvár (12 km): 1968 - half profile; (this section was extended in 1973; 2x3 lane in 2001)
- Székesfehérvár – Balatonaliga (33 km): 1970 - half profile; (this section was extended in 1975)
- Balatonaliga – Zamárdi (22 km): 1971 - half profile; (this section was extended in 2001)
- Zamárdi – Balatonszárszó with Kőröshegy Viaduct (14.2 km): 8 August 2007
- Balatonszárszó – Ordacsehi (20 km): June 2005
- Ordacsehi – Balatonkeresztúr (25.7 km): 27 March 2006
- Balatonkeresztúr – Zalakomár (21 km): 26 June 2008
- Zalakomár – Nagykanizsa (15 km): 19 August 2008
- Nagykanizsa – Sormás (11.3 km): 24 August 2007
- Sormás (Eszteregnye) – Becsehely (4.5 km): 11 December 2006
- Becsehely – Letenye (6.5 km): 18 September 2004
- Letenye ( (Croatia) border) with Zrínyi Bridge (800 m): 22 October 2008

== Junctions, exits and rest area ==
Distance from Zero Kilometre Stone (Adam Clark Square) in Budapest in kilometres.

- The route is full length motorway. The maximum speed limit is 130 km/h, with (2x2 lane road with stop lane).

| km | | Destinations | Route | Notes |
|---|---|---|---|---|
| 6 | Exit | Budapest, Budaörsi út | 1 7 | Connection to Budapest via Budaörsi út. The road has commons section as M7 motorway, Main road 1 and 7. The eastern terminus of the motorway |
| 7 | Exit | Budaörs | | Connection to the City of Budapest via Egér út and Budaörs. |
| 9 | Exit | Budaörs | 81101 | Drive only towards Budapest. Shopping centers |
| 10 | Exit | Budaörs-kelet Budaörs rest area | | Eastern connection to Budaörs via Garibaldi utca. MOL / MOL + |
| 11 | Exit | Budaörs-nuygat | 8105 | Western connection to Budaörs. Shopping centers |
| 12 | Interchange | M7-M1 intersection | M1 | Connection to M1 motorway towards to Austria via Tatabánya, Győr |
| 14 | Exit | Törökbálint | 8102 | |
| 16 | Interchange | Érd-észak (Budapest bypass) | M0 E60 E71 E75 | Connection to Győr and Pécs, Szeged, Budapest International Airport, Szolnok, Nyíregyháza, Vác. The northern terminus of European routes E71 concurrency |
| 18 | Exit | Érd | 8103 | |
| 19 | Rest area | Érd rest area | | Parking only on the side leading to Budapest |
| 23 | Exit | Tárnok | 8107 | Connection to Sóskút and Pusztazámor |
| 26 | Rest area | Tárnok rest area | | Lukoil / Lukoil + |
Border of Pest and Fejér Counties
| 30 | Exit | Martonvásár, Gyúró | 81108 | |
| 33 | Rest area | Váli-völgy rest area Baracska, Vál | 8111 | OMV / OMV + |
| 42 | Exit | Kápolnásnyék, Vereb, Pázmánd | 8117 | |
| 45 | Rest area | Velencei rest area Velence, Nadap, Tata | 8119 8116 | MOL / MOL + |
| 50 | Exit | Pákozd, Sukoró Pákozd rest area | 8116 | |
| 57 | Exit | Székesfehérvár-kelet, Agárd | 7 | Eastern connection to Székesfehérvár |
| 60 | Exit | Székesfehérvár-centrum, Dunaújváros Fehérvár rest area | 62 | Connection to Industrial area of Székesfehérvár Shell / Shell + |
| 64 | Exit | Székesfehérvár-dél, Sárbogárd (Székesfehérvár bypass) | 8 E66 63 | Southern part of Székesfehérvár bypass The eastern terminus of European routes E66 |
| 70 | Exit | Szabadbattyán, Tác-Gorsium Gorsium rest area | 6307 | |
| 80 | Exit | Lepsény, Polgárdi | 7 | |
| 83 | Rest area | Lepsény rest area | | MOL / MOL + |
Border of Fejér and Veszprém Counties
| 90 | Interchange | M7-M8(710) interchange | M8 E66 710 | Connection to Veszprém towards Austria or Dunaújváros towards to Szolnok |
| 90 | Exit | Balatonfüred, Enying | 71 | |
Border of Veszprém and Somogy Counties
| 95 | Rest area | Sóstó rest area | | MOL / MOL + |
| 98 | Exit | Siófok-kelet | 7 | Eastern connection to Siófok |
| 101 | Rest area | Szabadi rest area | | |
| | Bridge | Sió (Bridge - 71.6 m) | | |
| 105 | Exit | Siófok-Centrum, Szekszárd | 65 | Connection to Central part of Siófok |
| 109 | Rest area | Töreki rest area | | |
| 112 | Exit | Siófok-nyugat, Zamárdi-felső, Szántód | 7 | Western connection to Siófok, and eastern to Zamárdi, toward to |
| 115 | Exit | Balatonendréd, Zamárdi-alsó | 6501 | Connection to Tab |
| 121 | Exit | Balatonföldvár, Bálványos | 65116 | |
| 121-22 | Viaduct | Kőröshegy Viaduct (1872 m) | | Longest Bridge in Hungary |
| 126 | Exit | Balatonszárszó | 7 | |
| 130 | Exit | Balatonőszöd, Szólád | 6524 | |
| 135 | Exit | Balatonszemes, Balatonlelle | 67 | Connection to Kaposvár and Szigetvár |
| 138 | Rest area | Balatonlelle rest area | | MOL / MOL + |
| 143 | Exit | Balatonboglár, Lengyeltóti | 6711 | |
| 145 | Exit | Ordacsehi | 67101 | Connection to Jankovichtelep (Balatonboglár) |
| 150 | Exit | Fonyód | 6701 | Connection to Lengyeltóti and Kaposvár |
| 156 | Rest area | Táska rest area | | |
| 160 | Exit | Balatonfenyves, Táska | 7 | |
| 168 | Rest area | Keresztúr rest area | | Shell / Shell + |
| 170 | Exit | Balatonkeresztúr, Balatonszentgyörgy | 68 / E661 / 76 | Connection to Marcali, Barcs and Zalaegerszeg The northern terminus of European routes E661 |
| 175 | Exit | Hollád | M76 / 6803 | |
| 177 | Rest area | Szegerdő rest area | | |
| 183 | Exit | Sávoly, Balatonring | 7 | |
Border of Somogy and Zala Counties
| 191 | Exit | Zalakomár, Zalakaros | 7 | |
| 194 | Rest area | Zalakomár rest area | | ORLEN / ORLEN + |
| 206 | Exit | Nagykanizsa-kelet, Kaposvár | 61 | Eastern bypass to Nagykanizsa toward to Kaposvár |
| 211 | Exit | Nagykanizsa-Centrum, Gyékényes, Zalaegerszeg | 74 / E65 | Connection to Central part of Nagykanizsa or Zalaegerszeg The eastern terminus of European routes E65 |
| 215 | Rest area | Sormás rest area | | |
| 219 | Exit | Sormás, Eszteregnye | 7 | |
| 224 | Exit | Becsehely | 7536 | |
| 232 | Interchange | Letenye M7-M70 interchange | M70 / E653 | Connection to M70 motorway, towards to Slovenia The eastern terminus of European routes E653 |
| 233 | Border control | Letenye (H) – Goričan (HR) border crossing | | |
| 233 | Bridge | Mura (Zrínyi Bridge - 216 m) | | |
A4 motorway → to Zagreb, Croatia

- Planned section

== Maintenance ==
The operation and maintenance of the road by Hungarian Public Road Nonprofit Pte Ltd Co. This activity is provided by these highway engineers.

- near Martonvásár, kilometre trench 30
- near Balatonvilágos, kilometre trench 90
- near Fonyód, kilometre trench 150
- near Eszteregnye, kilometre trench 219

== Payment ==
From 1 February 2015, the motorway can be used instead of the national sticker with the following county stickers:

| Type of vignette | Available section |
|---|---|
| Pest County | between Egér Street junction and Martonvásár (7 km – 30 km) |
| Fejér County | between Pusztazámor and Balatonvilágos (23 km – 90 km) |
| Veszprém County | between Polgárdi and Siófok east (80 km – 98 km) |
| Somogy County | between Balatonvilágos and Zalakomár (90 km – 191 km) |
| Zala County | between Sávoly and Letenye [state border] (183 km – 234 km) |

=== Toll-free section ===
- From Border of Budapest to Egér Street section (5 km – 7 km) can be used free of charge.

== Significant artifacts ==
From Budapest to the Croatian border, the M7 motorway features the following bridges, tunnels or covered cuts:

Bridge

- Zrinski Bridge (Zrínyi Miklós híd; 216 m or 709 ft) over Mur river

Viaduct

- Köröshegy Viaduct (Kőröshegyi völgyhíd; 1,872 m or 6,142 ft) – Longest bridge in Hungary

== European Routes ==
| Name | Route |
| | 217 km | junction (16) – (Croatia) Autocesta A4 |
| | 22 km | Nagykanizsa-centrum (211) – (Croatia) Autocesta A4 |

== See also ==
- Roads in Hungary
- Transport in Hungary
- International E-road network
