= Zalakomár =

Coordinates: 46°33′N 17°11′E

- Village
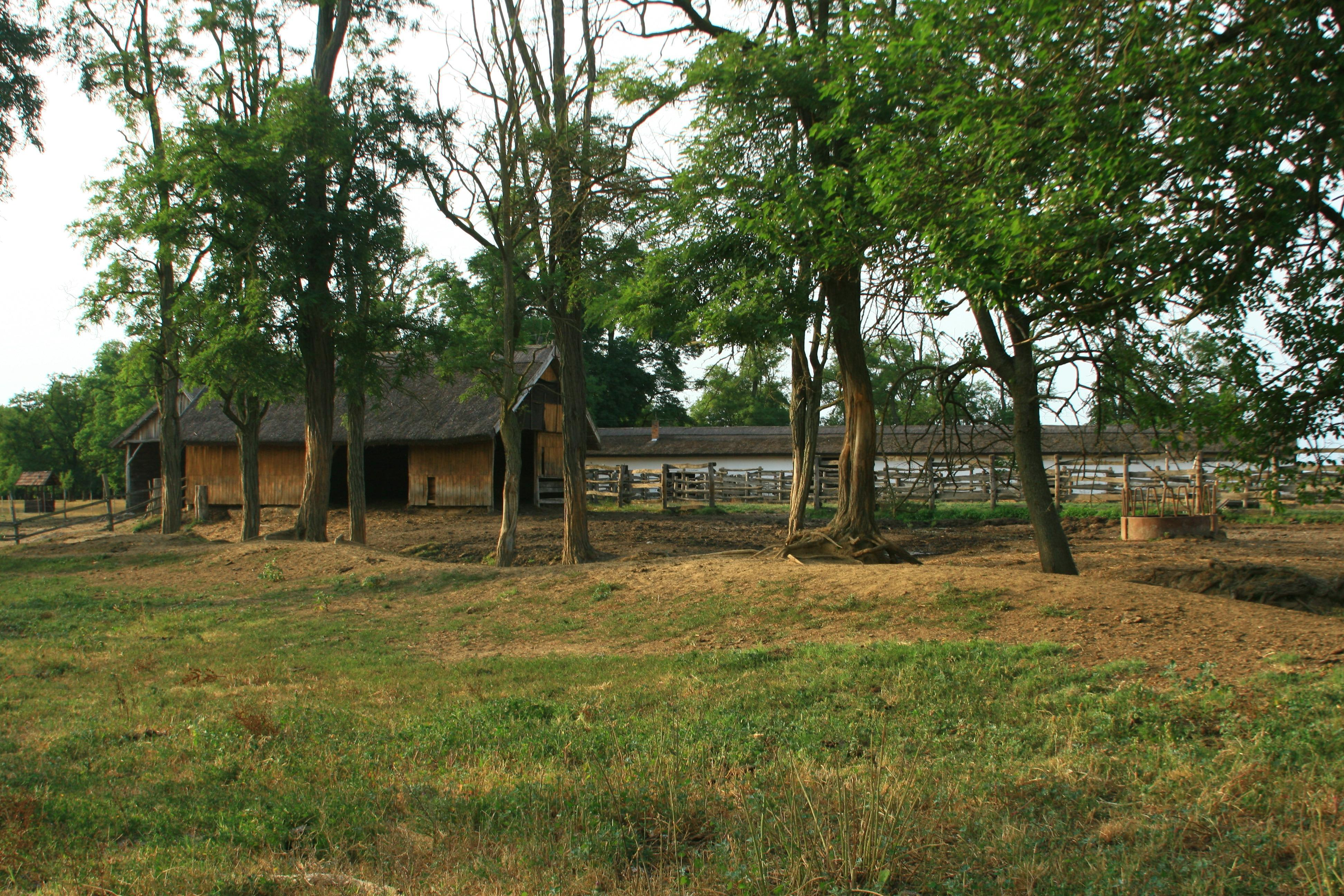
- Zalakomár, Kiskomárom, 8751 Hungary - panoramio
- Interactive map of Zalakomár
- Country: Hungary
- Region: Western Transdanubia
- County: Zala County
- Time zone: UTC+1 (CET)
  - Summer (DST): UTC+2 (CEST)
- Motorways: M7
- Distance from Budapest: 192 km (119 mi) Northeast

Zalakomár is a village in Zala County, Hungary.
