= Megyehíd =

- Coat of arms

- Location of Megyehíd in Hungary
- Coordinates: 47.20986°N 16.84075°E
- Country: Hungary
- Region: Western Transdanubia
- County: Vas
- Subregion: Sárvári
- Rank: Village

Area
  - Total: 6.04 km^{2} (2.33 sq mi)

Population (1 January 2008)
  - Total: 345
  - Density: 57.1/km^{2} (148/sq mi)
- Time zone: UTC+1 (CET)
  - Summer (DST): UTC+2 (CEST)
- Postal code: 9754
- Area code: +36
- KSH code: 30872
- Website: https://megyehid.hu/

Megyehíd is a village in Vas county, Hungary.
