= Eszteregnye =

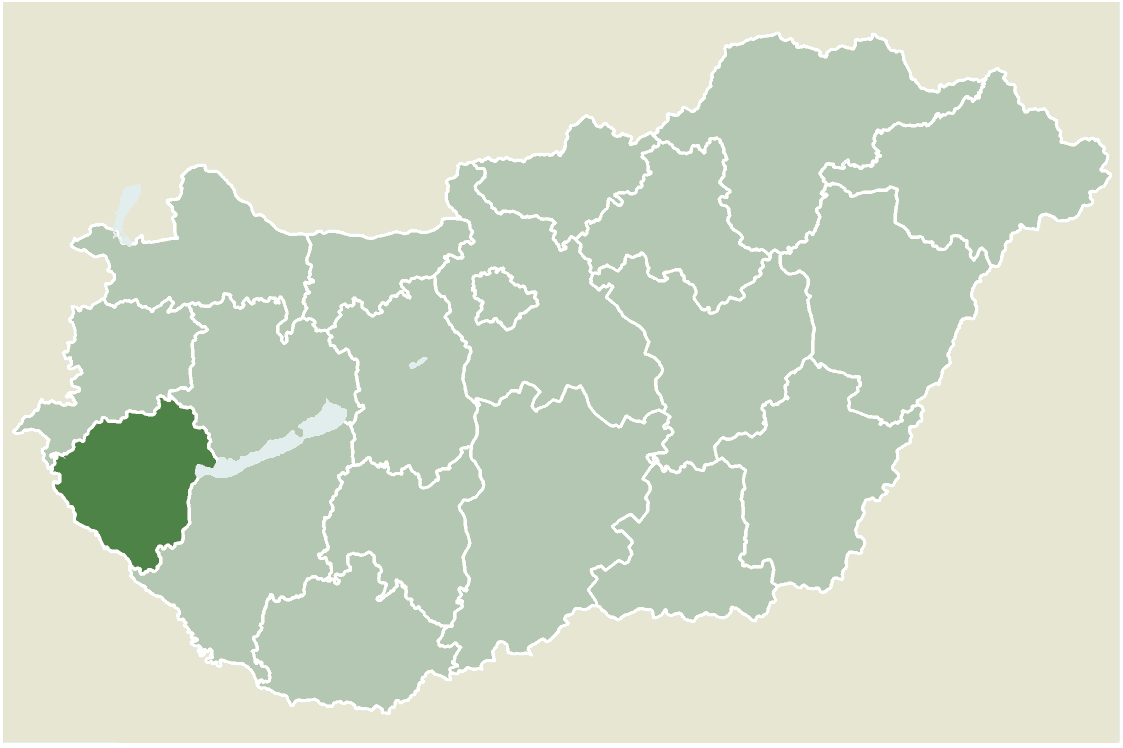
- Location of Zala county in Hungary

- Location of Eszteregnye
- Coordinates: 46.47137°N 16.88273°E
- Country: Hungary
- County: Zala

Area
  - Total: 20.09 km^{2} (7.76 sq mi)

Population (2004)
  - Total: 767
  - Density: 38.17/km^{2} (98.9/sq mi)
- Time zone: UTC+1 (CET)
  - Summer (DST): UTC+2 (CEST)
- Postal code: 8882
- Area code: 93
- Motorways: M7
- Distance from Budapest: 220 km (140 mi) Northeast

Eszteregnye (Croatian: Strugna) is a village in Zala County, Hungary.
