= Mikosszéplak =

- Coat of arms

- Location of Mikosszéplak in Hungary
- Coordinates: 47.03195°N 16.97396°E
- Country: Hungary
- Region: Western Transdanubia
- County: Vas
- Subregion: Vasvári
- Rank: Village

Area
  - Total: 18.66 km^{2} (7.20 sq mi)

Population (1 January 2008)
  - Total: 339
  - Density: 18.2/km^{2} (47.1/sq mi)
- Time zone: UTC+1 (CET)
  - Summer (DST): UTC+2 (CEST)
- Postal code: 9835
- Area code: +36 94
- KSH code: 30599

Mikosszéplak is a village in Vas county, Hungary.
