= Misefa =

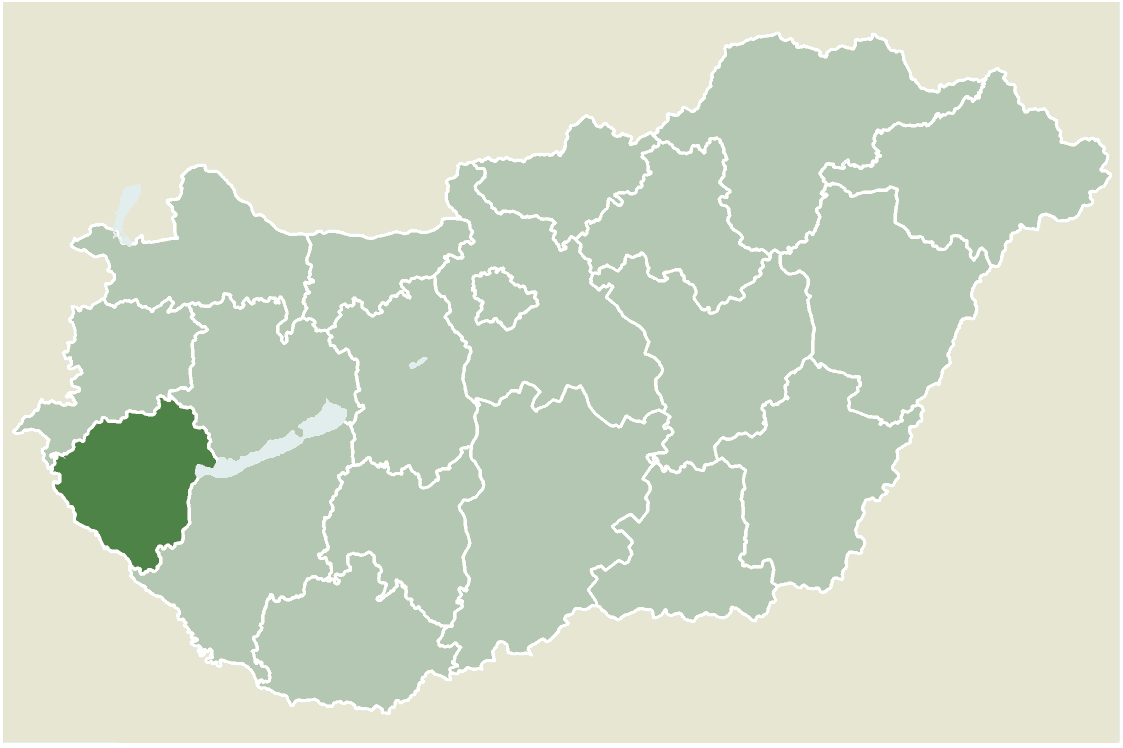
- Location of Zala county in Hungary

- Location of Misefa
- Coordinates: 46.80327°N 16.98647°E
- Country: Hungary
- County: Zala County

Area
  - Total: 6.51 km^{2} (2.51 sq mi)

Population (2004)
  - Total: 302
  - Density: 46.39/km^{2} (120.1/sq mi)
- Time zone: UTC+1 (CET)
  - Summer (DST): UTC+2 (CEST)
- Postal code: 8935
- Area code: 92

Misefa is a village in Zala county, Hungary, in the Zala Hills. It is located 15 km from Keszthely and 30 km from Zalaegerszeg.

== History ==
Misefa was first mentioned in documents as Myxefolva (in 1352), but it has existed since the 13th century. According to a local legend the name (from "mise", meaning mass, and "fa", meaning tree) originates from the fact that the village didn't have a church and masses were held under the branches of a walnut tree.

== Tourist sights ==
- Old manor (now a hotel)
- Fish pond surrounded by a park

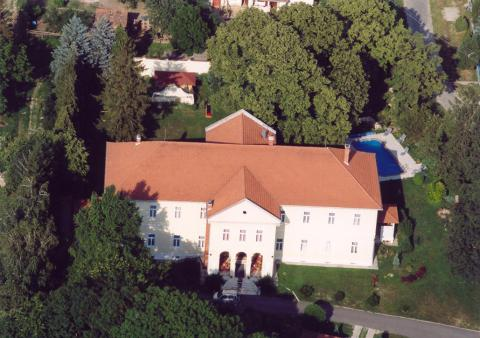
Aerial photography of the manor
