= Magyarszerdahely =

- Village
- Flag Coat of arms

- Location of Magyarszerdahely
- Coordinates: 46.55457°N 16.93710°E
- Country: Hungary
- Region: Western Transdanubia
- County: Zala
- District: Nagykanizsa

Area
  - Total: 16.22 km^{2} (6.26 sq mi)

Population (1 January 2026)
  - Total: 413
  - Density: 25.5/km^{2} (65.9/sq mi)
- Time zone: UTC+1 (CET)
  - Summer (DST): UTC+2 (CEST)
- Postal code: 8776
- Area code: (+36) 93

Magyarszerdahely is a village in Zala County, Hungary.
