= Miháld =

- Village
- Flag Coat of arms

- Location of Miháld
- Coordinates: 46.45268°N 17.12516°E
- Country: Hungary
- Region: Western Transdanubia
- County: Zala
- District: Nagykanizsa

Area
  - Total: 21.64 km^{2} (8.36 sq mi)

Population (1 January 2026)
  - Total: 669
  - Density: 30.9/km^{2} (80.1/sq mi)
- Time zone: UTC+1 (CET)
  - Summer (DST): UTC+2 (CEST)
- Postal code: 8825
- Area code: (+36) 93
- Website: www.mihald.hu

Miháld is a village in Zala County, Hungary.
