= Zala County 3rd constituency =

Coordinates: 46°27′21″N 16°59′51″E

Zala County 3rd constituency (Nagykanizsa)
- Constituency for the National Assembly
- Location of Zala county 03 within Zala county

- Location of Zala county within Hungary
- County: Zala
- Electorate: 71,793 (2022)
- Major settlements: Nagykanizsa

Current constituency
- Created: 2011
- Party: Tisza Party
- Member: Csaba Lovkó
- Elected: 2026

The 3rd constituency of Zala County (Hungarian: Zala megyei 03. számú országgyűlési egyéni választókerület) is one of the single member constituencies of the National Assembly, the national legislature of Hungary. The constituency standard abbreviation: Zala 03. OEVK.

Since 2026, it has been represented by Csaba Lovkó of the Tisza Party.

== Geography ==
The 3rd constituency is located in southern part of Zala County.

=== List of municipalities ===
The constituency includes the following municipalities:

1. Bánokszentgyörgy
2. Bázakerettye
3. Becsehely
4. Belezna
5. Bocska
6. Borsfa
7. Börzönce
8. Bucsuta
9. Csapi
10. Csertalakos
11. Csömödér
12. Csörnyeföld
13. Dobri
14. Eszteregnye
15. Fityeház
16. Fűzvölgy
17. Galambok
18. Gelsesziget
19. Gutorfölde
20. Homokkomárom
21. Hosszúvölgy
22. Iklódbördőce
23. Kacorlak
24. Kányavár
25. Kerkaszentkirály
26. Kerkateskánd
27. Kiscsehi
28. Kisrécse
29. Kistolmács
30. Kissziget
31. Lasztonya
32. Letenye
33. Lispeszentadorján
34. Liszó
35. Lovászi
36. Magyarszentmiklós
37. Magyarszerdahely
38. Maróc
39. Miháld
40. Molnári
41. Murakeresztúr
42. Murarátka
43. Muraszemenye
44. Nagybakónak
45. Nagykanizsa
46. Nagyrécse
47. Nemespátró
48. Oltárc
49. Ortaháza
50. Páka
51. Pat
52. Petrivente
53. Pördefölde
54. Pusztaederics
55. Pusztamagyaród
56. Pusztaszentlászló
57. Rigyác
58. Sand
59. Semjénháza
60. Sormás
61. Surd
62. Szécsisziget
63. Szentkozmadombja
64. Szentliszló
65. Szentmargitfalva
66. Szentpéterfölde
67. Szepetnek
68. Tófej
69. Tormafölde
70. Tornyiszentmiklós
71. Tótszentmárton
72. Tótszerdahely
73. Újudvar
74. Valkonya
75. Várfölde
76. Zajk
77. Zalakomár
78. Zalasárszeg
79. Zalaszentbalázs
80. Zalaszentjakab
81. Zalaújlak
82. Zebecke

== Members ==
The constituency has been represented by Péter Cseresnyés of the Fidesz from 2014, and he was re-elected in 2018 and again in 2022.

Election	Member	Party	%
2014	Péter Cseresnyés	Fidesz	
2018	Péter Cseresnyés	Fidesz	
2022	Péter Cseresnyés	Fidesz	52.9
2026	Csaba Lovkó	Tisza	55.4
