= Letenye District =

Letenye District Letenyei járás
- Districts of Hungary
- Coat of arms

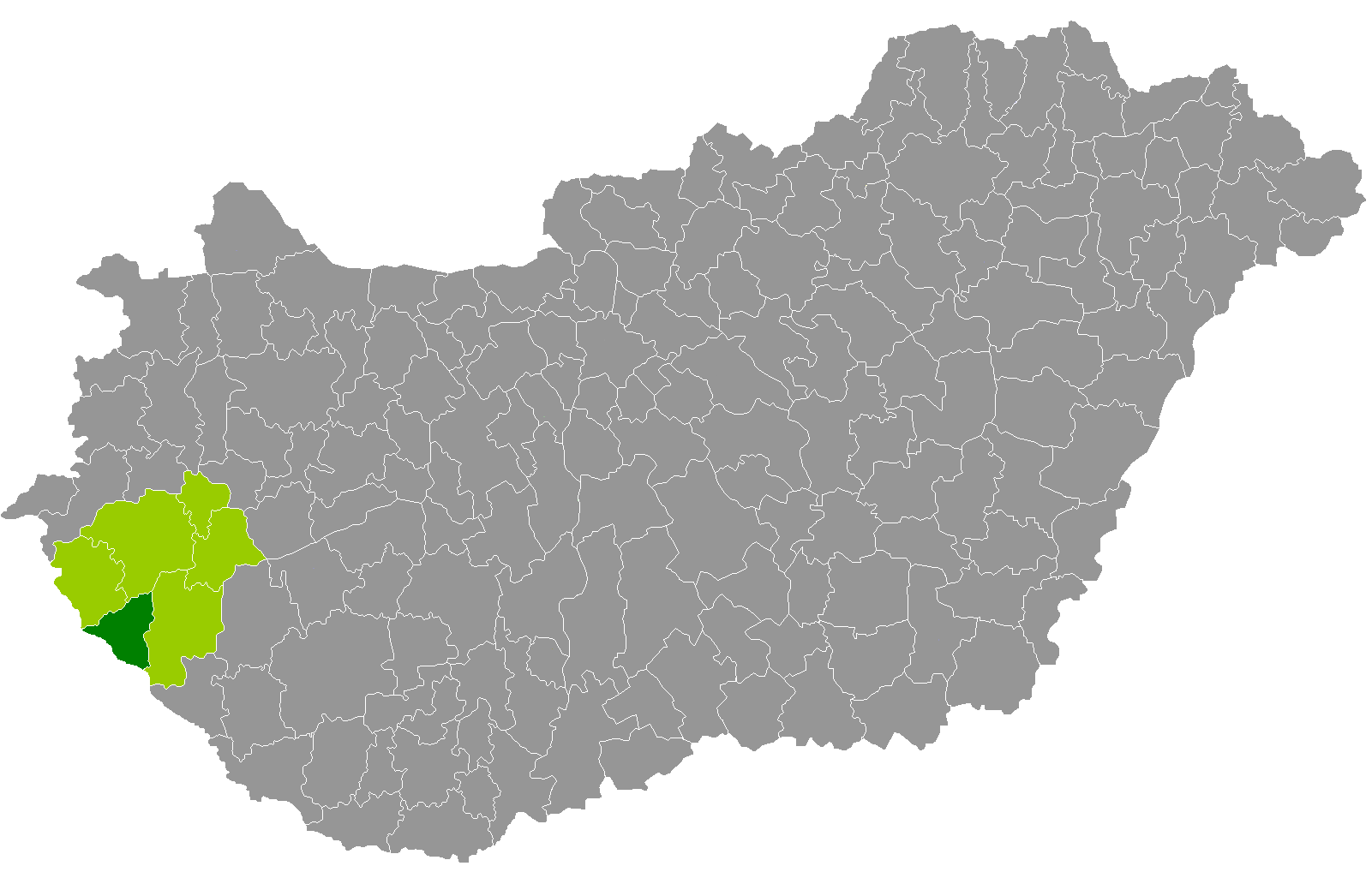
- Letenye District within Hungary and Zala County.
- Coordinates: 46.43°N 16.73°E
- Country: Hungary
- County: Zala
- District seat: Letenye

Area
  - Total: 388.69 km^{2} (150.07 sq mi)
  - Rank: 5th in Zala

Population (2011 census)
  - Total: 16,410
  - Rank: 5th in Zala
  - Density: 42/km^{2} (110/sq mi)

Letenye (Hungarian: Letenyei járás) is a district in south-western part of Zala County. Letenye is also the name of the town where the district seat is found. The district is located in the Western Transdanubia Statistical Region.

== Geography ==
Letenye District borders with Lenti District to the northwest, Zalaegerszeg District to the north, Nagykanizsa District to the east, the Croatian county of Međimurje and Slovenia to the southwest. The number of inhabited places in Letenye District is 27. The seat of the Letenye district was Letenye since the first designation of the permanent district seats (1886).

== Municipalities ==
The district has 1 town and 26 villages. (ordered by population, as of 1 January 2013)

- Bánokszentgyörgy (650)
- Bázakerettye (861)
- Becsehely (2,080)
- Borsfa (736)
- Bucsuta (227)
- Csörnyeföld (420)
- Kerkaszentkirály (228)
- Kiscsehi (170)
- Kistolmács (181)
- Lasztonya (86)
- **Letenye** (4,202) – district seat
- Lispeszentadorján (289)
- Maróc (76)
- Molnári (718)
- Murarátka (245)
- Muraszemenye (626)
- Oltárc (283)
- Petrivente (362)
- Pusztamagyaród (576)
- Semjénháza (601)
- Szentliszló (281)
- Szentmargitfalva (85)
- Tótszentmárton (840)
- Tótszerdahely (1,096)
- Valkonya (55)
- Várfölde (191)
- Zajk (248)

The bolded municipality is city.

== See also ==
- List of cities and towns in Hungary
