= List of populated places in Hungary (P) =

This is a list of cities, towns and villages of Hungary

KEY: T = Town ; V = Village

Name	Rank	County	District	Population	Post code
Pácin	V	Borsod-Abaúj-Zemplén	Bodrogközi	1,498	3964
Pacsa	V	Zala	Zalaegerszegi	1,904	8761
Pácsony	V	Tolna	Vasvári	313	9823
Padár	V	Zala	Zalaegerszegi	149	8935
Páhi	V	Bács-Kiskun	Kiskorösi	1,265	6075
Páka	V	Zala	Lenti	1,282	8956
Pakod	V	Zala	Zalaszentgróti	998	8799
Pákozd	V	Fejér	Gárdonyi	2,762	8095
Paks	T	Tolna	Paksi	20,943	7030
Palé	V	Baranya	Sásdi	118	7370
Pálfa	V	Tolna	Paksi	1,820	7042
Pálfiszeg	V	Zala	Zalaegerszegi	214	8917
Pálháza	V	Borsod-Abaúj-Zemplén	Sátoraljaújhelyi	1,143	3994
Páli	V	Gyor-Moson-Sopron	Csornai	410	9345
Palkonya	V	Baranya	Siklósi	303	7771
Pálmajor	V	Somogy	Kaposvári	340	7561
Pálmonostora	V	Bács-Kiskun	Kiskunfélegyházi	2,060	6112
Palotabozsok	V	Baranya	Mohácsi	1,071	7727
Palotás	V	Nógrád	Pásztói	1,729	3042
Paloznak	V	Veszprém	Balatonfüredi	401	8229
Pamlény	V	Borsod-Abaúj-Zemplén	Encsi	63	3821
Pamuk	V	Somogy	Lengyeltóti	273	8698
Pánd	V	Pest	Nagykátai	2,027	2214
Pankasz	V	Tolna	Oriszentpéteri	485	9937
Pannonhalma	T	Gyor-Moson-Sopron	Pannonhalmi	4,022	9090
Pányok	V	Borsod-Abaúj-Zemplén	Abaúj–Hegyközi	100	3898
Panyola	V	Szabolcs-Szatmár-Bereg	Fehérgyarmati	642	4913
Pap	V	Szabolcs-Szatmár-Bereg	Kisvárdai	1,805	4631
Pápa	T	Veszprém	Pápai	33,353	8500
Pápadereske	V	Veszprém	Pápai	265	8593
Pápakovácsi	V	Veszprém	Pápai	594	8596
Pápasalamon	V	Veszprém	Pápai	403	8594
Pápateszér	V	Veszprém	Pápai	1,295	8556
Papkeszi	V	Veszprém	Veszprémi	1,646	8183
Pápoc	V	Tolna	Celldömölki	393	9515
Papos	V	Szabolcs-Szatmár-Bereg	Mátészalkai	864	4338
Páprád	V	Baranya	Sellyei	202	7838
Parád	V	Heves	Pétervásárai	3,720	3240
Parádsasvár	V	Heves	Pétervásárai	1,696	3242
Parasznya	V	Borsod-Abaúj-Zemplén	Miskolci	1,299	3777
Paszab	V	Szabolcs-Szatmár-Bereg	Ibrány–Nagyhalászi	1,286	4475
Pásztó	T	Nógrád	Pásztói	10,279	3060
Pásztori	V	Gyor-Moson-Sopron	Csornai	405	9311
Pat	V	Zala	Nagykanizsai	257	8825
Patak	V	Nógrád	Balassagyarmati	1,012	2648
Patalom	V	Somogy	Kaposvári	389	7463
Patapoklosi	V	Baranya	Szigetvári	389	7922
Patca	V	Somogy	Kaposvári	72	7477
Pátka	V	Fejér	Székesfehérvári	1,649	8092
Patosfa	V	Somogy	Barcsi	304	7536
Pátroha	V	Szabolcs-Szatmár-Bereg	Kisvárdai	3,027	4523
Patvarc	V	Nógrád	Balassagyarmati	652	2668
Páty	V	Pest	Pilisvörösvári	5,454	2071
Pátyod	V	Szabolcs-Szatmár-Bereg	Csengeri	647	4766
Pázmánd	V	Fejér	Gárdonyi	2,026	2476
Pázmándfalu	V	Gyor-Moson-Sopron	Pannonhalmi	967	9085
Pécel	T	Pest	Gödölloi	13,008	2119
Pecöl	V	Tolna	Sárvári	810	9754
Pécs	county seat	Baranya	Pécsi	158,942	7600^{*}
Pécsbagota	V	Baranya	Szentlorinci	120	7951
Pécsdevecser	V	Baranya	Siklósi	110	7766
Pécsely	V	Veszprém	Balatonfüredi	554	8245
Pécsudvard	V	Baranya	Pécsi	644	7762
Pécsvárad	T	Baranya	Pécsváradi	4,087	7720
Pellérd	V	Baranya	Pécsi	1,984	7831
Pély	V	Heves	Hevesi	9,030	3381
Penc	V	Pest	Váci	1,377	2614
Penészlek	V	Szabolcs-Szatmár-Bereg	Nyírbátori	1,066	4267
Pénzesgyor	V	Veszprém	Zirci	368	8426
Penyige	V	Szabolcs-Szatmár-Bereg	Fehérgyarmati	768	4941
Pér	V	Gyor-Moson-Sopron	Gyori	2,385	9099
Perbál	V	Pest	Pilisvörösvári	2,139	2074
Pere	V	Borsod-Abaúj-Zemplén	Encsi	401	3853
Perecse	V	Borsod-Abaúj-Zemplén	Encsi	32	3821
Pereked	V	Baranya	Pécsváradi	183	7664
Perenye	V	Tolna	Szombathelyi	669	9722
Peresznye	V	Tolna	Koszegi	693	9734
Pereszteg	V	Gyor-Moson-Sopron	Sopron–Fertodi	1,377	9484
Perkáta	V	Fejér	Adonyi	4,175	2431
Perkupa	V	Borsod-Abaúj-Zemplén	Edelényi	930	3756
Perocsény	V	Pest	Szobi	401	2637
Peterd	V	Baranya	Siklósi	218	7766
Péterhida	V	Somogy	Barcsi	194	7582
Péteri	V	Pest	Monori	1,905	2209
Pétervására	T	Heves	Pétervásárai	3,387	3250
Pétfürdo	V	Veszprém	Várpalotai	4,917	8105
Pethohenye	V	Zala	Zalaegerszegi	394	8921
Petneháza	V	Szabolcs-Szatmár-Bereg	Baktalórántházai	1,972	4542
Petofibánya	V	Heves	Hatvani	133	3023
Petofiszállás	V	Bács-Kiskun	Kiskunfélegyházi	1,623	6113
Petoháza	V	Gyor-Moson-Sopron	Sopron–Fertodi	1,035	9443
Petomihályfa	V	Tolna	Vasvári	249	9826
Petrikeresztúr	V	Zala	Zalaegerszegi	434	8984
Petrivente	V	Zala	Letenyei	412	8866
Pettend	V	Baranya	Szigetvári	170	7972
Piliny	V	Nógrád	Szécsényi	634	3134
Pilis	V	Pest	Monori	10,905	2721
Pilisborosjeno	V	Pest	Pilisvörösvári	3,143	2097
Piliscsaba	V	Pest	Pilisvörösvári	6,515	2081
Piliscsév	V	Komárom-Esztergom	Dorogi	2,357	2519
Pilisjászfalu	V	Pest	Pilisvörösvári	1,081	2080
Pilismarót	V	Komárom-Esztergom	Esztergomi	1,996	2028
Pilisvörösvár	T	Pest	Pilisvörösvári	12,780	2085
Pilisszántó	V	Pest	Pilisvörösvári	2,203	2095
Pilisszentiván	V	Pest	Pilisvörösvári	4,101	2084
Pilisszentkereszt	V	Pest	Szentendrei	2,152	2098
Pilisszentlászló	V	Pest	Szentendrei	956	2009
Pincehely	V	Tolna	Tamási	2,564	7084
Pinkamindszent	V	Tolna	Körmendi	147	9922
Pinnye	V	Gyor-Moson-Sopron	Sopron–Fertodi	344	9481
Piricse	V	Szabolcs-Szatmár-Bereg	Nyírbátori	1,871	4375
Pirtó	V	Bács-Kiskun	Kiskunhalasi	995	6414
Piskó	V	Baranya	Sellyei	296	7838
Pitvaros	V	Csongrád	Makói	1,529	6914
Pócsa	V	Baranya	Mohácsi	182	7756
Pocsaj	V	Hajdú-Bihar	Berettyóújfalui	2,727	4125
Pócsmegyer	V	Pest	Szentendrei	1,244	2017
Pócspetri	V	Szabolcs-Szatmár-Bereg	Nyírbátori	1,869	4327
Pogány	V	Baranya	Pécsi	1,083	7666
Pogányszentpéter	V	Somogy	Csurgói	534	8728
Pókaszepetk	V	Zala	Zalaegerszegi	1,038	8932
Polány	V	Somogy	Kaposvári	241	7458
Polgár	T	Hajdú-Bihar	Polgári	8,438	4090
Polgárdi	T	Fejér	Székesfehérvári	6,689	8154
Pomáz	T	Pest	Szentendrei	14,818	2013
Porcsalma	V	Szabolcs-Szatmár-Bereg	Csengeri	2,769	4761
Pornóapáti	V	Tolna	Szombathelyi	384	9796
Poroszló	V	Heves	Füzesabonyi	10,904	3388
Porpác	V	Tolna	Sárvári	156	9612
Porrog	V	Somogy	Csurgói	256	8858
Porrogszentkirály	V	Somogy	Csurgói	356	8858
Porrogszentpál	V	Somogy	Csurgói	101	8858
Pórszombat	V	Zala	Lenti	362	8986
Porva	V	Veszprém	Zirci	507	8429
Pósfa	V	Tolna	Sárvári	309	9636
Potony	V	Somogy	Barcsi	276	7977
Potyond	V	Gyor-Moson-Sopron	Csornai	99	9324
Pölöske	V	Zala	Zalaegerszegi	891	8929
Pölöskefo	V	Zala	Nagykanizsai	478	8773
Pörböly	V	Tolna	Szekszárdi	613	7142
Pördefölde	V	Zala	Lenti	71	8956
Pötréte	V	Zala	Nagykanizsai	308	8767
Prügy	V	Borsod-Abaúj-Zemplén	Szerencsi	2,637	3925
Pula	V	Veszprém	Veszprémi	237	8291
Pusztaapáti	V	Zala	Lenti	41	8986
Pusztaberki	V	Nógrád	Rétsági	131	2658
Pusztacsalád	V	Gyor-Moson-Sopron	Sopron–Fertodi	259	9373
Pusztacsó	V	Tolna	Koszegi	164	9739
Pusztadobos	V	Szabolcs-Szatmár-Bereg	Baktalórántházai	1,360	4565
Pusztaederics	V	Zala	Zalaegerszegi	202	8946
Pusztafalu	V	Borsod-Abaúj-Zemplén	Sátoraljaújhelyi	268	3995
Pusztaföldvár	V	Békés	Orosházi	1,914	5919
Pusztahencse	V	Tolna	Paksi	1,086	7038
Pusztakovácsi	V	Somogy	Marcali	909	8707
Pusztamagyaród	V	Zala	Letenyei	661	8895
Pusztamérges	V	Csongrád	Mórahalmi	1,274	6785
Pusztamiske	V	Veszprém	Ajkai	487	8455
Pusztamonostor	V	Jász-Nagykun-Szolnok	Jászberényi	1,653	5125
Pusztaottlaka	V	Békés	Mezokovácsházi	448	5665
Pusztaradvány	V	Borsod-Abaúj-Zemplén	Encsi	216	3874
Pusztaszabolcs	V	Fejér	Adonyi	6,327	2490
Pusztaszemes	V	Somogy	Balatonföldvári	406	8619
Pusztaszentlászló	V	Zala	Zalaegerszegi	663	8896
Pusztaszer	V	Csongrád	Kisteleki	1,693	6769
Pusztavacs	V	Pest	Dabasi	1,530	2378
Pusztavám	V	Fejér	Móri	2,546	8066
Pusztazámor	V	Pest	Budaörsi	1,022	2039
Putnok	T	Borsod-Abaúj-Zemplén	Ózdi	7,618	3630
Püski	V	Gyor-Moson-Sopron	Mosonmagyaróvári	642	9235
Püspökhatvan	V	Pest	Váci	1,548	2682
Püspökladány	T	Hajdú-Bihar	Püspökladányi	16,039	4150
Püspökmolnári	V	Tolna	Vasvári	996	9776
Püspökszilágy	V	Pest	Váci	718	2166

== Notes ==
- Cities marked with * have several different post codes, the one here is only the most general one.
