= Lőrinte (genus) =

Hungarian clan name

Genus (gens) Lőrinte
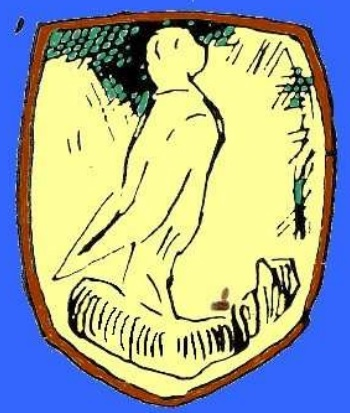
- Country: Kingdom of Hungary
- Founded: 12th century (?)
- Founder: Lőrinte
- Dissolution: 14th century
- Cadet branches: House of Essegvári; House of Csékúti; House of Bezerédj; House of Pacsai

Lőrinte or Lőrente (Leurente or Leurenthe) was the name of a gens (Latin for "clan"; nemzetség in Hungarian) in the Kingdom of Hungary, which possessed lands in Transdanubia, mainly Veszprém and Zala counties. The Essegvári and Bezerédj families descended from this clan.

== History ==
The namesake founder of the clan, Lőrinte (a name variant of Lawrence) possibly lived in the 12th century. The kindred centered around the village Lőrinte (present-day Lőrintepuszta, a borough of Kolontár) in Veszprém County. There, they also erected a church. According to historian Attila Zsoldos, the Lőrinte kindred came from a lower social status (castle warriors or royal servants), who elevated into the Hungarian nobility due to their services for the royal court.

Based on a 1478 seal of vice-ispán George Essegvári, heraldist József Csoma reconstructed the coat-of-arms of the Lőrinte kindred in his 1904 work: on the shield field a falcon facing left, standing on top of the palm of an outstretched arm.

The first known member of the kindred, Dedalus acted as pristaldus (bailiff) of Judge royal Julius Rátót in 1236, during a lawsuit between the nobles of Vigánt. The Judge royal instructed Dedalus to determine the borders of portions within the village in order to settle the conflict.

=== Essegvár branch ===
John (I) known only by name. His elder son Lőrinte (I) was born in the early 13th century. He married Margaret Sitkei, who originated from the powerful gens (clan) Ják. He died sometime before 1251. In that year, his brother Saul paid the dower to Lőrinte's widow and her second husband Ded Pok following a lawsuit before Zlaudus Ják, Bishop of Veszprém. Saul acted as a witness testifying in favor of the nuns of Veszprém Valley during a litigation in 1259. Together with his relative John, Saul was a member of that ten-member judiciary of Veszprém County in 1268, which supervised the complaints of nobles regarding illegal seizures of possessions by castle folks, udvornici and other conditional nobles in the spirit of the 1267 decree issued by Béla IV of Hungary. Saul bore the honorary title of comes since 1268. Saul functioned as an arbiter in a murder case between the residents of Gyulakeszi and Tóti in 1270. For his service, he was granted Halimba and Örs by Béla IV.

The kindred reached its peak with the career of Lőrinte (II), the only known son of Saul. During his unprecedented longevity among his contemporaries (he is said to have lived to be 100 years old), he served five Hungarian monarchs. He began his career in the court of Duke Stephen, Béla's eldest son. He was among the defenders of the Pressburg Castle (today Bratislava, Slovakia), when Ottokar II of Bohemia invaded Hungary in the spring of 1271. Lőrinte and his several familiares were captured. For his service and loyalty, Stephen V granted Erdőberénd (today Tósokberénd, a borough of Ajka), Gajdosbogdán and Bogdán (today both are boroughs of Noszlop) to him in Veszprém County in 1272. Lőrinte married an unidentified daughter of Mark Csák. Their marriage produced four sons: Nicholas, Thomas, John and Beke. Thomas was progenitor of the Essegvári (or Segvári) family, while the Csékútis descended from Beke. Lőrinte bore the title of magister since the 1290s. Under Andrew III of Hungary, he served as ispán of Veszprém County from 1291 to 1292 and from 1298.

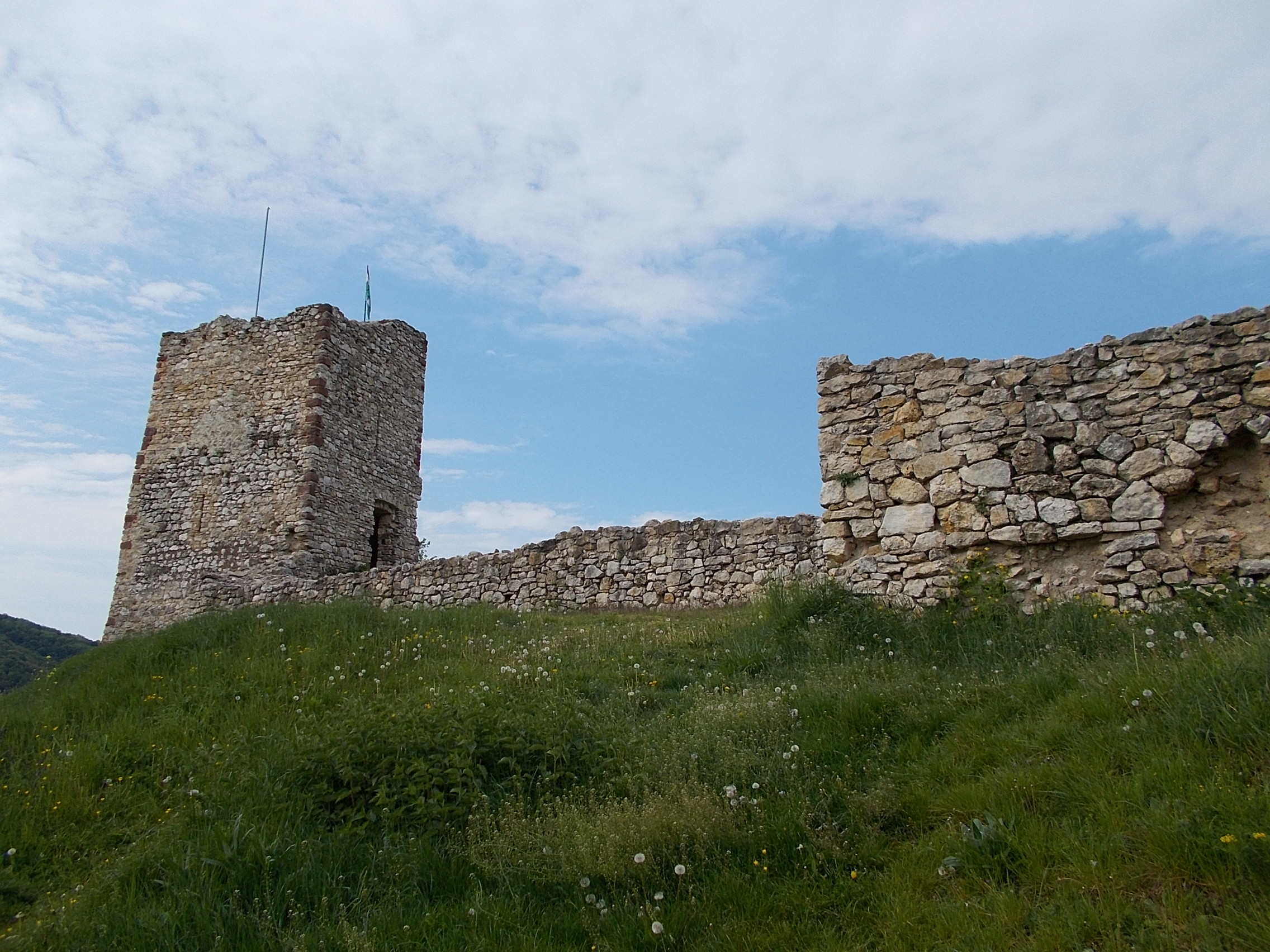
The ruins of Essegvár, seat of the Lőrinte kindred after 1309

In 1309, Nicholas Igmánd, who had no descendants, donated the castle Essegvár (or Segvár, laid in Bánd) to his "closest relatives" Lőrinte and his four sons. Nicholas stated they are, anyway, entitled to a daughters' quarter after all his inherited and acquired property, which implies that he was a possible son of Lőrinte's unidentified sister. With this contract, the Lőrintes also acquired the villages Bánd, Billege, Tótvázsony, Kismelked in Veszprém County, Igmánd in Komárom County and Zics in Somogy County along the right bank of Danube. Thereafter, Essegvár became the new seat of the Lőrinte clan, adopting the Essegvári (or Segvári) surname in the 14th century.

During the era of Interregnum, Lőrinte supported the claim of Charles I of Hungary. Similarly to the other lords of the region, this political position came up against the violent Kőszegi family, who extended their influence over whole Transdanubia in the 1300s. John Kőszegi besieged and occupied Essegvár from Lőrinte in 1314, as part of an extensive campaign in that year. Lőrinte was captured and severely tortured, when he was tied to a horse's tail and dragged along the castle wall. Although some historians wrote about Lőrinte's execution in this regard, he actually survived the ordeal. Charles I defeated the oligarchic provinces one after another, including the Kőszegis' territory. The Essegváris regained the castle of Essegvár within years, Thomas was referred to as owner of the fort already in early 1318. Lőrinte (II) lived at least until 1342, but now his sons – Thomas and Beke – took care of the family's daily affairs. They were involved many lawsuits (including against Nicholas Igmánd) and violent actions in the region. In 1319, the Essegváris possessed Gecse, Becse, Bánd, Szentgál, Németi, Szentistván, Billege, Tótvázsony, Csepel, Vöröstó, Lőrinte, Padrag (today a borough of Ajka), Csolta, Tósok, Gyepes and Csékút (the latter three are present-day boroughs of Ajka). Thomas, the ancestor of the Essegvári family, was killed in the Battle of Posada in 1330.

Family tree

- John I
  - Lőrinte I (d. before 1251) ∞ Margaret Sitkei
  - Saul (fl. 1251–1270)
    - Lőrinte II (fl. 1271–1342) ∞ N Csák
      - Nicholas (fl. 1302–1309)
      - Thomas (fl. 1309–1330†)
        - Essegvári (Segvári) family
      - John II (fl. 1309)
      - Beke (fl. 1309–1364)
        - Csékúti family

=== Pacsa branch ===
The earliest known member of this branch was Ant (or Onth). He held possessions near Endréd, in the region between Gyepes (now a borough of Ajka) and Noszlop in 1256. Ant married an unidentified daughter of Buzád (III) from the powerful gens (clan) Hahót, thereafter he moved to Zala County. Ant's kinship became familiares of the Hahót clan. His son John was granted the village Pacsa by his maternal uncle Atyusz Hahót in 1291, for his services and the fact of their kinship. The family lived there after that.

Following the death of Atyusz in the 1300s, John Pacsai became the guardian of his minor cousin John (the son of Atyusz and progenitor of the Szabari family). As a result, John Szabari donated Gelsesziget him after he reached adulthood. Stephen was the only known son of John Pacsai. He is first mentioned in 1326, when his father requested Charles I of Hungary to confirm his right of ownership over Pacsa.

Stephen entered court service at a young age. He served as vice-ispán of Zala County from 1350 to 1351. Thereafter, he administered Gerzence (Garešnica) County in Slavonia (1352) then Križevci County (1355). He was forced to defend his right of ownership over Pacsa during a lawsuit in 1358. He had no known descendants.

Family tree

- Ant (fl. 1256) ∞ N Hahót
  - John (fl. 1291–1326)
    - Stephen Pacsai (fl. 1326–1358)

=== Other members ===
Various individuals, who lived in Lőrinte and this is indicated ("de Leurente"), appear in contemporary records. Their belonging to the genus can only be assumed.

- An unidentified daughter of Joachim was the widow of Alexander Tófeji in 1259. She was granted 36 marks as her dower.
- Two of the familiares of Lőrinte (II), Lampert and John, who were killed during the siege of Pressburg in 1271, were referred to as belonging to the Lőrinte genus.
- According to a complaint, a runaway servant of the Ajkais took shelter in the house of the sons of Gabirian in 1274, bringing with him a horse and a full armor of war. Judge royal Nicholas Gutkeled ordered an investigation.
- Daniel and Merse, the sons of Leopardus sold their estate in Örs in 1279. Merse was still alive in 1318.
- Herbord, son of Lucas was a relative of the aforementioned Leopardus' sons and he was also a landowner in Örs in 1279.
- Stephen (II), the son of Stephen (I) acted as an arbiter in a lawsuit between Demetrius Rátót and the Diocese of Veszprém in 1300. Stephen bought a portion in Lőrinte for 4 marks from Csab (see below) in 1302. He married an unidentified lady from the gens (clan) Salamon. His son Ladislaus took another portion in the settlement as a pledge from the grandson of Mether in 1352.
- Csab, son of Vécs sold the aforementioned portion in Lőrinte to Stephen (II) in 1302, with the consent of his closest relatives Peter, James and Paul (I), the sons of Lawrence. Paul (II) was the son of Csab. He was entrusted to manage the possessions of Paul, son of Mether, who moved to Eger and worked as a merchant. Paul (II), however, managed poorly, he did not report its income to Paul and then to his widow, who then took back the land and pledged it to Ladislaus (see above) in 1352, in the name of his son.
- Gregory, son of John pledged his portion in Lőrinte to Csab sometime before 1302.
- Martin, son of Ákos acted as an oath taker beside the Essegváris in their lawsuit against the nuns of Veszprém Valley over the estate Padrag in 1342.
- Agnes, daughter of Denis was a nun at Veszprém Valley in 1346, when, during the litigation with the Essegváris, testified that Padrag belonged to the nunnery.

The Bezerédj (Bezerédi or Bezerédy) family, which first appears in contemporary records in 1327, also descended from the Lőrinte kinship, but their genealogical connection is unknown to the clan. Their ancient seat was Bezeréd in Zala County.

== Sources ==
- Engel, Pál (1996). Magyarország világi archontológiája, 1301–1457, I. [Secular Archontology of Hungary, 1301–1457, Volume I] (in Hungarian). História, MTA Történettudományi Intézete. ISBN 963-8312-44-0.
- Karácsonyi, János (1900). A magyar nemzetségek a XIV. század közepéig. [The Hungarian genera until the middle of the 14th century] (in Hungarian). Hungarian Academy of Sciences.
- Solymosi, László (1984). "Hospeskiváltság 1275-ből [A Hospes Privilege from 1275]". In Kredics, László (ed.). Tanulmányok Veszprém megye múltjából [Essays on the Past of Veszprém County] (in Hungarian). Veszprém Megyei Levéltár. pp. 17–100. ISBN 963-01-4537-5.
- Zsoldos, Attila (1998). "Közszabad nemzetségek [The Middle Privileged Clans]". Mediævalia Transilvanica. 2 (1): 43–60. ISSN 1453-8520.
- Zsoldos, Attila (1999). "Két hamis oklevélről [Two Fake Documents]". Történelmi Szemle (in Hungarian). 41 (1–2). Hungarian Academy of Sciences: 191–208. ISSN 0040-9634.
- Zsoldos, Attila (2011). Magyarország világi archontológiája, 1000–1301 [Secular Archontology of Hungary, 1000–1301] (in Hungarian). História, MTA Történettudományi Intézete. ISBN 978-963-9627-38-3.
