= Tótok =

Tót (plural: Tótok) (sometimes archaic spelling: Tóth or Tóthok) was a Hungarian exonym used to collectively refer to the Slavic-speaking populations in the Kingdom of Hungary, today identified as Slovaks, Slovenes and Slavonians (Croats of Slavonia). The erstwhile Hungarian name for Slavonia was Tótország (Land of the Tóts/Tóths) until the end of the 19th century.

In the 1604 lexicon by Albert Szenczi Molnár, "Tót" was defined as "Sclavus, Dalmata, Illyricus", a "Totorszag" (Tótsag) is "Dalmatia, Sclavonia, Illyrica, Illyricum" and "Totorszagi" language is "Dalmaticus", which themselves are also references to the Croats, Croatia and the Croatian language. The word became an umbrella term for Slavic-speaking peoples following Western Christian (mainly Roman Catholic) traditions living across the Kingdom of Hungary until the early 20th century (including the few Czech and Polish populations living in historical Hungary). In present-day Hungary, mainly Roman Catholic Tótok speaking South Slavic languages reside in areas west of the Danube (Transdanubia), while Tótok of Slovak origin with Catholic or Lutheran religion live in the areas east of the Danube (North Hungarian Mountains).

Beginning in the 20th century, the term "Tót" was gradually removed from official use, and the word that previously included several different Western Christian Slavic ethnic groups was limited to Slovaks in common parlance.

Several Hungarian settlements preserve the name Tót such as Tahitótfalu (originally Tahi and Tótfalu separately), Tótkomlós, Tótszentgyörgy, Tótszentmárton, Tótszerdahely, Tótújfalu, and Tótvázsony, Lengyeltóti and Káptalantóti.

The surname Tóth is currently the third most common surname in Hungary.
