= European route E653 =

Road in trans-European E-road network

E653

Route information
- Length: 107 km (66 mi)

Major junctions
- From: Letenye
- To: Maribor

Location
- Countries: Hungary, Slovenia

Highway system
- International E-road network; A Class; B Class

European route E 653 is a European B class road in Hungary and Slovenia, connecting the cities Letenye – Maribor.

== Itinerary ==
The E 653 routes through two European countries:

- Hungary
  - M70: Letenye ( E65 E71) - Tornyiszentmiklós
- Slovenia
  - A5: Pince - Murska Sobota - Maribor ( E57 E59)
