= Stephen Pacsai =

Hungarian nobleman

Vice-ispán of Zala
- Reign: 1350–1351
- Predecessor: John Isabori
- Successor: Bazsó Szentlászlói
- Died: after 1358
- Noble family: House of Pacsai
- Father: John Pacsai

Stephen Pacsai (Hungarian: Pacsai István; died after 1358), was a Hungarian nobleman in the 14th century, who held positions in Zala County and Slavonia.

== Family ==
Stephen Pacsai was born into a lesser branch of the gens (clan) Lőrinte, which possessed landholdings in Veszprém County. Stephen's grandfather Ant (or Onth) was a landowner near Endréd, in the region between Gyepes (now a borough of Ajka) and Noszlop in 1256. Ant married an unidentified daughter of Buzád (III) from the powerful gens (clan) Hahót, thereafter he moved to Zala County. Ant's kinship became familiares of the Hahót clan. His son John was granted the village Pacsa by his maternal uncle Atyusz Hahót in 1291, for his services and the fact of their kinship. The family lived there after that.

Following the death of Atyusz in the 1300s, John Pacsai became the guardian of his minor cousin John (the son of Atyusz and progenitor of the Szabari family). As a result, John Szabari donated Gelsesziget him after he reached adulthood. Stephen was the only known son of John Pacsai. He is first mentioned in 1326, when his father requested Charles I of Hungary to confirm his right of ownership over Pacsa.

== Career ==
Stephen Pacsai entered court service at a young age. During his first mention in 1326, he is referred to as a "royal youth" (or page), i.e. a juvenile member of the royal court.

Pacsai started his career as a familiaris of his relative Nicholas Hahót. Under his service, Pacsai served as vice-ispán of Zala County from 1350 to 1351. Thereafter, he entered the service of Stephen Lackfi, Ban of Croatia and Slavonia. In this capacity, he administered Gerzence (Garešnica) County in Slavonia in 1352. He was replaced by Thomas Szentjakabi, when Stephen of Anjou was appointed by King Louis I of Hungary to administer Croatia, Dalmatia and Slavonia in 1353. Under again Nicholas Hahót, who was made Ban of Slavonia, Pacsai was styled as ispán of Križevci County (Körös) in 1355.

Pacsai was an influential landowner in Zala County. He was a member of the local judicial court on several occasions, for instance in 1357, together with his relative Pető, son of Mark Pacsai. He acted as an officialis (bailiff) in Ászár on behalf of the king during a land agreement in 1358. In the same year, Palatine Nicholas Kont held a palatinal general assembly (Latin: generalis congregatio) for Zala County near Mándhida. There, a certain Lawrence Boksai and his paternal cousin John filed a lawsuit against Pacsai, claiming that the village Pacsa belongs to them. They cited a charter of Duke Stephen from the year 1260 as a proof, which contained that their ancestors, the castle warriors of Zala Castle (including Jonas and Vydus) were ennobled and granted the land Pacsa for their faithful military services by the duke. In contrast, Pacsai presented four documents to prove his right of ownership over the estate (the aforementioned acts from 1283 (two), 1291 and 1326).

Hungarian historiography declared the aforementioned 1260 charter as non-authentic, based on chronological contradictions with other contemporary documents in the text. However, the palatinal assembly failed to recognize the Boksais' document forgery. Nevertheless, Nicholas Kont ruled in favor of Stephen Pacsai, arguing that the late Duke Stephen had no right to grant land and nobility without the consent of the king (his father and future rival Béla IV of Hungary). With this argument, Kont neglected the fact that the dukes of the Árpád dynasty administered their territorial provinces with royal sovereignty. In addition, the plaintiffs could not prove that this donation would have received royal confirmation at any time later, while the defendant (Stephen Pacsai) proved his family's uninterrupted possession of Pacsa in the past decades.

Stephen Pacsai died sometime after 1358. He had no known descendants. It is plausible he was deceased by that time, when the Boksais (now called themselves "nobles from the kindred Jonas of Pacsa"; Latin: de genere Jonas dicti de Pacha) successfully acquired ownership over Pacsa in 1375, again presenting the duke's charter of 1260, a clearly forgery.

== Sources ==
- Engel, Pál (1996). Magyarország világi archontológiája, 1301–1457, I. [Secular Archontology of Hungary, 1301–1457, Volume I] (in Hungarian). História, MTA Történettudományi Intézete. ISBN 963-8312-44-0.
- Karácsonyi, János (1900). A magyar nemzetségek a XIV. század közepéig. [The Hungarian genera until the middle of the 14th century] (in Hungarian). Hungarian Academy of Sciences.
- Zsoldos, Attila (1999). "Két hamis oklevélről [Two Fake Documents]". Történelmi Szemle (in Hungarian). 41 (1–2). Hungarian Academy of Sciences: 191–208. ISSN 0040-9634.
