= Kerkaszentkirály =

Kerkaszentkirály Kralevec (in Croatian)
- Village
- Flag Coat of arms

- Location of Kerkaszentkirály
- Coordinates: 46.49465°N 16.57461°E
- Country: Hungary
- Region: Western Transdanubia
- County: Zala
- District: Letenye

Area
  - Total: 8.11 km^{2} (3.13 sq mi)

Population (1 January 2025)
  - Total: 181
  - Density: 22.3/km^{2} (57.8/sq mi)
- Time zone: UTC+1 (CET)
  - Summer (DST): UTC+2 (CEST)
- Postal code: 8874
- Area code: (+36) 92
- Motorways: M70
- Distance from Budapest: 248 km (154 mi) Northeast
- Website: www.kerkaszentkiraly.hu

Kerkaszentkirály is a village in Zala County, Hungary.

The village is part of the Letenye subregion. In the 2001 census, it had a population of 284, with 98.6% of the population identifying themselves as Hungarians.
