= Csaba Lovkó =

Hungarian politician

Member of the National Assembly
- Incumbent
- Assumed office 9 May 2026
- Preceded by: Péter Cseresnyés
- Constituency: Zala 3rd

Personal details
- Party: Tisza

Csaba Lovkó is a Hungarian politician who was elected member of the National Assembly in 2026 representing the Zala County 3rd constituency. He previously worked as a senior purchasing manager.
