= Lispeszentadorján =

Lispeszentadorján Lupša / Vudrijan (in Croatian)
- Village
- Flag Coat of arms

- Location of Lispeszentadorján
- Coordinates: 46.53955°N 16.69219°E
- Country: Hungary
- Region: Western Transdanubia
- County: Zala
- District: Letenye

Area
  - Total: 9.14 km^{2} (3.53 sq mi)

Population (1 January 2026)
  - Total: 244
  - Density: 26.7/km^{2} (69.1/sq mi)
- Time zone: UTC+1 (CET)
  - Summer (DST): UTC+2 (CEST)
- Postal code: 8888
- Area code: (+36) 93
- Website: lispeszentadorjan.hu

Lispeszentadorján (Croatian: Lupša i Vudrijan) is a village of 334 people (2005 population) in Hungary. It lies in the southern part of the Zala hills, close to the Slovenian and Croatian borders. The distance to Budapest is approx. 254 km (158 mi) by car.

== History ==
Lispeszentadorján was created in 1937 by the union of three villages: Lispe, Szentadorján and Erdőhát. It has one of the oldest written records in Hungary: in 1024 Stephen I of Hungary donated the village to the monastery of Zalavár. The most important event in the history of this small village was the discovery of the oil fields and the opening of the first industrial oil well in Hungary in 1937.

== Tourist sites ==
- Roman Catholic church (Neo-Romanesque)
- Ruins of a monastery in the cemetery (16th century)
- The vine-cellars on the hilltop between Szentadorján and Maróc.
