= Bánokszentgyörgy =

- Village
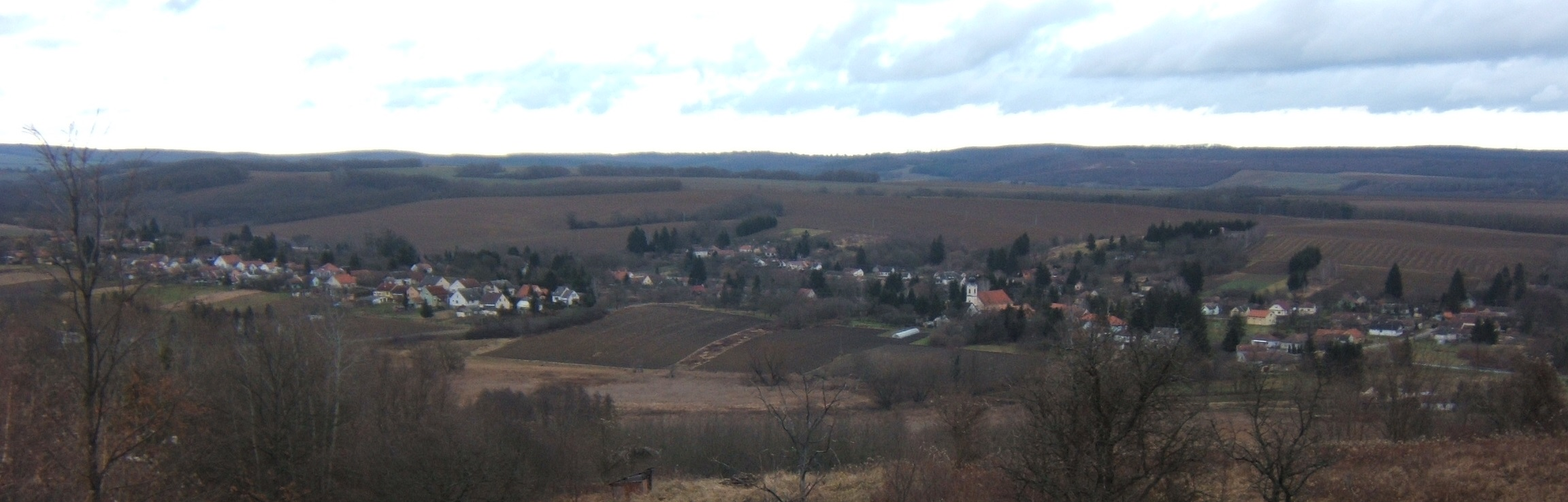

- Flag Coat of arms

- Location of Bánokszentgyörgy
- Coordinates: 46°33′N 16°47′E
- Country: Hungary
- Region: Western Transdanubia
- County: Zala
- District: Letenye

Area
  - Total: 32.54 km^{2} (12.56 sq mi)

Population (1 January 2025)
  - Total: 541
  - Density: 16.6/km^{2} (43.1/sq mi)
- Time zone: UTC+1 (CET)
  - Summer (DST): UTC+2 (CEST)
- Postal code: 8891
- Area code: (+36) 93
- Website: banokszentgyorgy.hu

Bánokszentgyörgy is a village in Zala County, Hungary.
