= Csörnyeföld =

- Village
- Flag Coat of arms

- Location of Csörnyeföld
- Coordinates: 46°30′N 16°38′E
- Country: Hungary
- Region: Western Transdanubia
- County: Zala
- District: Letenye

Area
  - Total: 21.34 km^{2} (8.24 sq mi)

Population (1 January 2025)
  - Total: 349
  - Density: 16.4/km^{2} (42.4/sq mi)
- Time zone: UTC+1 (CET)
  - Summer (DST): UTC+2 (CEST)
- Postal code: 8873
- Area code: (+36) 93
- Motorways: M70
- Distance from Budapest: 246 km (153 mi) Northeast
- Website: csornyefold.hu

Csörnyeföld is a village in Zala County, Hungary.
