= Zajk =

Zajk Sajka (in Croatian)
- Village
- Flag Coat of arms

- Location of Zajk
- Coordinates: 46.48277°N 16.72031°E
- Country: Hungary
- Region: Western Transdanubia
- County: Zala
- District: Letenye

Area
  - Total: 12.39 km^{2} (4.78 sq mi)

Population (1 January 2026)
  - Total: 197
  - Density: 15.9/km^{2} (41.2/sq mi)
- Time zone: UTC+1 (CET)
  - Summer (DST): UTC+2 (CEST)
- Postal code: 8868
- Area code: (+36) 93
- Website: zajk.extra.hu

Zajk (Croatian: Sajka) is a village in Zala County, Hungary. It is known for its cheese.
