= Semjénháza =

Semjénháza Pustara (in Croatian)
- Village
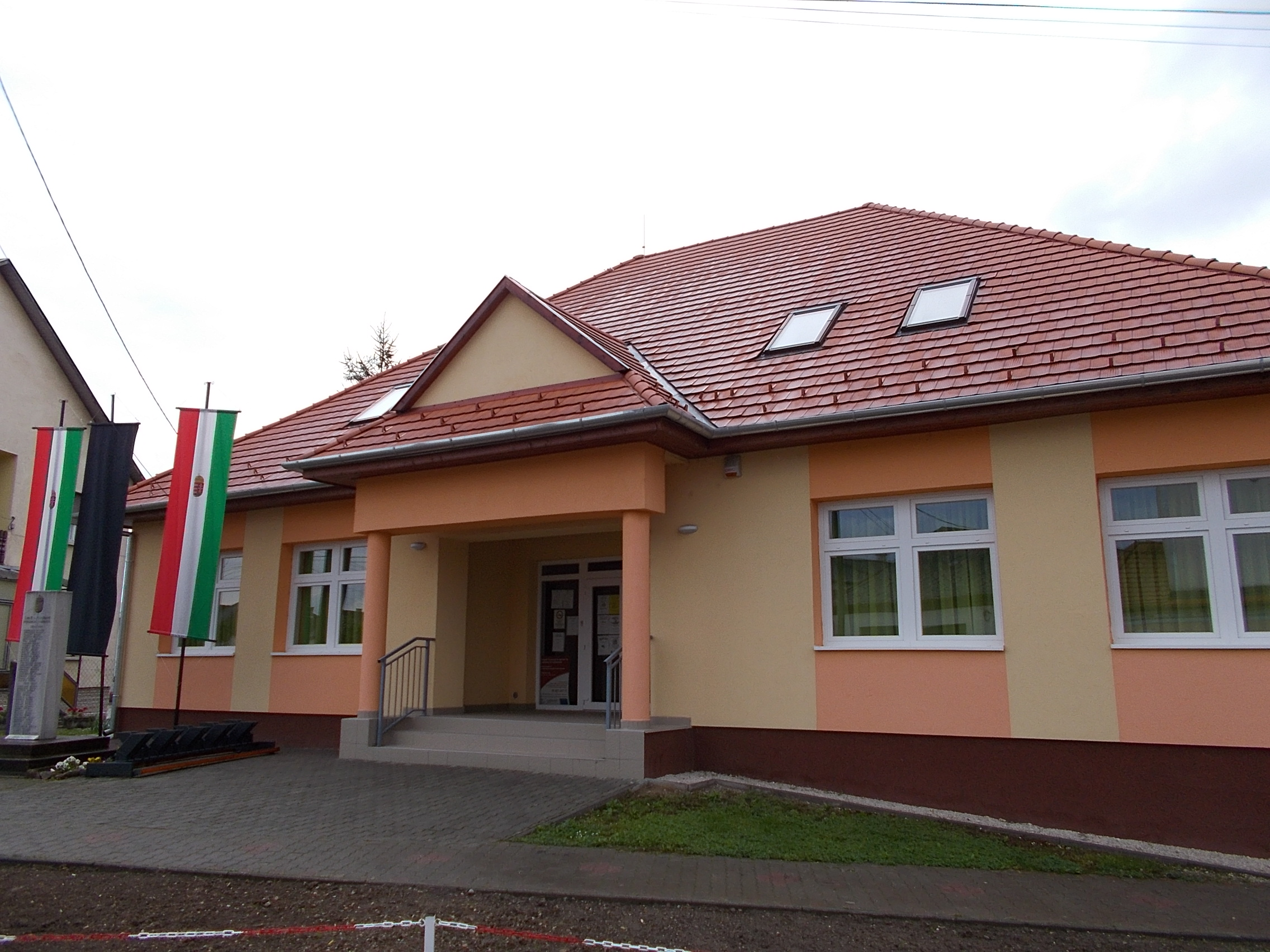
- Village hall

- Flag Coat of arms

- Location of Semjénháza
- Coordinates: 46.39762°N 16.84631°E
- Country: Hungary
- Region: Western Transdanubia
- County: Zala
- District: Letenye

Area
  - Total: 4.7 km^{2} (1.8 sq mi)

Population (1 January 2026)
  - Total: 503
  - Density: 110/km^{2} (280/sq mi)
- Time zone: UTC+1 (CET)
  - Summer (DST): UTC+2 (CEST)
- Postal code: 8862
- Area code: (+36) 93
- Website: semjenhaza.hu

Semjénháza is a village in Zala County, Hungary.
