= Bázakerettye =

- Village
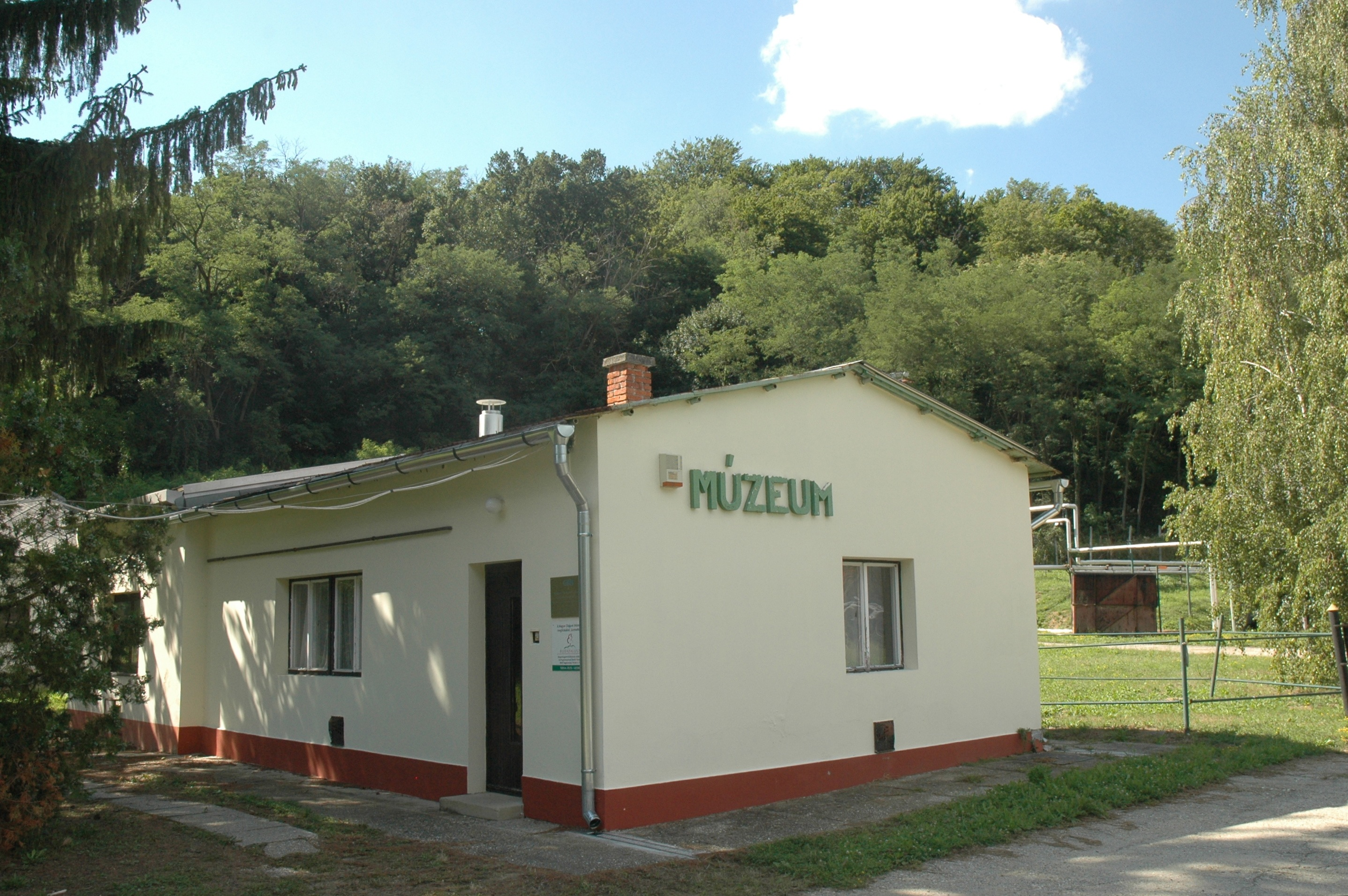

- Flag Coat of arms

- Location of Bázakerettye
- Coordinates: 46°31′N 16°44′E
- Country: Hungary
- Region: Western Transdanubia
- County: Zala
- District: Letenye

Area
  - Total: 8.03 km^{2} (3.10 sq mi)

Population (1 January 2025)
  - Total: 709
  - Density: 88.3/km^{2} (229/sq mi)
- Time zone: UTC+1 (CET)
  - Summer (DST): UTC+2 (CEST)
- Postal code: 8887
- Area code: (+36) 93
- Website: bazakerettye.hu

Bázakerettye is a village in Zala County, Hungary.
