= Pötréte =

Coordinates: 46°41′N 16°57′E

- Village
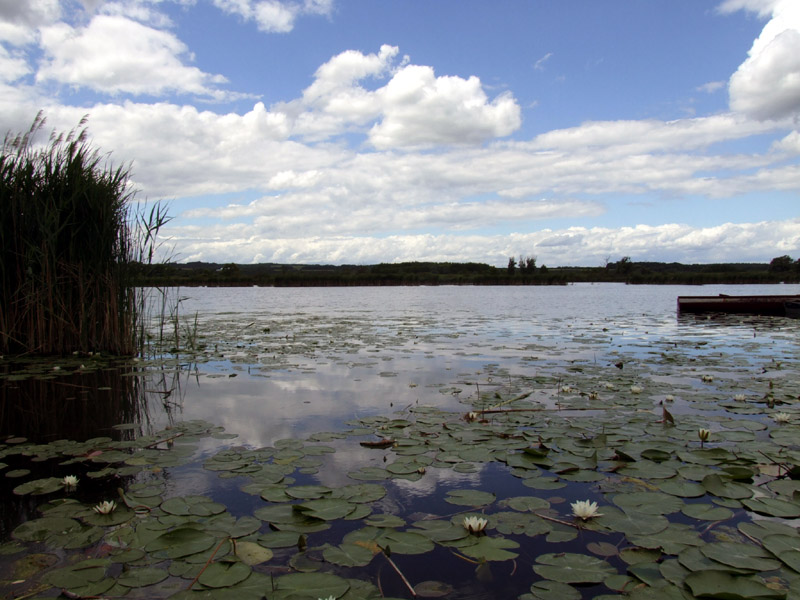
- Potretei horgaszto
- Interactive map of Pötréte
- Country: Hungary
- Region: Western Transdanubia
- County: Zala County
- Time zone: UTC+1 (CET)
  - Summer (DST): UTC+2 (CEST)

Pötréte is a village in Zala County, Hungary.
