= Pula, Hungary =

Pula
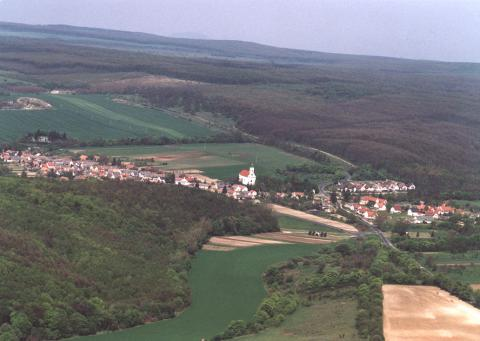
- Aerial photography of Pula

- Flag Coat of arms

- Location of Veszprém county in Hungary

- Location of Pula, Hungary
- Coordinates: 46.99717°N 17.64571°E
- Country: Hungary
- County: Veszprém

Area
  - Total: 14.64 km^{2} (5.65 sq mi)

Population (2004)
  - Total: 230
  - Density: 15.71/km^{2} (40.7/sq mi)
- Time zone: UTC+1 (CET)
  - Summer (DST): UTC+2 (CEST)
- Postal code: 8291
- Area code: 88

Pula is a village in Veszprém county, Hungary.
