= M70 motorway (Hungary) =

Road in Hungary

M70 motorway
- M70-es autópálya
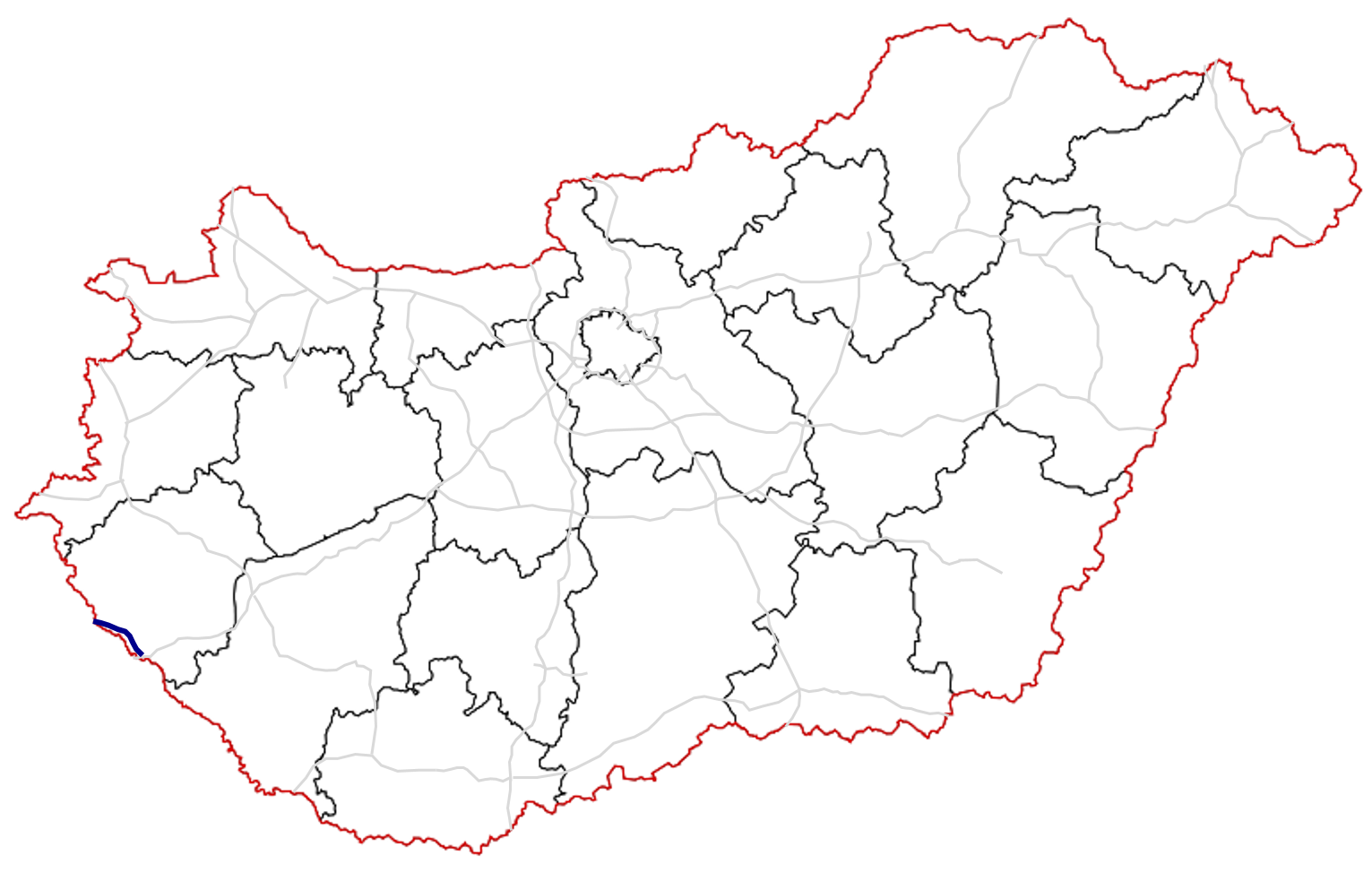
- in use other highways

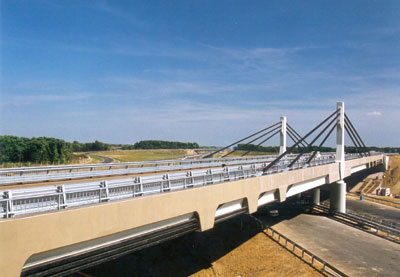
- Korongi Bridge in M70

Route information
- Part of E653
- Length: 21 km (13 mi)

Major junctions
- From: M7 near Letenye
- To: border with Slovenia → A5

Location
- Country: Hungary
- Counties: Zala

Highway system
- Roads in Hungary; Highways; Main roads; Local roads

The M70 motorway (Hungarian: M70-es autópálya) is a motorway in Hungary, connecting the M7 motorway to the A5 motorway in Slovenia. The road is 21 km long and has a speed limit of 130 km/h. The last section was completed in 2006. After the opening of the last missing sections of the M7 on August 19, 2008, there is a direct motorway link from Budapest to Slovenia. The expressway originally consisted of two lanes between Letenye and Tornyiszentmiklós interchanges. As a four-lane, full profile motorway, it opened on December 13, 2019 (see the Hungarian article for references in Hungarian). It was built by the Colas Group.

== Timeline ==
Section	Length	Opened	Notes
Letenye (M1) – Tornyiszentmiklós	18.6 km (11.56 mi)	Single carriageway: November 2004; Second carriageway: 13 December 2019	
Tornyiszentmiklós to the border	2.0 km (1.24 mi)	Autumn of 2005	Fully motorway

== Route description ==
- The route is full length motorway. The maximum speed limit is 130km/h, with (2x2 lane road with stop lane).

County	km	Type	Destination	Notes
Zala	0	Interchange	M7 / E65 / E71 – Budapest, Nagykanizsa M7 / E65 / E71 – Letenye → Zagreb (HR)	The southern terminus of the motorway, and E653 route. Kilometrage starting point trumpet interchange
Zala	1	Bridge	Korongi híd	Length: 115.6 m híd means Bridge
Zala	2	Exit	Main road 7 – Letenye, Zagreb (HR) / Budapest	
Zala	11	Exit	Csörnyeföld, Murarátka / Muraszemenye	Connecting to M70 Autohof
Zala	15	Rest area	Csörnyeföldi pihenőhely	parking, WC, and water pihenőhely means Rest area
Zala		Bridge	Kerka híd	
Zala	18	Exit	Lenti, Tornyiszentmiklós	
Zala	20	Rest area	Tornyiszentmiklósi pihenőhely	
Zala	21	Border crossing within the EU	Tornyiszentmiklós (H) – Pince (SLO) border crossing A5 / E653 – Maribor towards to Ljubljana	Tornyiszentmiklós border crossing to Slovenia → A5 motorway. The northern terminus of the motorway, and E653 concurrency.
1.000 mi = 1.609 km; 1.000 km = 0.621 mi: Concurrency terminus; Incomplete access; Unopened

== Maintenance ==
The operation and maintenance of the road by Hungarian Concession Infrastructure Development Plc. This activity is provided by this highway engineer.

- near Eszteregnye (M7), kilometre trench 219

== Payment ==
Since 2015, the M70 motorway is fully tolled road. Hungarian system has 2 main type in terms of salary:

1, time-based fee vignettes (E-matrica);

- Cars, vans and motorbikes up to 3.5 tonnes only need to buy a single vignette which costs 6,400 Hungarian forint (Ft) for 10 days, 10,360 Ft for 1 month and 57,260 Ft for a year, from 1 January 2024.

2, county vignettes (vármegyei matrica); the highway can be used instead of the national sticker with the following county stickers:

Type of county vignette	Available section
Zala	full length (0 km – 21 km)

== European route(s) ==
Name	Route
	21 km	Letenye (0) – (Slovenia) Avtocesta A5

== Significant structures ==
Bridge

- Korongi Bridge (Korongi híd; 115.6 m or 379 ft) over the M7 motorway

== See also ==
- Roads in Hungary
- Transport in Hungary
- International E-road network
