= Palotás =

Palotás is a surname of Hungarian origin. Notable people with the surname include:

- Péter Palotás (1929–1967), Hungarian football player
- István Palotás (1908–?), Hungarian football player
- József Palotás (1911–1957), Hungarian wrestler

Palotás is the name of a Hungarian settlement:

- Palotás, Hungary
