= Muraszemenye =

Muraszemenye Semenince (in Croatian)
- Village
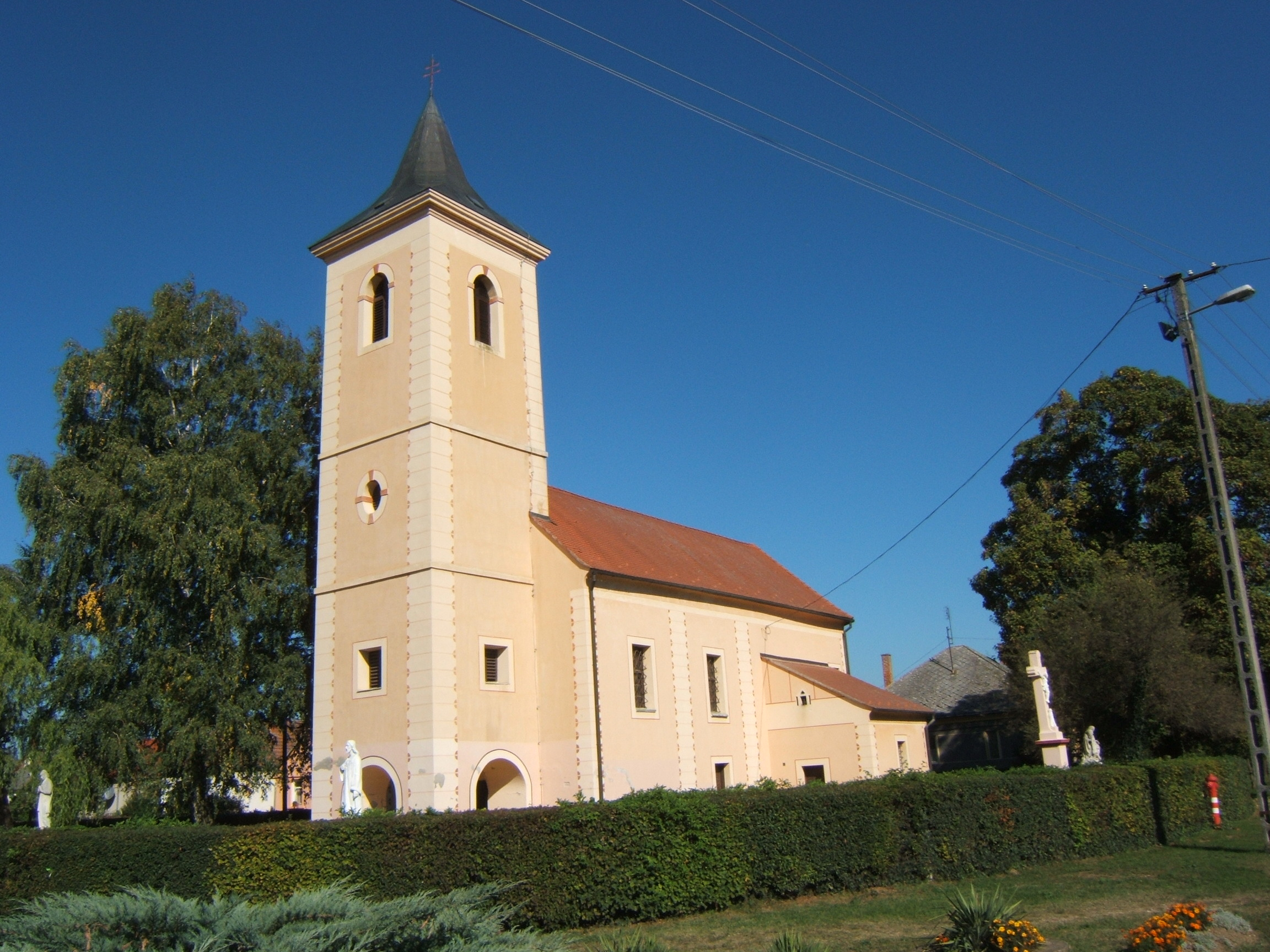

- Flag Coat of arms

- Location of Muraszemenye
- Coordinates: 46.4812°N 16.65315°E
- Country: Hungary
- Region: Western Transdanubia
- County: Zala
- District: Letenye

Area
  - Total: 16.05 km^{2} (6.20 sq mi)

Population (1 January 2025)
  - Total: 486
  - Density: 30.3/km^{2} (78.4/sq mi)
- Time zone: UTC+1 (CET)
  - Summer (DST): UTC+2 (CEST)
- Postal code: 8872
- Area code: (+36) 93
- Motorways: M70
- Distance from Budapest: 244 km (152 mi) Northeast
- Website: www.muraszemenye.hu

Muraszemenye (Croatian: Semenince) is a village in Zala County, Hungary.
