= Molnári =

Molnári Mlinarci / Mlinarce (in Croatian)
- Village
- Flag Coat of arms

- Location of Molnári
- Coordinates: 46.38521°N 16.8305°E
- Country: Hungary
- Region: Western Transdanubia
- County: Zala
- District: Letenye

Area
  - Total: 12.86 km^{2} (4.97 sq mi)

Population (1 January 2026)
  - Total: 594
  - Density: 46.2/km^{2} (120/sq mi)
- Time zone: UTC+1 (CET)
  - Summer (DST): UTC+2 (CEST)
- Postal code: 8863
- Area code: (+36) 93
- Website: www.molnari.hu

Molnári is a village in Zala County, Hungary.
