= Borsfa =

Borsfa Borša (in Croatian)
- Village
- Flag Coat of arms

- Location of Borsfa
- Coordinates: 46.50938°N 16.77980°E
- Country: Hungary
- Region: Western Transdanubia
- County: Zala
- District: Letenye

Area
  - Total: 11.83 km^{2} (4.57 sq mi)

Population (1 January 2025)
  - Total: 659
  - Density: 55.7/km^{2} (144/sq mi)
- Time zone: UTC+1 (CET)
  - Summer (DST): UTC+2 (CEST)
- Postal code: 8885
- Area code: (+36) 93
- Website: borsfa.hu

Borsfa (Croatian: Borša) is a village in Zala County, Hungary.
