= Szentmargitfalva =

Coordinates: 46°30′N 16°40′E

- Village
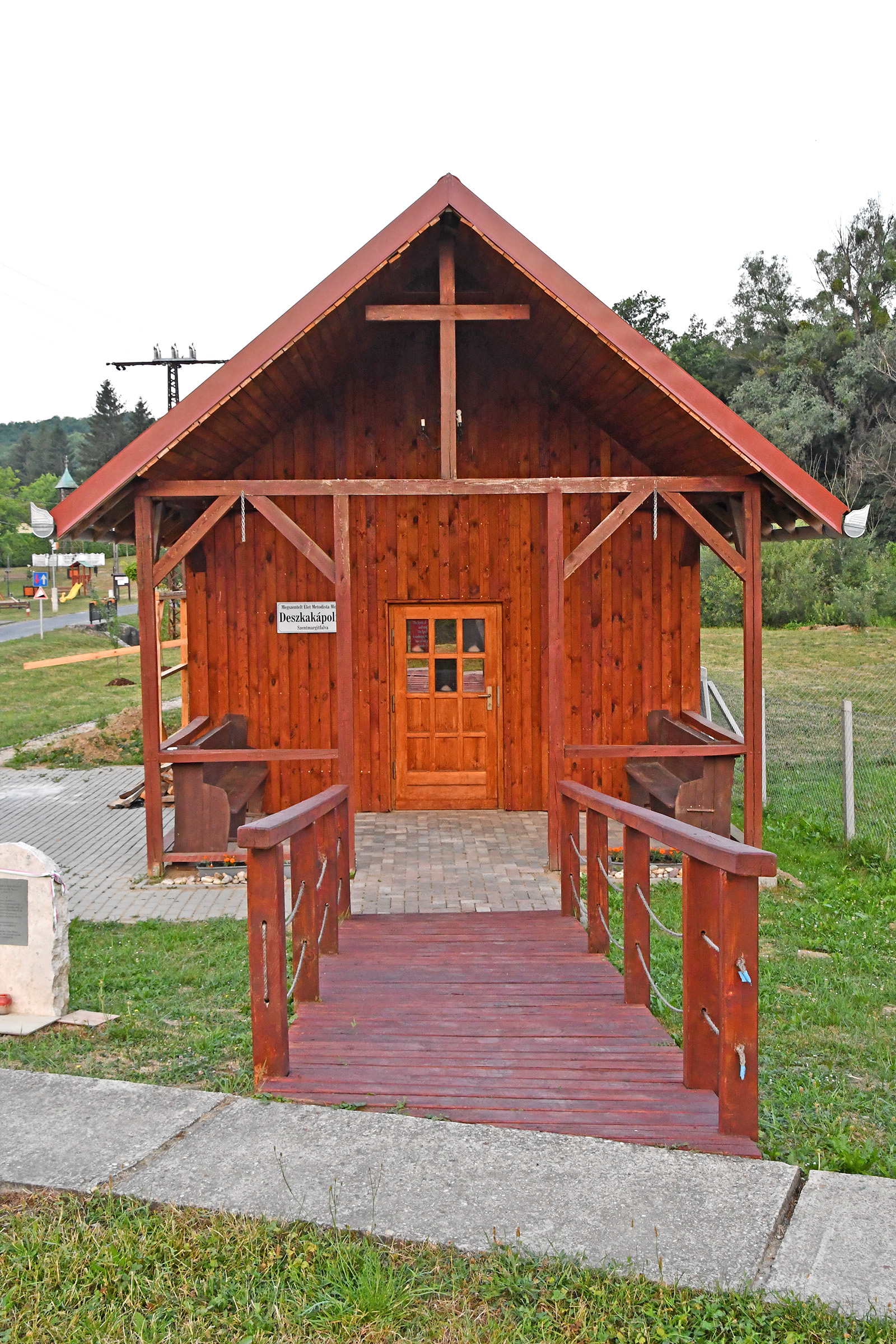
- Szentmargitfalva, metodista Deszkatemplom
- Interactive map of Szentmargitfalva
- Country: Hungary
- Region: Western Transdanubia
- County: Zala County
- Time zone: UTC+1 (CET)
  - Summer (DST): UTC+2 (CEST)
- Motorways: M70
- Distance from Budapest: 245 km (152 mi) Northeast

Szentmargitfalva is a village in Zala County, Hungary.
