= Porpác =

- Coat of arms

- Location of Porpác in Hungary
- Coordinates: 47.24190°N 16.80217°E
- Country: Hungary
- Region: Western Transdanubia
- County: Vas
- Subregion: Sárvári
- Rank: Village

Area
  - Total: 6.19 km^{2} (2.39 sq mi)

Population (1 January 2008)
  - Total: 166
  - Density: 26.8/km^{2} (69.5/sq mi)
- Time zone: UTC+1 (CET)
  - Summer (DST): UTC+2 (CEST)
- Postal code: 9612
- Area code: +36 95
- KSH code: 29896
- Website: http://www.porpac.hu/

Porpác is a village in Vas county, Hungary.

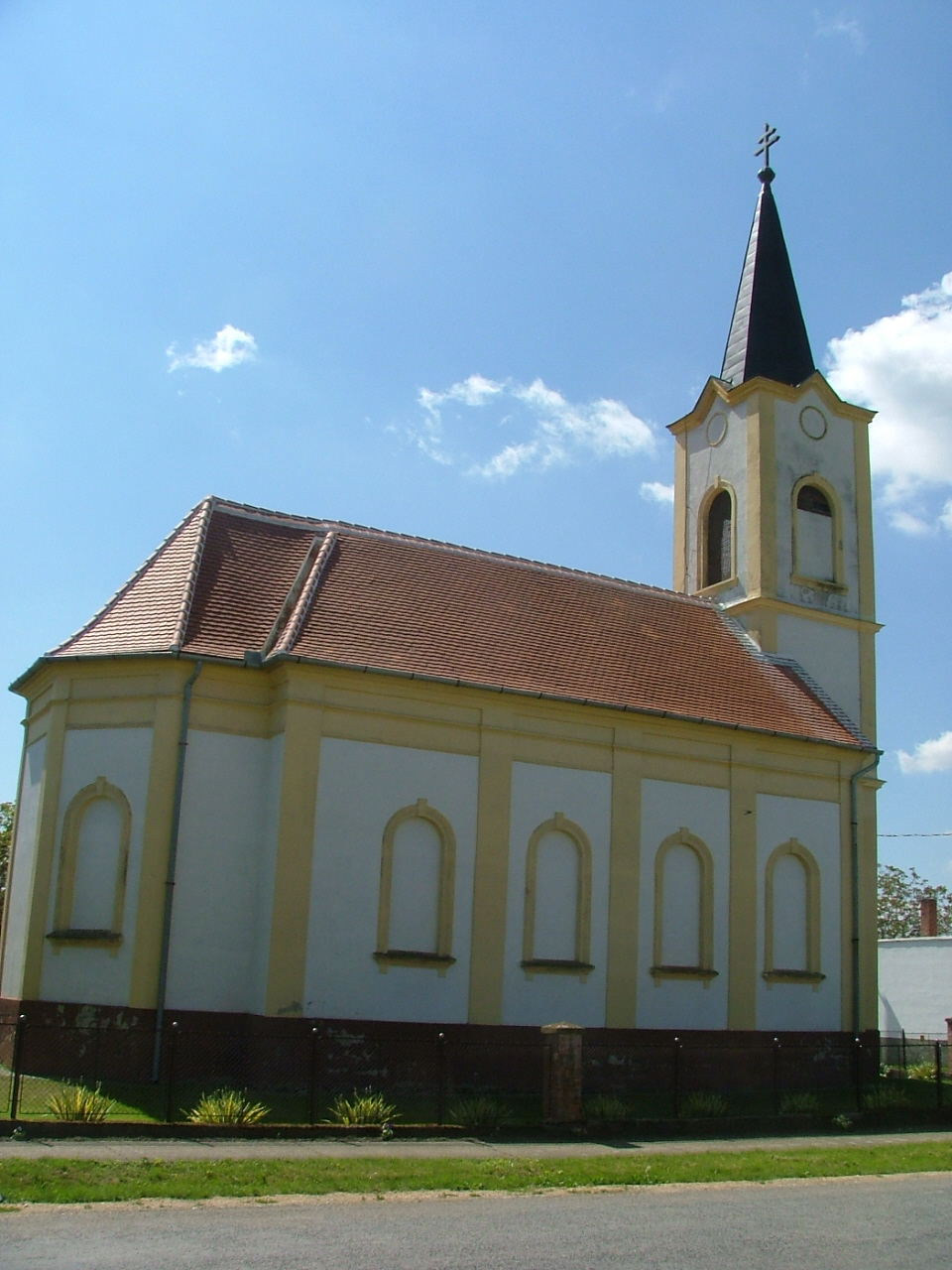
Church
