= Kistolmacs =

Village in Hungary

Coordinates: 46°29′N 16°45′E

Kistolmacs is a resort village in Zala County, Hungary (Croatian: Tulmač).

The village had 149 inhabitants as of 2025.

The village is located in a wooded valley. There is a lake with a beach: The lake is regularly stocked with fish. The village has snack bars and a restaurant. A supermarket is located nearby A narrow gauge railway network, connects Kistolmacs to neighbouring villages.
