= Petrivente =

Petrivente Petriba (in Croatian)
- Village
- Flag Coat of arms

- Location of Petrivente
- Coordinates: 46.43930°N 16.84043°E
- Country: Hungary
- Region: Western Transdanubia
- County: Zala
- District: Letenye

Area
  - Total: 7.65 km^{2} (2.95 sq mi)

Population (1 January 2025)
  - Total: 302
  - Density: 39.5/km^{2} (102/sq mi)
- Time zone: UTC+1 (CET)
  - Summer (DST): UTC+2 (CEST)
- Postal code: 8866
- Area code: (+36) 93
- Motorways: M7
- Distance from Budapest: 224 km (139 mi) Northeast
- Website: www.petrivente.hu

Petrivente (Croatian: Petriba) is a village in Zala County, Hungary.
