= Kiscsehi =

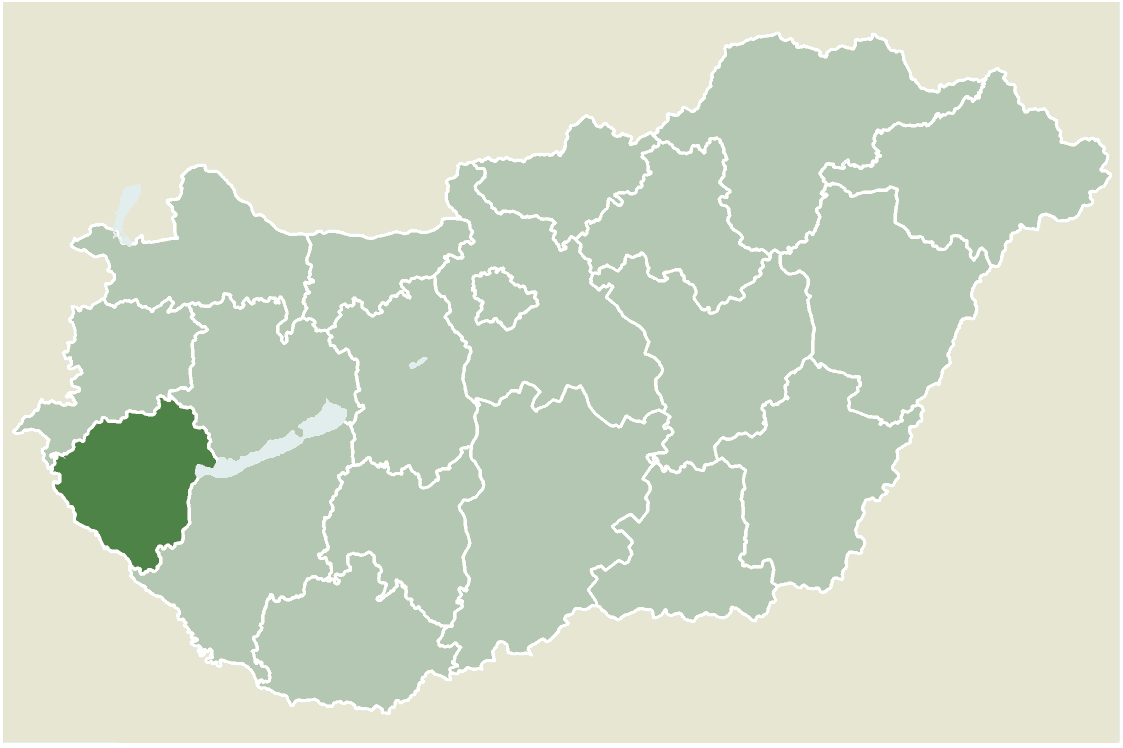
- Location of Zala county in Hungary

- Location of Kiscsehi
- Coordinates: 46.52038°N 16.67355°E
- Country: Hungary
- County: Zala

Area
  - Total: 11.43 km^{2} (4.41 sq mi)

Population (2004)
  - Total: 210
  - Density: 18.37/km^{2} (47.6/sq mi)
- Time zone: UTC+1 (CET)
  - Summer (DST): UTC+2 (CEST)
- Postal code: 8888
- Area code: 93

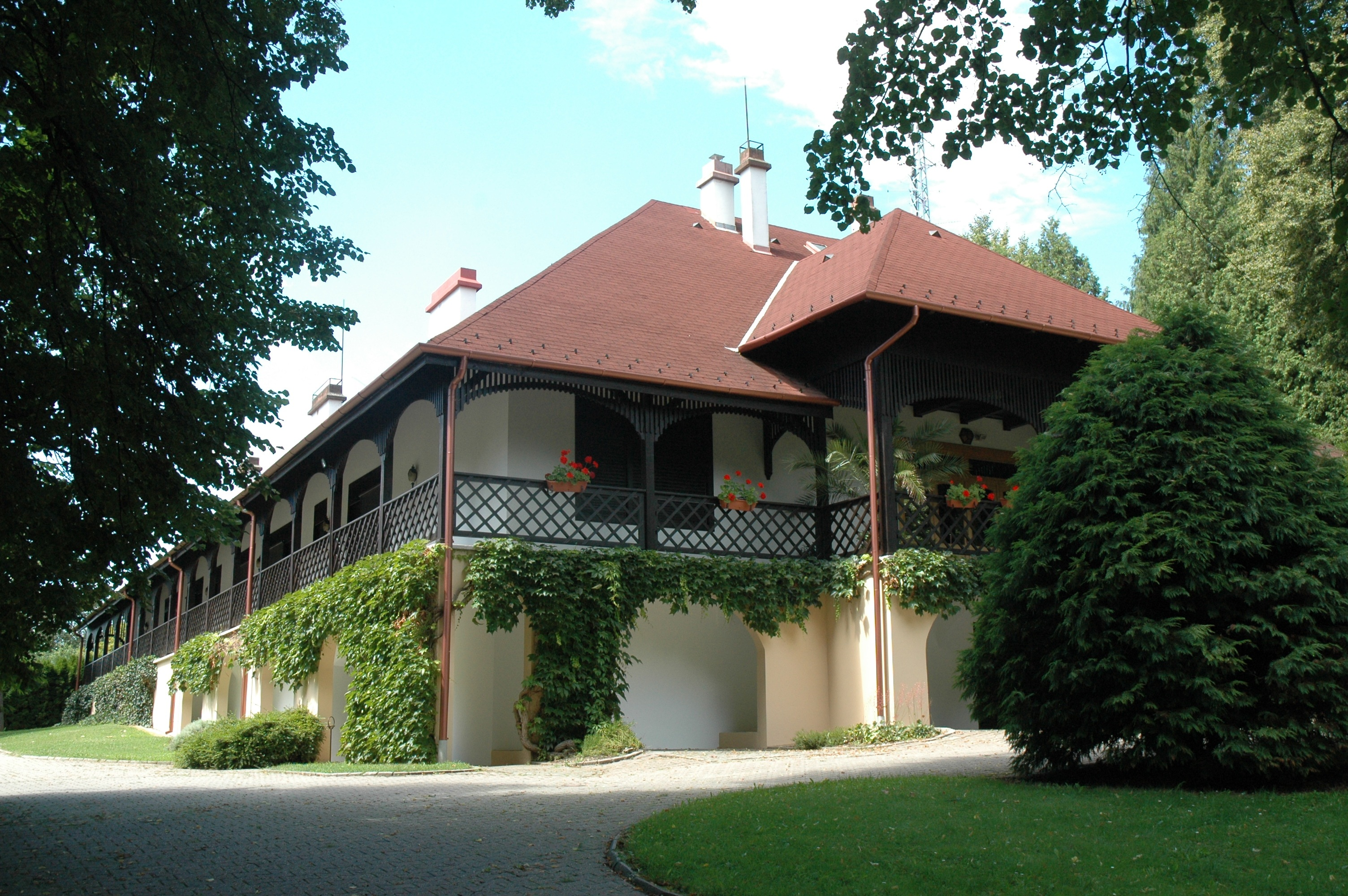
The Zichy hunting mansion in Budafapuszta, Zala County

Kiscsehi (Croatian: Čejiba) is a village in Zala County, Hungary.
