= Várfölde =

Coordinates: 46°34′N 16°46′E

- Village
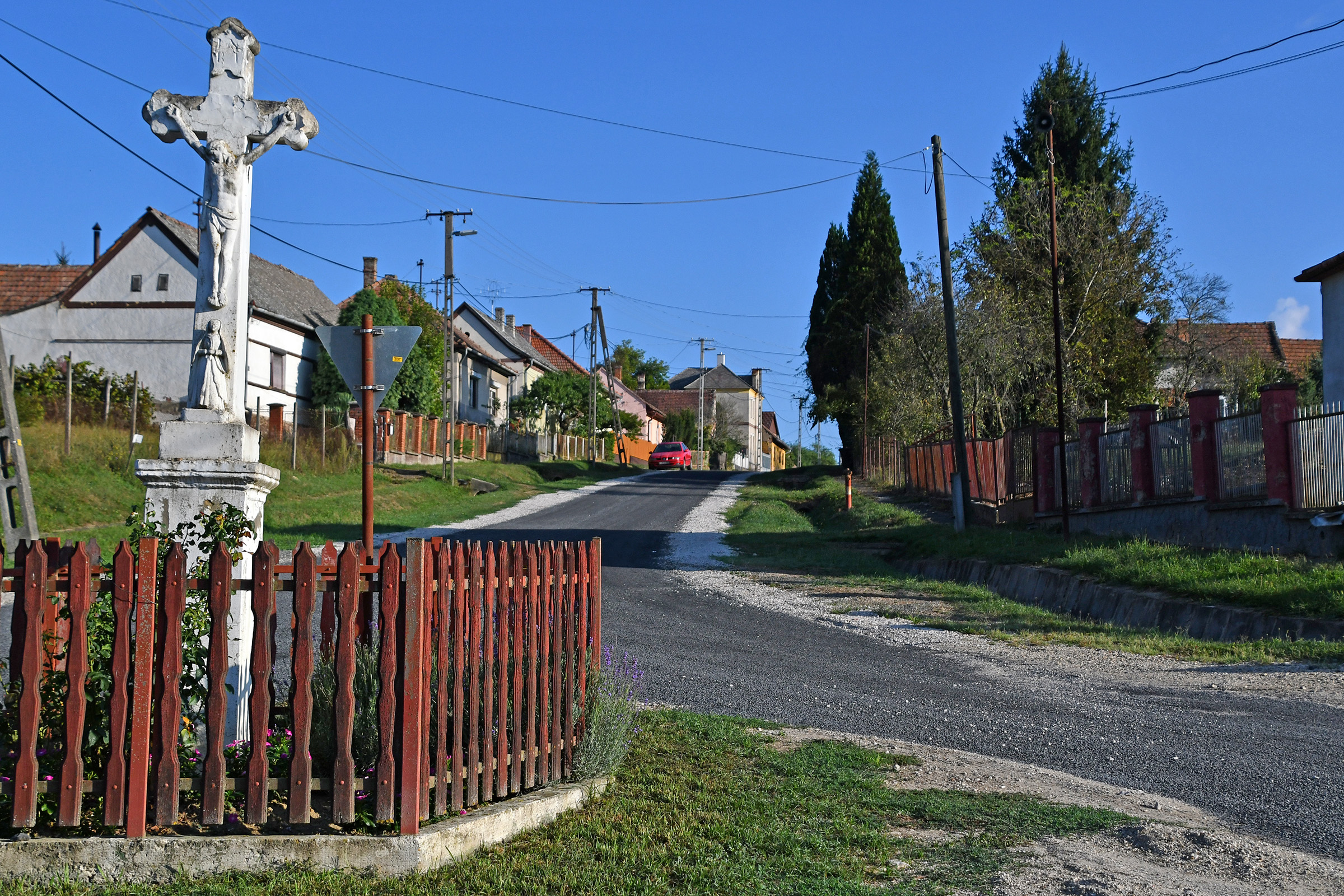
- The main street
- Interactive map of Várfölde
- Country: Hungary
- Region: Western Transdanubia
- County: Zala County
- Time zone: UTC+1 (CET)
  - Summer (DST): UTC+2 (CEST)

Várfölde is a village in Zala County, Hungary.
