= Murarátka =

- Village
- Flag Coat of arms

- Location of Murarátka
- Coordinates: 46.45656°N 16.67451°E
- Country: Hungary
- Region: Western Transdanubia
- County: Zala
- District: Letenye

Area
  - Total: 12.04 km^{2} (4.65 sq mi)

Population (1 January 2026)
  - Total: 227
  - Density: 18.9/km^{2} (48.8/sq mi)
- Time zone: UTC+1 (CET)
  - Summer (DST): UTC+2 (CEST)
- Postal code: 8868
- Area code: (+36) 93

Murarátka is a village in Zala County, Hungary.
