= Tótszerdahely =

Tótszerdahely Serdahelj
- Village
- Flag Coat of arms

- Location of Tótszerdahely
- Coordinates: 46.4°N 16.8°E
- Country: Hungary
- Region: Western Transdanubia
- County: Zala
- District: Letenye

Area
  - Total: 12.3 km^{2} (4.7 sq mi)

Population (1 January 2026)
  - Total: 1,037
  - Density: 84.3/km^{2} (218/sq mi)
- Time zone: UTC+1 (CET)
  - Summer (DST): UTC+2 (CEST)
- Postal code: 8864
- Area code: (+36) 93
- Website: totszerdahely.hu

Tótszerdahely (Croatian: Serdahelj, Serdahel) is a village in Zala County, Hungary.
