= Bucsuta =

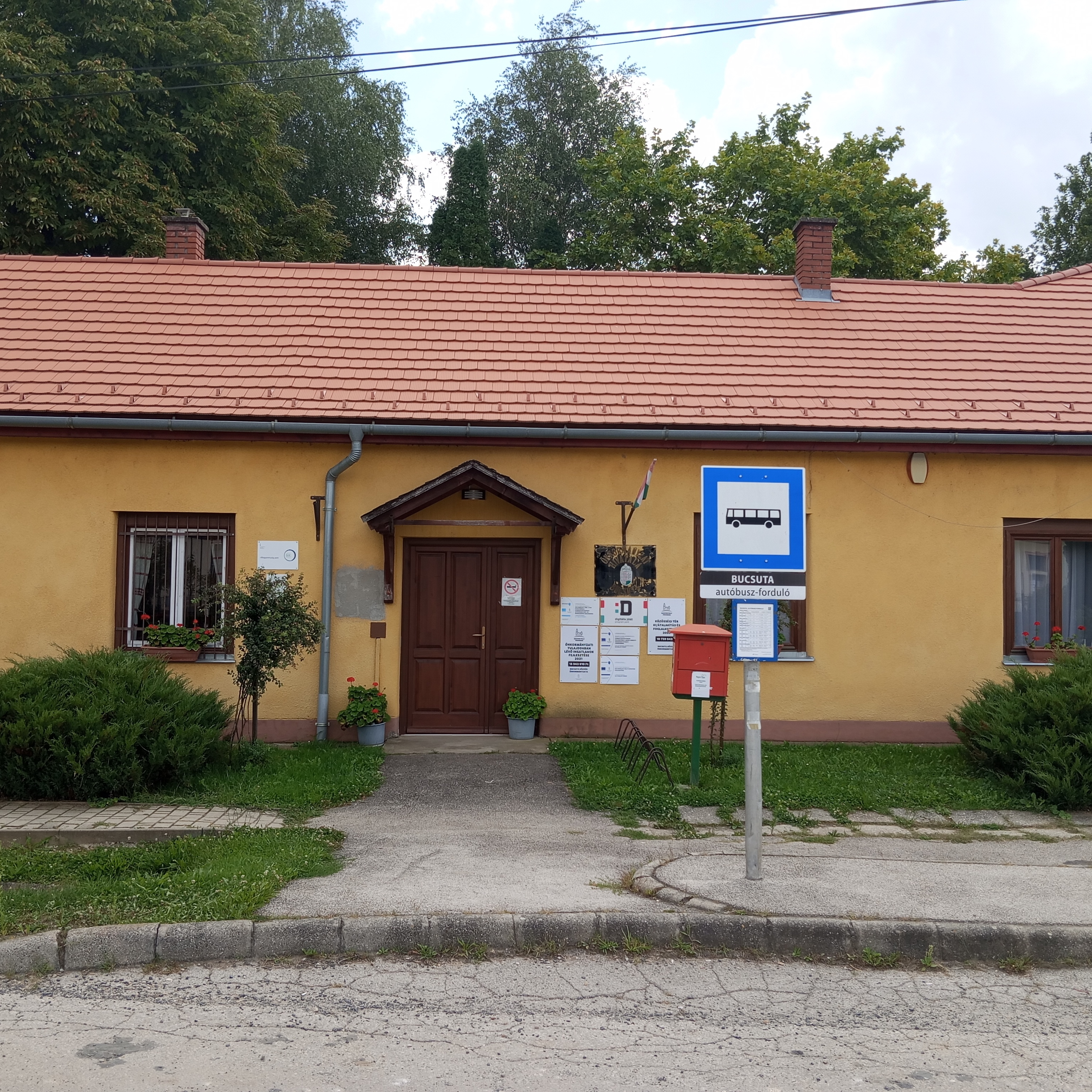
- Town hall

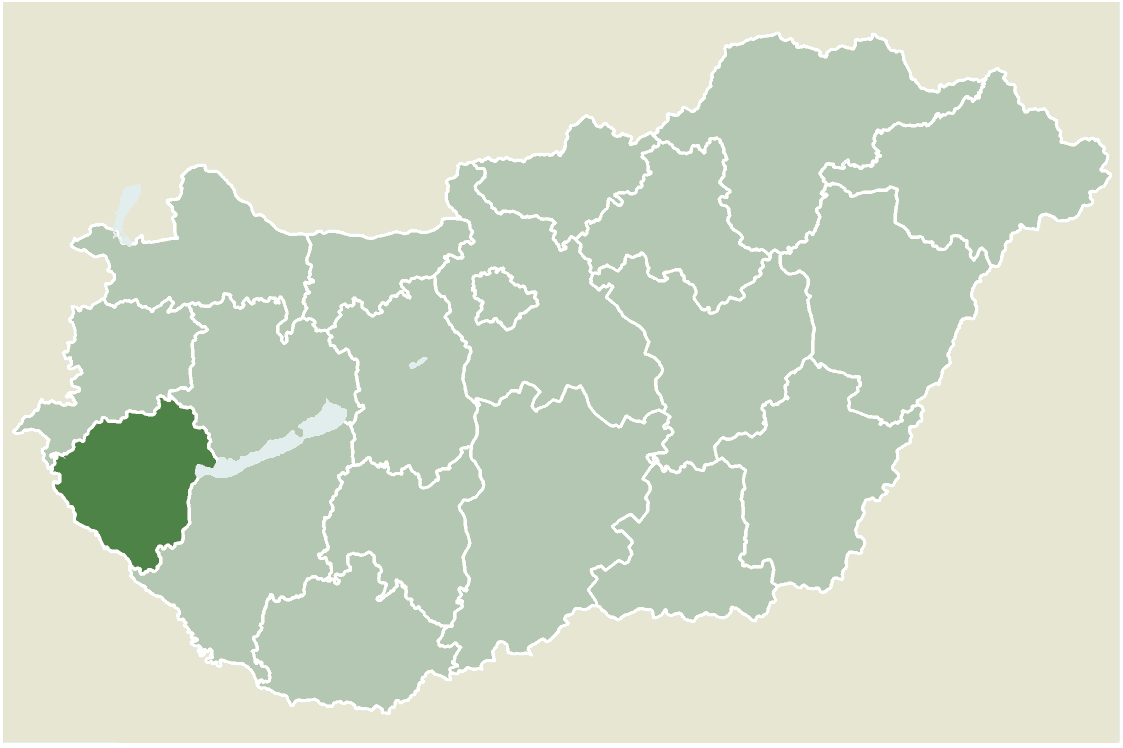
- Location of Zala county in Hungary

- Location of Bucsuta
- Coordinates: 46.56390°N 16.83539°E
- Country: Hungary
- County: Zala

Area
  - Total: 16.19 km^{2} (6.25 sq mi)

Population (2004)
  - Total: 258
  - Density: 15.93/km^{2} (41.3/sq mi)
- Time zone: UTC+1 (CET)
  - Summer (DST): UTC+2 (CEST)
- Postal code: 8893
- Area code: 93

Bucsuta is a village in Zala County, Hungary.
