= Tornyiszentmiklós =

Coordinates: 46°31′N 16°33′E

- Village
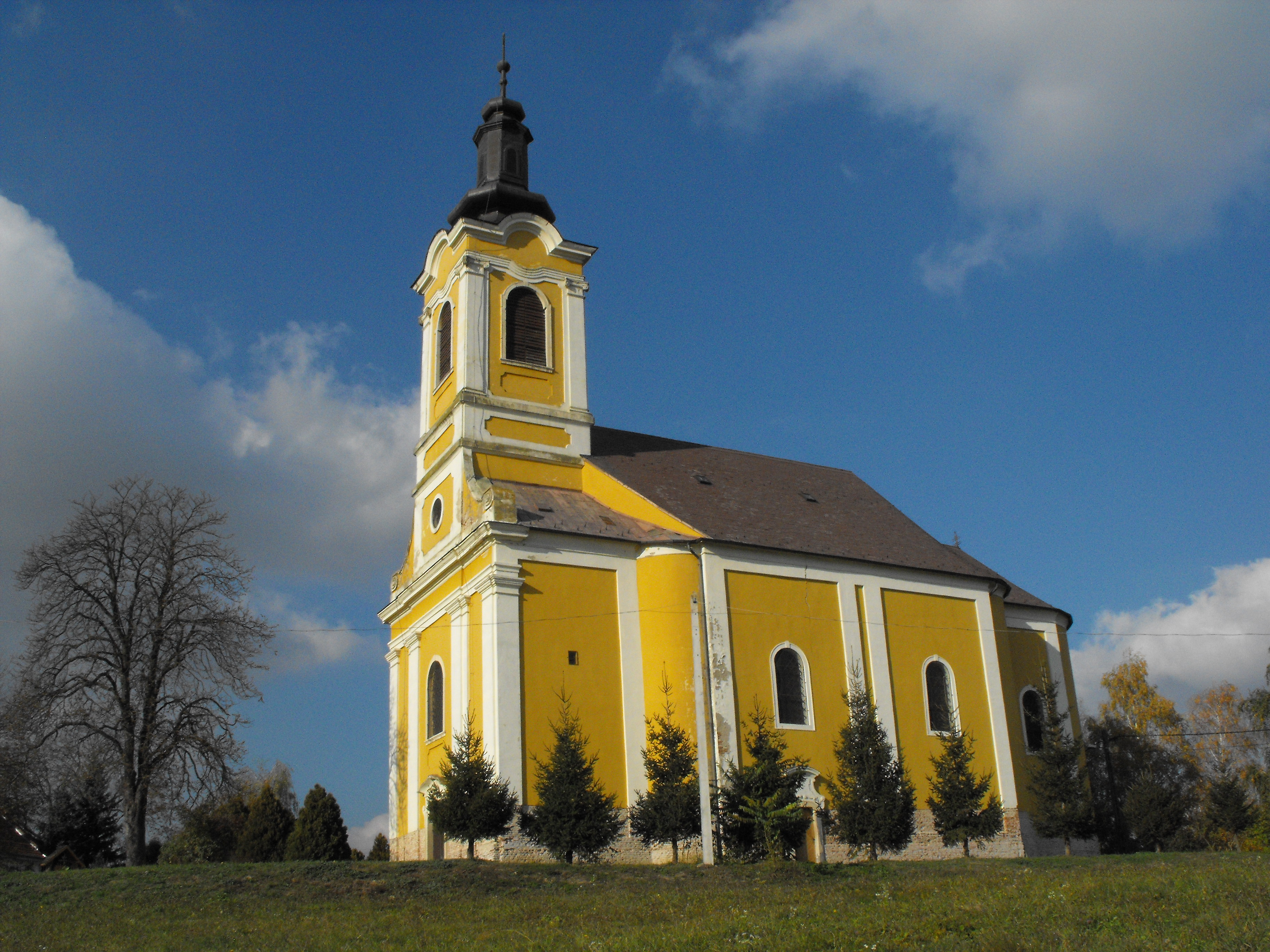
- Church Tornyiszentmiklós
- Interactive map of Tornyiszentmiklós
- Country: Hungary
- Region: Western Transdanubia
- County: Zala County
- Time zone: UTC+1 (CET)
  - Summer (DST): UTC+2 (CEST)
- Motorways: M70
- Distance from Budapest: 251 km (156 mi) Northeast

Tornyiszentmiklós is a village in Zala County, Hungary.
