= Pusztaszentlászló =

Coordinates: 46°38′N 16°51′E

- Village
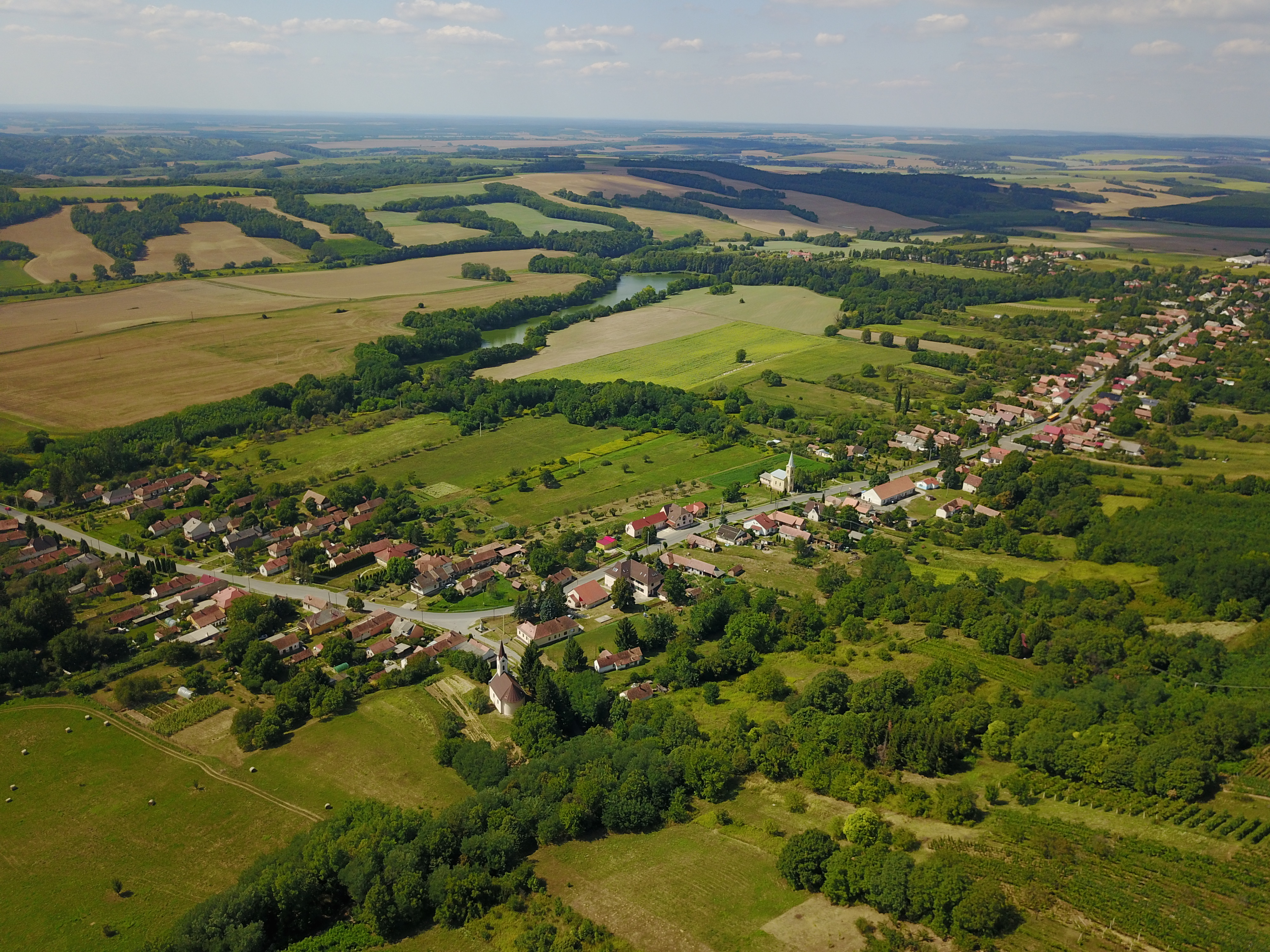
- Pusztaszentlászló Panoramic View 2017
- Interactive map of Pusztaszentlászló
- Country: Hungary
- Region: Western Transdanubia
- County: Zala County
- Time zone: UTC+1 (CET)
  - Summer (DST): UTC+2 (CEST)

Pusztaszentlászló is a village in Zala County, Hungary.
