= Lasztonya =

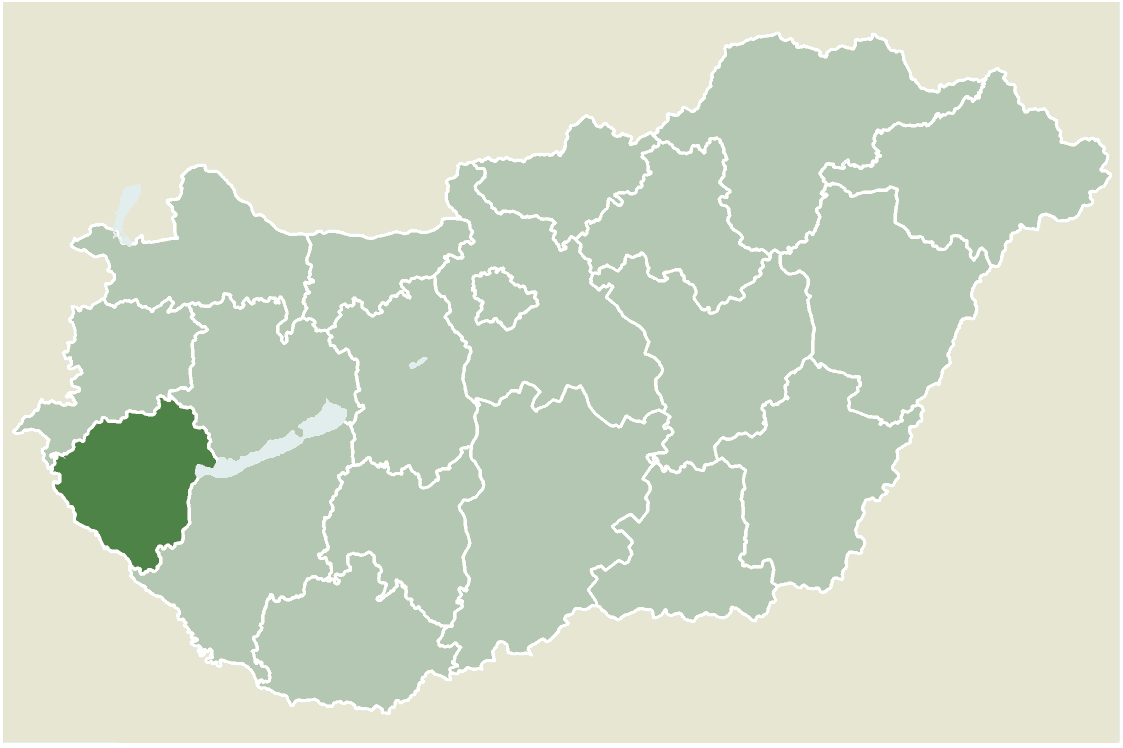
- Location of Zala county in Hungary

- Location of Lasztonya
- Coordinates: 46.55948°N 16.71826°E
- Country: Hungary
- County: Zala

Area
  - Total: 8.77 km^{2} (3.39 sq mi)

Population (2004)
  - Total: 96
  - Density: 10.94/km^{2} (28.3/sq mi)
- Time zone: UTC+1 (CET)
  - Summer (DST): UTC+2 (CEST)
- Postal code: 8887
- Area code: 93

Lasztonya is a village in Zala County, Hungary.
