= Tótvázsony =

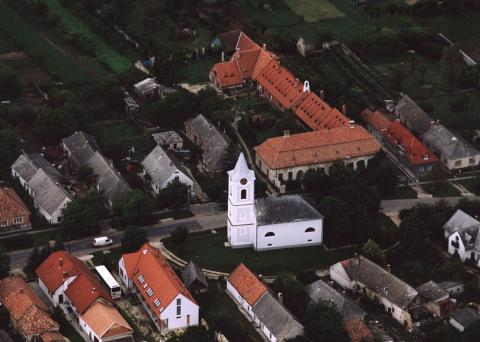
- Aerial view of Tótvázsony

- Flag Coat of arms

- Location of Tótvázsony
- Coordinates: 47.00906°N 17.78759°E
- Country: Hungary
- County: Veszprém

Area
  - Total: 42.51 km^{2} (16.41 sq mi)

Population (2023)
  - Total: 1,396
  - Density: 31.1/km^{2} (81/sq mi)
- Time zone: UTC+1 (CET)
  - Summer (DST): UTC+2 (CEST)
- Postal code: 8246
- Area code: 88

Tótvázsony (German: Totwaschon) is a village in Veszprém county, Hungary.
