= Valkonya =

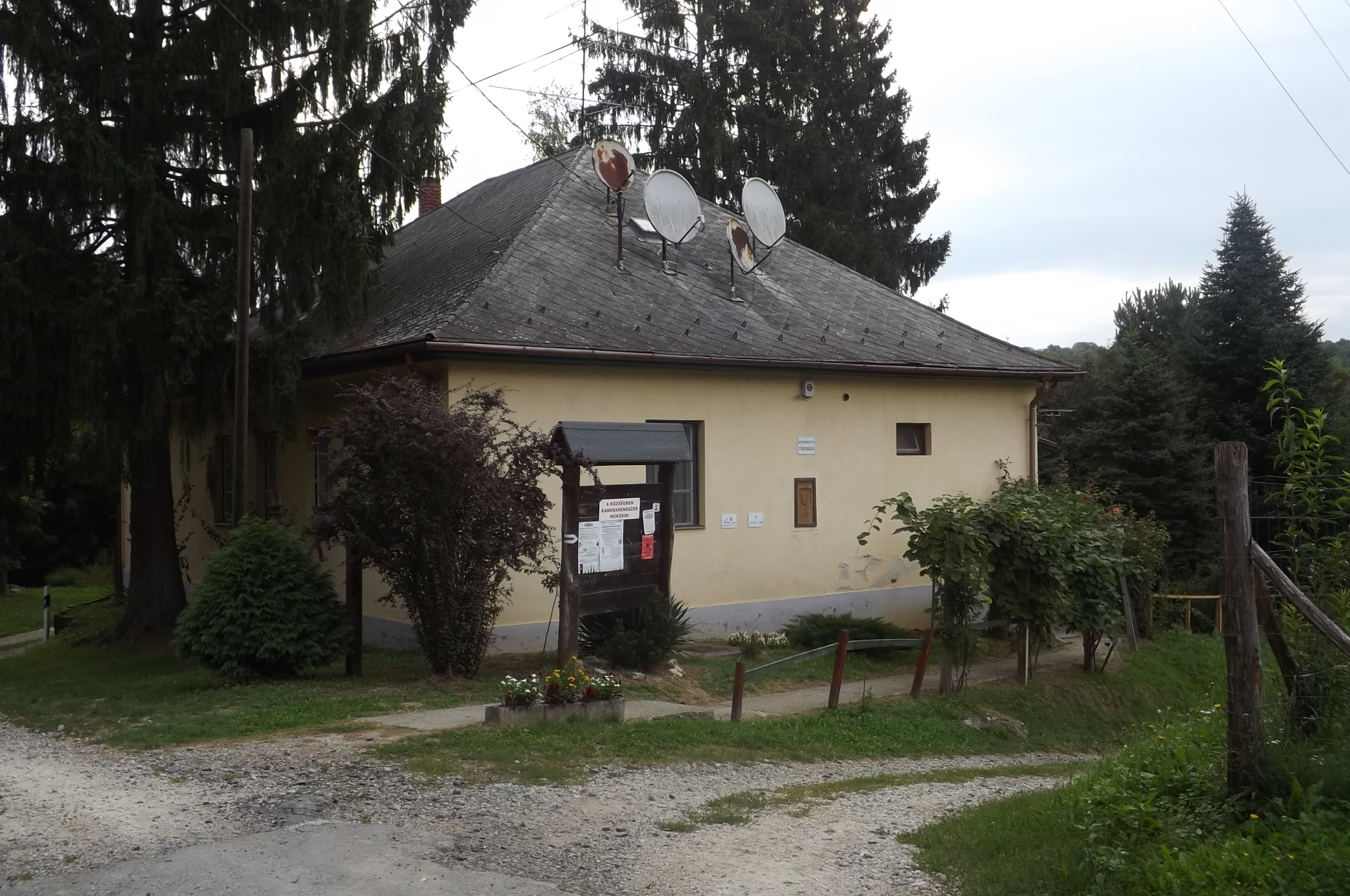

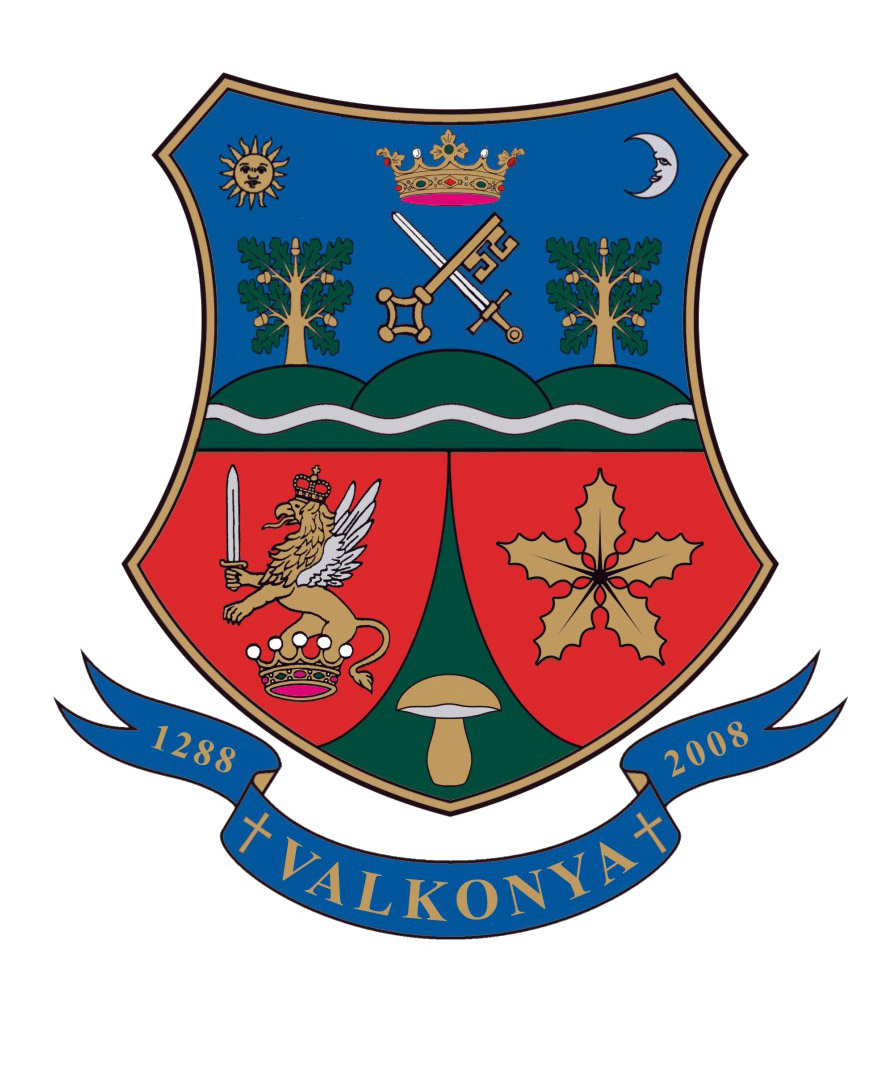
- Coat of arms

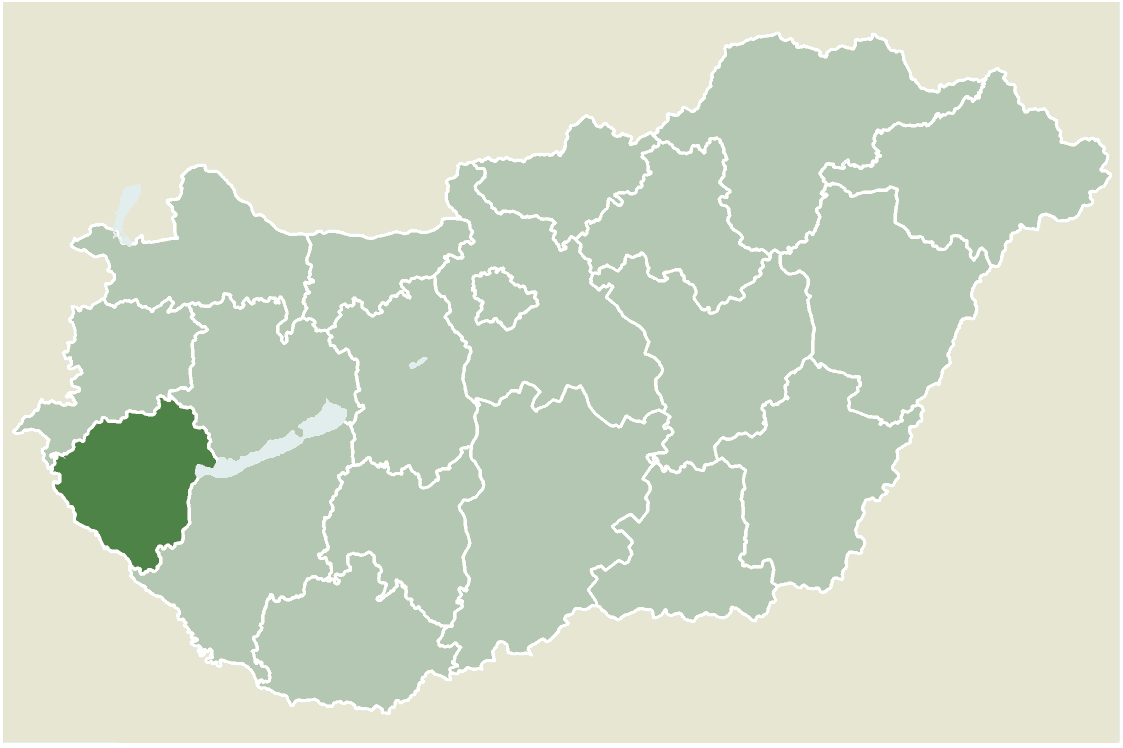
- Location of Zala county in Hungary

- Location of Valkonya
- Coordinates: 46.50040°N 16.80920°E
- Country: Hungary
- County: Zala

Area
  - Total: 7.55 km^{2} (2.92 sq mi)

Population (2004)
  - Total: 68
  - Density: 9/km^{2} (23/sq mi)
- Time zone: UTC+1 (CET)
  - Summer (DST): UTC+2 (CEST)
- Postal code: 8885
- Area code: 93

Valkonya (Croatian: Vlakinja) is a village in Zala County, Hungary.

== Area ==
It has an area of 7.55 square kilometers.
