= Tótszentmárton =

Tótszentmárton Sumarton (in Croatian)
- Village
- Flag Coat of arms

- Location of Tótszentmárton
- Coordinates: 46.416667°N 16.816667°E
- Country: Hungary
- Region: Western Transdanubia
- County: Zala
- District: Letenye

Area
  - Total: 10.17 km^{2} (3.93 sq mi)

Population (1 January 2025)
  - Total: 675
  - Density: 66.4/km^{2} (172/sq mi)
- Time zone: UTC+1 (CET)
  - Summer (DST): UTC+2 (CEST)
- Postal code: 8865
- Area code: (+36) 93
- Motorways: M7
- Distance from Budapest: 230 km (140 mi) Northeast
- Website: totszentmarton.hu

Tótszentmárton is a village in Zala County, Hungary.
