= Gelsesziget =

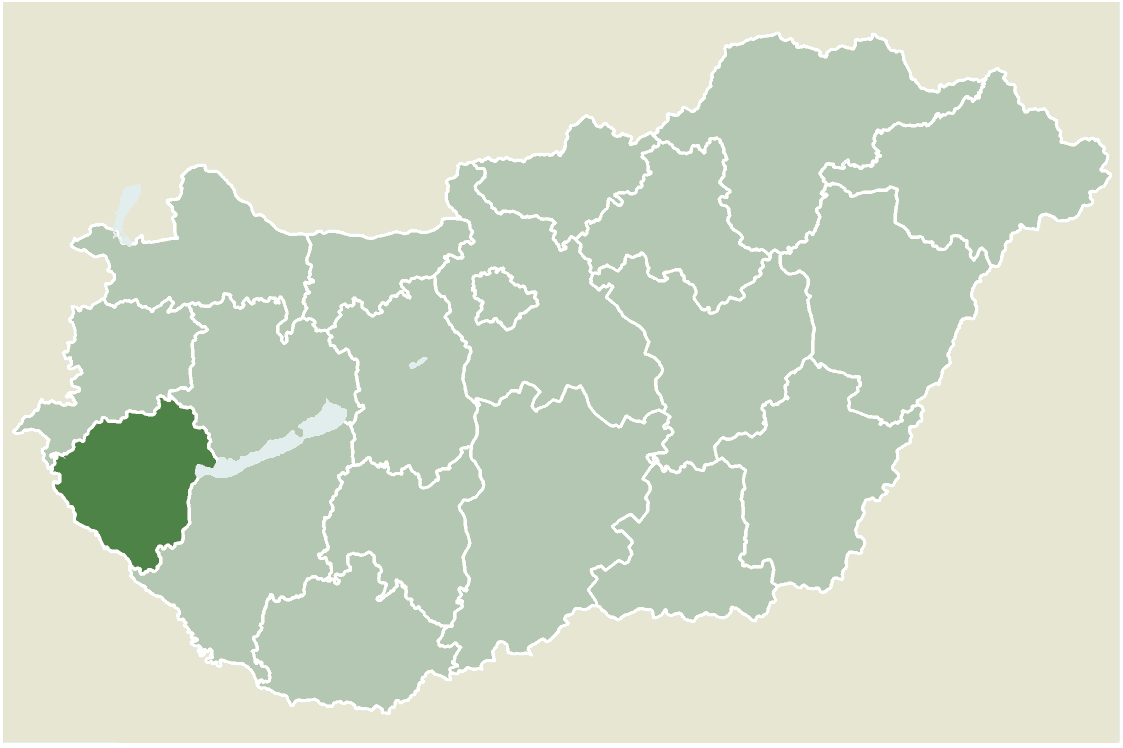
- Location of Zala county in Hungary

- Location of Gelsesziget
- Coordinates: 46.56710°N 16.98838°E
- Country: Hungary
- County: Zala

Area
  - Total: 4.98 km^{2} (1.92 sq mi)

Population (2004)
  - Total: 272
  - Density: 54.61/km^{2} (141.4/sq mi)
- Time zone: UTC+1 (CET)
  - Summer (DST): UTC+2 (CEST)
- Postal code: 8774
- Area code: 93

Gelsesziget is a village in Zala County, Hungary.
