= Letenye =

- Town
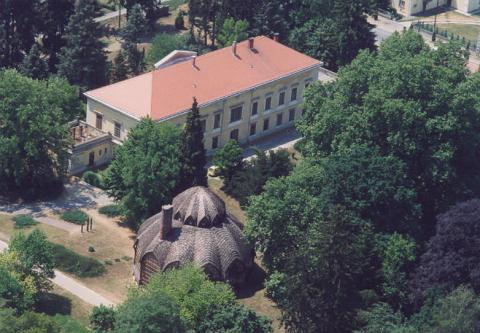
- Aerial view of Letenye

- Flag Coat of arms

- Location of Letenye
- Coordinates: 46.43365°N 16.72248°E
- Country: Hungary
- County: Zala
- District: Letenye

Area
  - Total: 41.74 km^{2} (16.12 sq mi)

Population (2017)
  - Total: 4,041
  - Density: 96.81/km^{2} (250.7/sq mi)
- Time zone: UTC+1 (CET)
  - Summer (DST): UTC+2 (CEST)
- Postal code: 8868
- Area code: (+36) 93
- Motorways: M7, M70
- Distance from Budapest: 232 km (144 mi) Northeast
- Website: www.letenye.hu

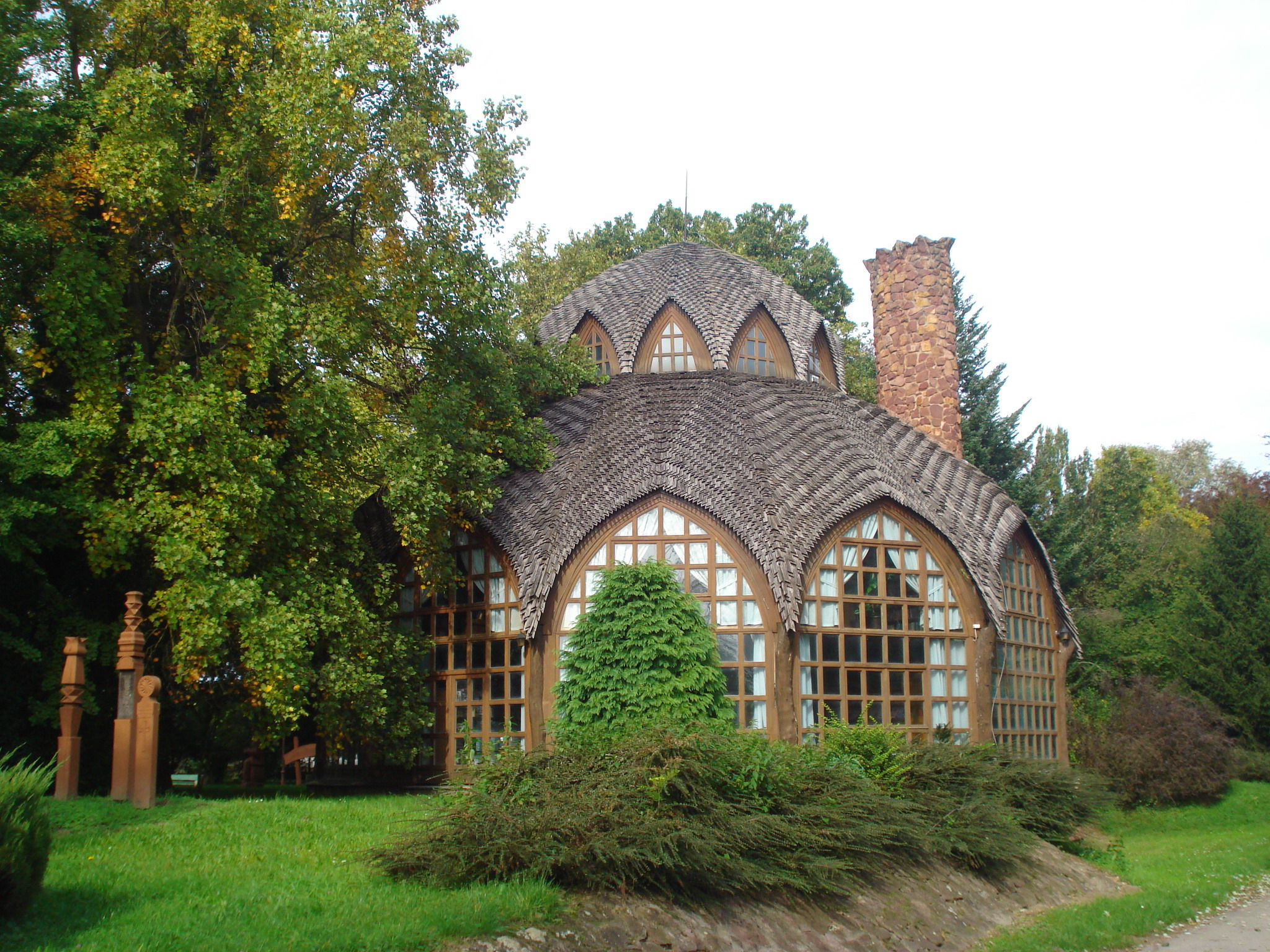
Town Library in Letenye

Letenye (Croatian: Letinja, Slovene: Letina) is a town in Zala County, Hungary, on the border with Croatia. Across the border is the town of Goričan. Letenye was elevated to town status in 1989.

== Transport ==
Letenye is the endpoint of the Hungarian M7 motorway from Budapest. The motorway crosses the Croatian-Hungarian border here and connects with the Croatian A4 motorway at Goričan.

== Notable people ==
- Feró Nagy - Hungarian rock singer, musician

== Twin town ==
Letenye is twinned with:

- Prelog, Croatia

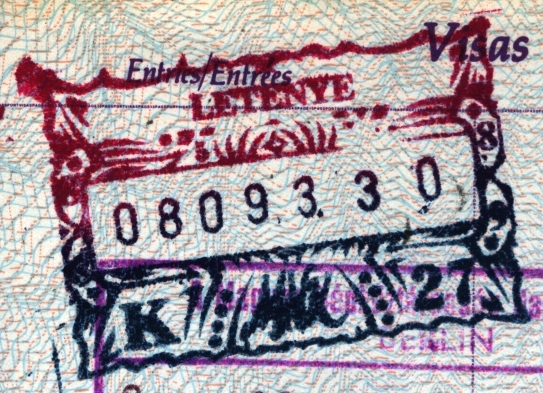
Pre-Schengen passport stamp from Letenye crossing into Goričan, Croatia.

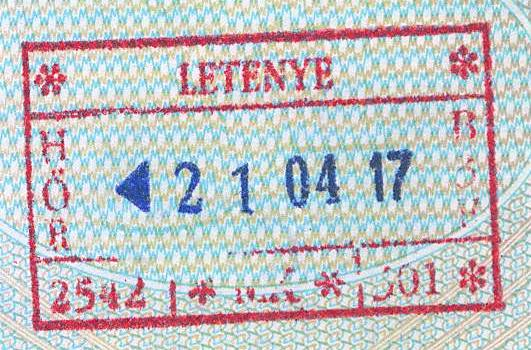
A later passport stamp for the same border crossing.
