= Maróc =

Coordinates: 46°33′N 16°40′E

- Village
- Interactive map of Maróc
- Country: Hungary
- Region: Western Transdanubia
- County: Zala County
- Time zone: UTC+1 (CET)
  - Summer (DST): UTC+2 (CEST)

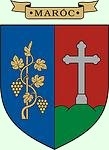

Maróc is a village located in Zala County in Western Hungary.
