= Pacsa =

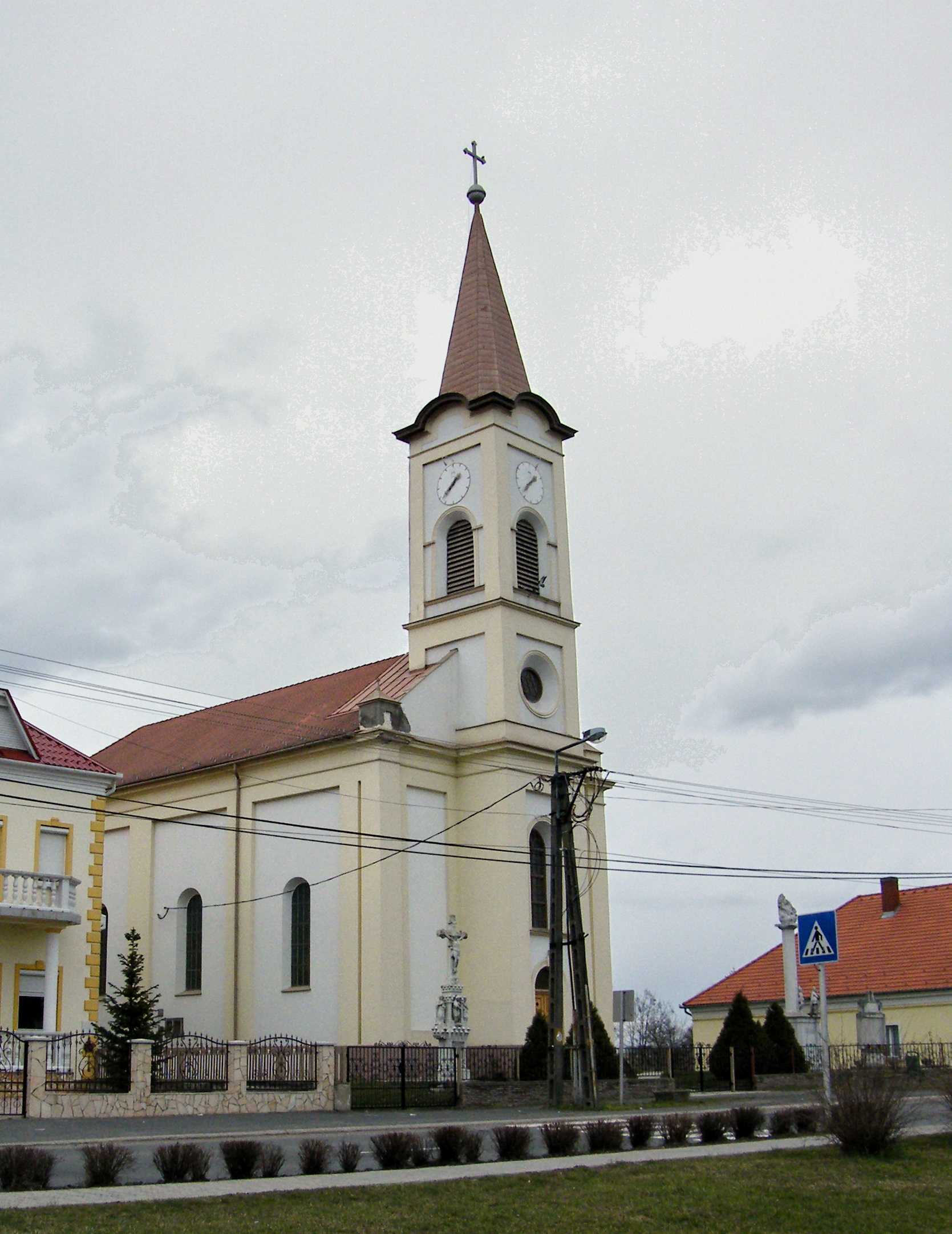
- Roman Catholic Church of John the Baptist in Pacsa.
- Interactive map of Pacsa
- Location of Pacsa
- Coordinates: 46.72046°N 17.01104°E
- Country: Hungary
- County: Zala

Government
  - Mayor: Kelemen Tamás (Ind.)

Area
  - Total: 22.71 km^{2} (8.77 sq mi)

Population (2022)
  - Total: 1,505
  - Density: 66.27/km^{2} (171.6/sq mi)
- Time zone: UTC+1 (CET)
  - Summer (DST): UTC+2 (CEST)
- Postal code: 8761
- Area code: 92
- Website: www.pacsa.hu

Pacsa is a town in Zala County, Hungary.
