= Obrež =

Obrež may refer to:

- Obrež, Varvarin, a village in Serbia
- Obrež, Pećinci, a village in Serbia
- Obrež, Središče ob Dravi, a village in Slovenia
- Obrež Zelinski, a village in Croatia
- Odranski Obrež, a village in Croatia
- Mali Obrež, a village in Slovenia
- Veliki Obrež, a village in Slovenia
- Zgornji Obrež, a village in Slovenia
