= Obrez =

Obrez may refer to:

- Obrez (from Russian: Обрез), a modified firearm, with barrel and stock cut down in length, for example a sawn-off shotgun
  - As a loan-word in English, the term most commonly refers to a Mosin–Nagant modified in such a configuration
- Tina Obrez (born 1986), Slovenian tennis player
- Obrež, Varvarin, a village in Serbia
- Obrež, Pećinci, a village in Serbia
- Obrež, Središče ob Dravi, a village in Slovenia
- Obrež Zelinski, a village in Croatia
- Odranski Obrež, a village in Croatia
- Mali Obrež, a village in Slovenia
- Veliki Obrež, a village in Slovenia
- Zgornji Obrež, a village in Slovenia
