= Battle of Letenye =

Battle during Hungarian Revolution of 1848

Coordinates: 46°24′53″N 16°42′11″E

- Part of the Hungarian Revolution of 1848
Date	17 October 1848
Location	Letenye, Zala County, Kingdom of Hungary
Result	Hungarian victory

Belligerents
Hungarian Revolutionary Army	Austrian Empire: Kingdom of Croatia

Commanders and leaders
Mór Perczel	Lazar Mamula

Strength
3,409+? men 297 horses 8 cannons	~2,400 men 2 cannons

Casualties and losses
3 dead 4 wounded	743 captured

The Battle of Letenye took place during the Hungarian War of Independence of 1848-1849 on 17 October 1848 between the Hungarian Revolutionary Army under the command of General Mór Perczel and the Croatian troops under Colonel Lazar Mamula defending the Muraköz/Međimurje region. Perczel, the leader of the Hungarian brigade which attacked Muraköz, split his troops in two, and his detachment defeated the Croatian troops defending the line of the Mura River. As a result of his victory, together with the victory of the leader of the other column, Major András Gáspár in the Battle of Kotor, Perczel liberated Muraköz from the Croatian troops.

== Background ==
At the beginning of October 1848, after the liberation of Nagykanizsa, Zala County and the southwestern border of Hungary were threatened by two K.u.K. and pro-Habsburg groupings. The corps, under the command of Field Marshal Laval Nugent von Westmeath, who was now in his 72nd year, was then practically a strong brigade of about 2,500 men, and usually consisted of the battalions with the number 4 of each infantry regiments stationing in Styria. There is no information on the composition and number of its artillery. The total number of these troops was hardly more than 5,000, and the revolutionary movements in Styria, especially the unrest in Graz, prevented them from taking offensive action on the Hungarian border.

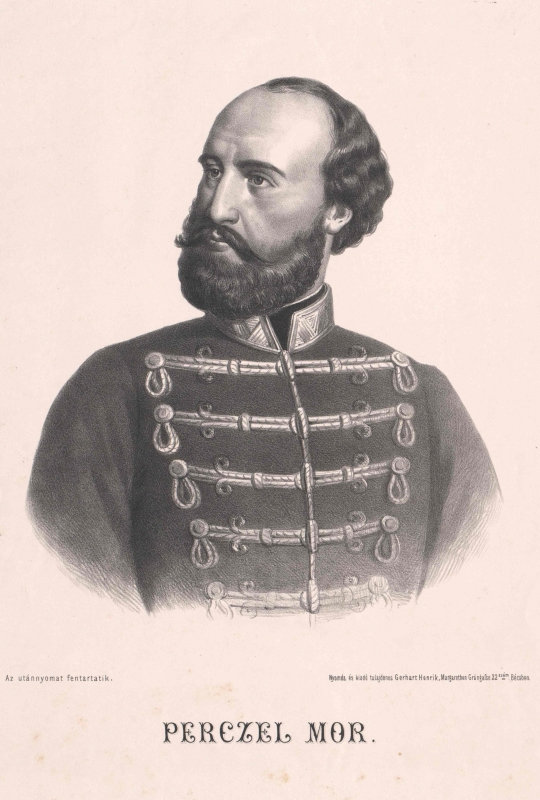
Perczel, Mór (1811 - 1899)

The number of Croatian border guards and imperial troops along the Mura and Drava rivers in Croatia was much larger. Including the units received from the Styrian brigade, it must have numbered between 14 and 15,000 men and had at least 24 guns. A serious disadvantage, however, was that the personnel of the corps was made up mostly of militias and reserve battalions, which were very poorly equipped with small a

Four companies of the Hungarian volunteers from Zala County went to Zalaegerszeg for equipment, while the Sándor Hussars also camped near the town. The Somogy County National Guards, together with part of the Zala County Popular Uprising, kept an eye on the Mura from Légrád to Letenye, trying unsuccessfully to retake the bridges from Kakonya, Légrád, and Letenye from the Croats at 9 am on 7 October. During the attack, both the Somogy and Zala county companies (with one exception) were retreating rather than advancing. Profiting from their victory, the Croats crossed the Mura, ransacked the castle of Letenye, and threatened to burn the whole region. Major Jakab Palocsay, the commander of the Somogy National Guards, did not trust his own forces and even had Kiskanizsa (today is part of Nagykanizsa) surrounded with ramparts in order to repel the enemy who, he feared, might attack again. So he was also sincerely and pleasantly surprised to hear that the enemy had destroyed the bridge and retreated to the Muraköz (the region between the Drava and the Mura rivers, today part of Croatia, called Međimurje County). However, rumors such as that Nugent had crossed the Drava at Dombom with 4,000 men and was preparing to attack Nagykanizsa from the Muraköz, gave cause for concern. On the other side, there were similar concerns. On 9 October, Lieutenant General Dahlen, the commander-in-chief of the Zagreb commandment in chief, received news that the Hungarians had crossed the Drava at two points and rushed here, but the news proved to be wrong.

== Prelude ==
After the victory at Ozora on 7 October, Colonel Mór Perczel's Hungarian army rested for a few days and then set off for Veszprém. He was originally supposed to move to support the troops pursuing Kuzman Todorović's Croatian troops which were sent home by Lieutenant General Josip Jelačić after the Hungarian army defeated him on 29 September in the Battle of Pákozd, forcing him to retreat from Hungary towards Vienna. On arriving in Veszprém, however, Perczel decided not to join the main army with his troops, but to march to Nagykanizsa. He justified his decision by the fact that, according to the news he had received, another attack by Colonel Albert Nugent, who had been driven out of Nagykanizsa, was expected at any moment. At the time, Perczel believed that the Croatian troops led by Major General Todorović, were also trying to return to Croatia through Vas and Zala counties, and he wanted to prevent this as well. Perczel arrived in Tapolca on 13 October, in Keszthely on 14 October, in Kiskomárom (Zalakomár) on 15 October, and in Nagykanizsa on 16 October. Perczel concentrated his troops here and then moved to liberate the Muraköz.

=== Balance of Forces ===
During Perczel's campaign to liberate Muraköz, the following enemy armies were in Croatia and Styria. Todorović's troops at Maribor (18 October), with a total of 14,159 men, 80 horses, and 6 cannons; the troops under the command of the Legrad local military commandment, with a total of 10728 men; the troops under the command of the Varaždin local military commandment, with a total of 12,534 men; the Austrian K.u.K. troops stationing in Graz, with a total of 2,365 men and 268 horses; the Austrian K.u.K. troops stationing in Pettau, with a total of 3,443 men and 1,131 horses.

Against these troops, numbering in total 43,229 men, Perczel commanded the following troops.

Unit	Companies	Number	Horses	Cannons
Hunyadi-troop	4	1,093	6	-
Zrínyi-troop	6	1,341	40	-
Mobile Volunteer National Guards' Battalion of Szabolcs County	5	740	16	-
Mobile Volunteer National Guards' Battalion of Zala County	6	1,206	9	-
1st company of the Colonel's Squadron of the 4th Hussar Regiment	1	114	112	-
Major's Squadron of the 9th Hussar Regiment	2	206	209	-
Mobile Volunteer National Guards' Half Battery of Kassa	-	71	45	4
1st 6-pounder Honvéd Battery	-	164	88	8
Total	24	4,935	525	12

Perczel divided his troops into two columns. The column he led was made up of the Hunyadi troop, the volunteers from Szabolcs and Zala counties, the national guards from Nagykanizsa, from the Alexander and Nicholas Hussars a company each, and the newly formed 6-pounder battery (with eight guns). This crossed the Mura at Letenye. The other column was led by András Gáspár, who was promoted to major after the success at Ozora. The infantry of this column consisted of the Zrínyi troop, the volunteers from Sopron, the Somogy and the Szepetnek national guards led by Királyi Pál, the cavalry of one company of Nicholas Hussars, and the artillery of 6 guns.

== Battle ==
Perczel's column marched through Kiskanizsa, Becsehely, and Pola to Letenye. Here he was informed that about 200 Croats were working on the left bank of the Mura to rebuild the bridge at Letenye. The bridgehead was defended by two companies of the 27th (Piret) Infantry Line Regiment, two battalions of Croatian Popular Insurgent Battalions totaling 1,000 men, a few sappers, and two 3-pounder guns. The Hussars first pushed back the Croatian outposts, then galloped towards the bridgehead to cut off the retreat of the Croats working on the bridge at the left bank. However, a volley of fire from the K.u.K. Infantry forced them to stop, and two enemy guns protected by the entrenchments on the opposite bank prevented the Hungarians from advancing again with well-directed fire.

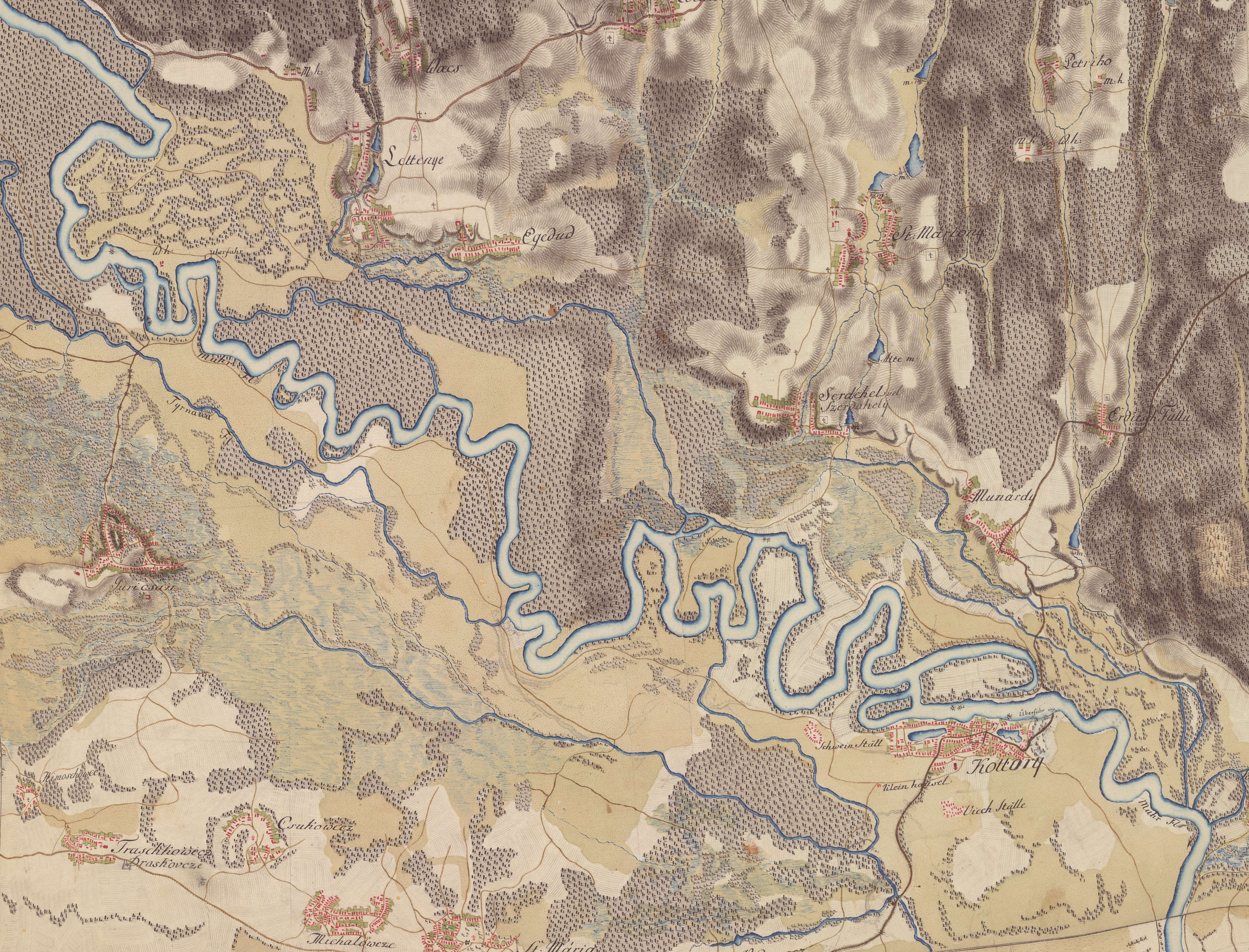
The Mura river between Letenye and Kotor at the end of the 18th century

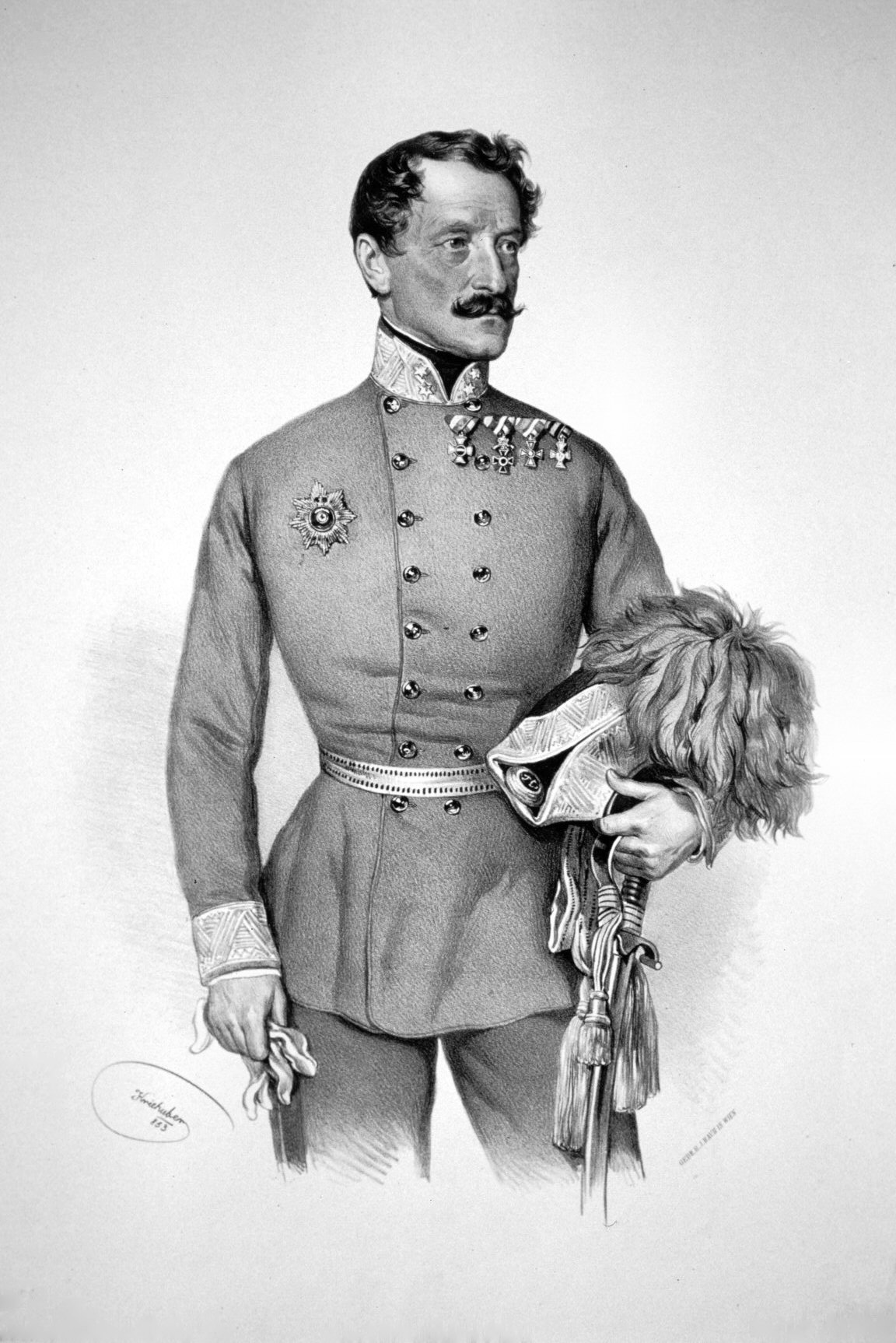
Lazarus Freiherr von Mamula

In the meantime the Hungarian battery also arrived, first with 4, then with 8 guns, firing at the enemy artillery. The firing lasted for about two hours, and as a result of the Hungarian artillery fire, the Croats on guard on the other side of the river began to flee in increasing numbers. Around 11 o'clock the enemy artillery ran out of ammunition, and Captain Saffran, the commander of the bridge guard, together with the sappers, sent the two guns back towards Csáktornya. One Croatian National Insurrectionist battalion followed their example, and the two line regiment companies had no choice but to try to retreat in order.

At this time, a company of Hunyadi troop, who were in the first line of the Hungarian battle order, crossed to the other side of the river on the footbridge mounted by the Croats on the mill’s ships, and, using the timber brought partly from Nagykanizsa, partly found on the other bank of the river, in two hours they built a bridge, on which the infantry, artillery, and cavalry could now cross.

Meanwhile, the enemy rearguard encountered half a company of the 1st (Archduke John) Dragoon Regiment, two guns, and 50-60 Croatian popular insurgents led by Colonel Lazarus Freiherr von Mamula on the road to Csáktornya. Mamula ordered his unit of just under 400 men forward but then changed his mind and chose to retreat, arriving in Varaždin on the morning of the 18th.

During the pursuit, the Hunyadi troop and the Zala volunteers surrounded a battalion of 743 enemy popular insurrectionists, which surrendered. This Croatian unit had the duty to defend the Mura River's line between Letenye and Kottori, and after the Hungarian crossing, tried to retreat towards Csáktornya.

== Aftermath ==
Perczel's total losses were 3 dead, 3 wounded artillerymen, and a captain of the Hunyadi troop. Perczel's column marched through Hodosány and set up camp beyond the village. On the morning of 18 October, Perczel moved on to Csáktornya, arriving there around noon.

== Sources ==
- Bóna, Gábor (1987). Tábornokok és törzstisztek a szabadságharcban 1848–49 ("Generals and Staff Officers in the War of Freedom 1848–1849") (in Hungarian). Budapest: Zrínyi Katonai Kiadó. p. 430. ISBN 963-326-343-3.
- Hermann, Róbert (2001), 1848-1849 a szabadságharc hadtörténete ("Military History of 1848-1849") (in Hungarian), Budapest: Korona, ISBN 963-9376-21-3
- Hermann, Róbert (2004). Az 1848–1849-es szabadságharc nagy csatái ("Great battles of the Hungarian War of Independence of 1848–1849") (in Hungarian). Budapest: Zrínyi. p. 408. ISBN 963-327-367-6.
- Hermann, Róbert (1997), "Kanizsa felszabadítása 1848. október 3-án ("The Liberation of Kanizsa on 3 October 1848")" (PDF), Zalai Múzeum 07 (in Hungarian)
- Hermann, Róbert (1998), "Perczel Mór fegyverszüneti tárgyalásai 1848. október végén ("Mór Perczel's Cease-Fire Negotiations on End of October 1848")", Aetas (13) 2. pp. 74-106 (in Hungarian)
- Schmidt-Brentano, Antonio (2007). Die k. k. bzw. k. u. k. Generalität 1816-1918 ("Officers of the K.K and K.u.K. Army") (in German). Budapest: Österreichisches Staatsarchiv. p. 211.
