= Battle of Friedau =

Battle during Hungarian Revolution of 1848

Coordinates: 46°24′27.8″N 16°08′55.3″E

- Part of the Hungarian Revolution of 1848
Date	8 November 1848
Location	Friedau, Duchy of Styria, Habsburg monarchy, today Ormož, Slovenia
Result	Hungarian victory

Belligerents
Hungarian Revolutionary Army	Austrian Empire

Commanders and leaders
Mór Perczel	Johann Wilhelm Burits de Pournay

Strength
4,935 men 525 horses 12 cannons	1,681 + ? men 324 + ? horses 6 cannons

Casualties and losses
1 dead 12 wounded 2 missing or captured 2 horses	1 dead 8 wounded 27 (47) missing or captured 6 horses

The Battle of Friedau was a battle in the Hungarian War of Independence of 1848-1849, fought on 8 November 1848 between the Hungarian Revolutionary Army under the command of General Mór Perczel and the Austrian K.u.K. troops under General Johann Wilhelm Burits de Pournay. Perczel, after liberating on 17 October the Muraköz, at the beginning of November, got information that the Austrian troops from Styria and the Croatian troops plan to perform a concentrated attack against him, with much superior forces, so he decided to do a preemptive attack against the Austrian troops from Styria. He defeated the troops of General Burits at Friedau, then retreated back to Hungary, thus securing Muraköz for another month.

== Background ==
After the complete cleansing of the Muraköz (the region between the Drava and the Mura rivers, today part of Croatia, called Međimurje County), thanks to the Battles of Letenye and Kotor, General Mór Perczel gathered information from the Croatian regions until Varasd. Because of the rugged terrain, he found it increasingly difficult to perform reconnaissance activities, also because the bushy, wooded landscape made it difficult to use cavalry for this. But he knew from reconnaissance data that there was a significant enemy force in and around Varasd (Varaždin), which was twice his own strength. On 21 October, he had learned that Todorović's 12,000-strong column was on its way to Varasd. This news prompted him to abandon his plan to capture the bridge at Varasd and devote all his efforts to fortifying Csáktornya.

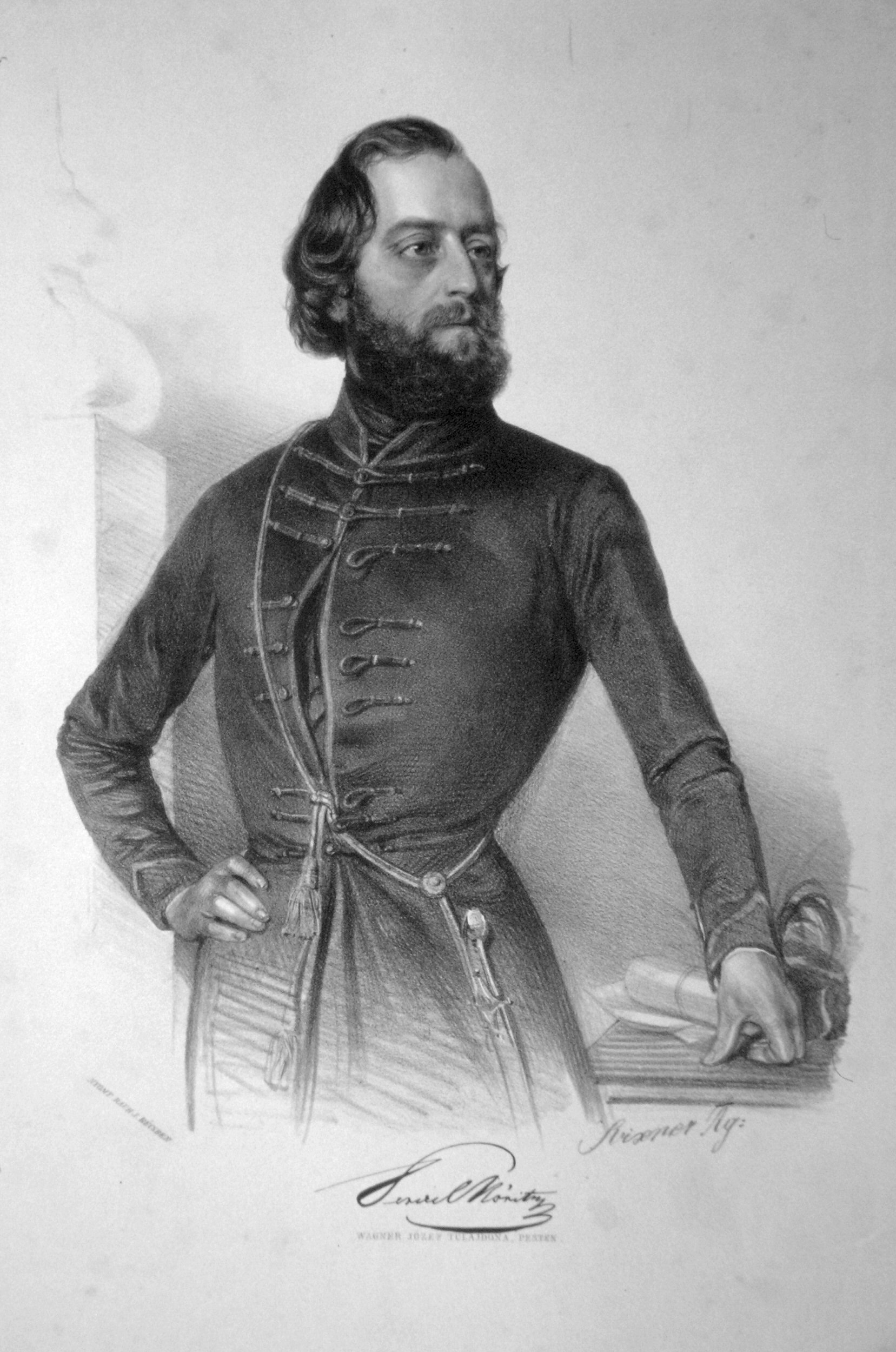
Moritz Perczel

In his report to the National Defence Commission (the temporary de facto Hungarian government led by Lajos Kossuth), written on 21 October, Perczel had written that his position was very precarious, and a very heroic defense will be necessary to hold it. On 24 October, he considered any more daring campaign impossible until the defense works at Csáktornya will be completed. On 27 October, he reported to the National Defense Committee that at Varasd, under the command of General Dahlen, the following troops were positioned: the Johann Dragoons, the Otočac border guards recalled from Italy, the 12,000 men of Todorović, the border guards and the insurrectionists withdrawn from the Muraköz, with 18 guns and half Congreve rocket battery. At the same time, Perczel reported that Styria was defended by Major-General Laval Nugent von Westmeath and Major-General Benko with 4,000 to 5,000 men and 24 guns. In his reports of 27 and 30 October, he clearly made any further offensive movements dependent on the arrival of reinforcements.

The National Defence Committee (OHB) also recommended caution. Already when Perczel entered Muraköz, when it took his first victory report, it gave him the task only to retake Muraköz. At the time, the OHB instructed him to keep an eye on Todorović's army, because it feared that it will attack Perczel from behind, while he was attacking Croatia. On 1 November - still unaware of the Hungarian defeat at Schwechat - the OHB also wrote to Perczel that he could not expect any reinforcements for the time being.

Perczel's situation was quite dangerous. The Croats could cross the Drava at any time, and the conduct of the Styrian Imperial troops was also uncertain. He was therefore relieved when he received a letter from Major General Burits, the commander of the Vanguard of the Styrian K.u.K. Army Corps. Burits said he would like to meet Perczel as soon as possible. Perczel's envoy returned with a request from Burits and Nugent for the restoration of travel and traffic between Hungary and Styria and for a cease-fire between the Hungarian and Styrian armies. By 30 October however, the negotiations had failed. The Styrian commanders wanted to include also the Croats in the negotiations, but the Croats refused.

== Prelude ==
Incoming intelligence reports showed that Burits used the negotiations to reinforce his troops. Perczel came to the conclusion that the Croatian army in Varasd and Légrád, and the Styrian K.u.K. army were preparing a concentrated attack against him on 9 November to take Muraköz. Perczel convened the military council, which accepted the proposal of the Chief of General Staff, Lieutenant Colonel Miklós Gaál and Perczel that the enemy attack must be prevented and at least one of the opposing armies must be pushed back. The attack was also motivated by the fact that Perczel could only expect the Veszprém and Somogy National Guards to remain at duty until mid-November when their period of conscription expired. Thus, on 8 November, he was able to launch a relatively large offensive for the last time, mobilizing most of his army. The attack against Varasd was made more difficult by the need to cross the river, so the attack on Styria was chosen, where no such obstacle stood in the way of the Hungarian troops. Perczel's concern was justified indeed; Nugent and Dahlen had already agreed on 27 October that whichever of them was attacked, the other would attack in the rear of the Hungarians.

=== Opposing forces ===
The Hungarians:

Unit	Companies	Number	Horses	Cannons
Hunyadi-troop	4	1,093	6	-
Zrínyi-troop	6	1,341	40	-
Mobile Volunteer National Guards' Battalion of Szabolcs County	5	740	16	-
Mobile Volunteer National Guards' Battalion of Zala County	6	1,206	9	-
1st company of the Colonel's Squadron of the 4th Hussar Regiment	1	114	112	-
Major's Squadron of the 9th Hussar Regiment	2	206	209	-
Mobile Volunteer National Guards' Half Battery of Kassa	-	71	45	4
1st 6-pounder Honvéd Battery	-	164	88	8
Total	24	4,935	525	12

The Austrians:

Unit	Companies	Number	Horses	Cannons
13th Infantry Regiment	2	220	-	-
2nd battalion of the 26th Infantry Regiment	6	620	-	-
Two Landwehr companies of the 27th Infantry Regiment	2	340	-	-
9th Kaiserjäger Battalion	2	197	-	-
Colonel's and Majors's Squadrons of the 1st Dragoon Regiment	4	304	304	-
6-pounder Infantry Battery	-	?	?	6
Total	16	1,681 + ?	304 + ?	6

Perczel ordered the attack on the evening of 7 November. He mobilized the Zrínyi troop, the 1-4th companies of the Hunyadi troop, the Szabolcs and Zala volunteer battalions, the Kassa half battery of the Mobile Volunteer National Guard from the regions lying eastwards from the Tisza stream (Tiszáninneni), the First Honvéd battery, i.e. 12 guns in total, a platoon of the Radetzky Hussars, one company of the Alexander Hussars and two companies of the Nicholas Hussars. He sent a platoon of Radetzky's Hussars towards the Varasd bridge, and with the three guns there they hit the enemy's positions on the opposite bank. Perczel deployed the troops for the attack at midnight, and at 1 o'clock in the morning on the 8th of November, he set off from Csáktornya towards Nedelic. This was probably intended, in case if they noticed his movements, to make the enemy outposts think that he was heading for Varasd. Before Nedelic, however, he turned his troops towards Friedau. The Hungarian vanguard was led by Major András Gáspár.

== Battle ==
They reached Polsterau at 6 o'clock in the morning. Perczel sent forward the 1-2 companies of Zrínyi's troop, led by Captains János Bangya and Ágoston Kovács, and the Miklós Hussars against the enemy outposts camped in the mill behind the town. They stormed and partly killed, partly captured and chased back an outpost consisting of 20 dragoons and a platoon of the 9th Kaiserjäger Battalion. The Johann Dragoons lost 2 dead, 2 wounded, several prisoners and 3 missing, while the kaiserjägers lost 12 prisoners. Historian and revolutionary Pál Vasváry and Sergeant András Umheiser distinguished themselves in the fight.

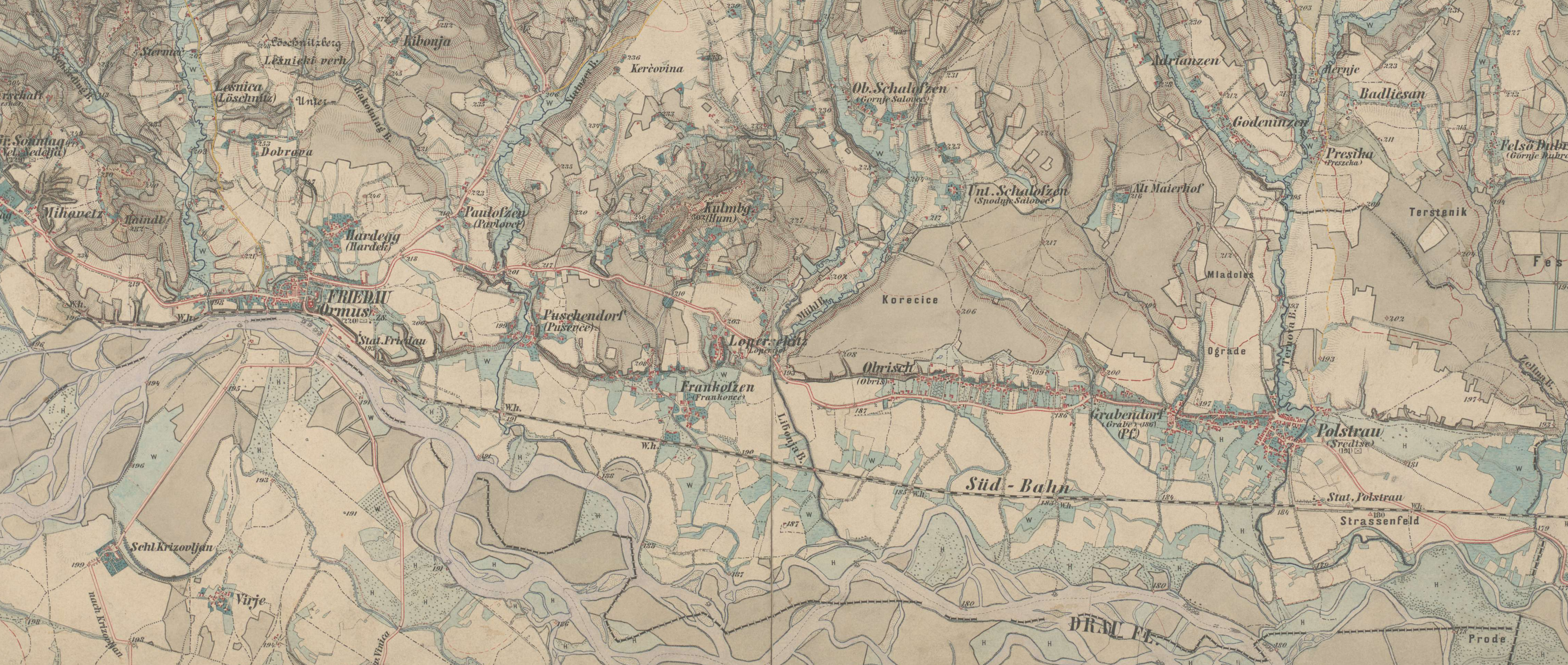
Friedau and Polsterau before 1869 according to the Third Military Survey of the Habsburg Empire

The Austrian vanguard tried to block Perczel's army on two more occasions before Friedau. 1700 paces in front of the town, at the farm from Loperschitz, the Johann Dragoons, the kaiserjägers, and 20 men of the 13th (Wimpffen) Infantry Regiment, coming to replace the vanguard, took up a position, but were driven off by three shots of the Hungarian artillery. Perczel sent the Szabolcs troop and the Zrínyi battalion against the kaiserjägers hiding in the forest. But only part of the battalion followed the order, the others dispersed and marched past the forest. The kaiserjägers hiding in the woods were thus driven back by the skirmish line of the Zrínyi troops.

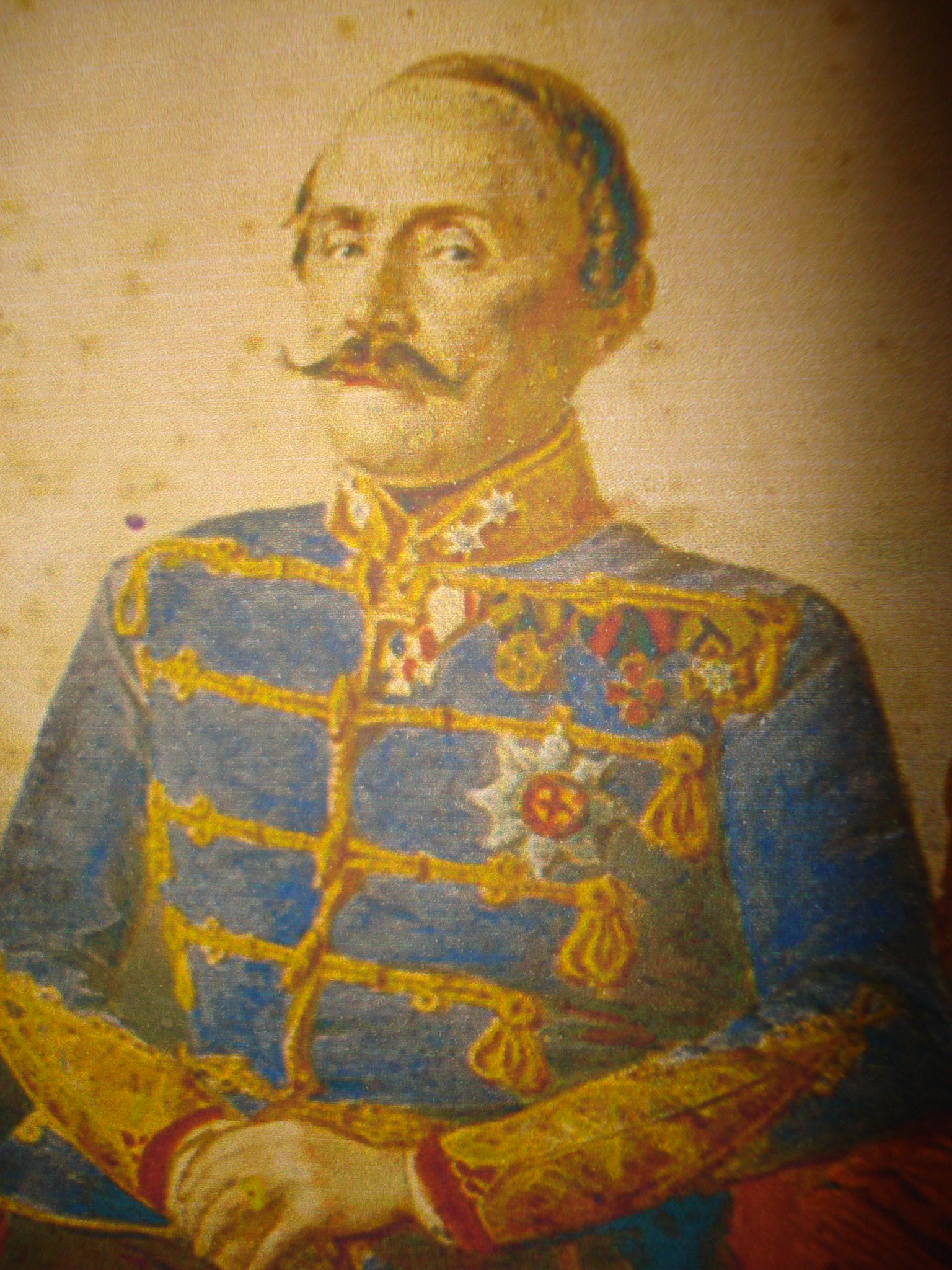
Johann Wilhelm Burits

700 paces before Friedau the Imperial troops took up a defensive position again, but their new attempt to resist was again not successful. Before reaching the town, Perczel deployed his troops for battle. On the right wing the Hunyadi troop, in the center the Szabolcs volunteer battalion, on the left wing the Zrínyi troop advanced. The Zala volunteer battalion remained in reserve. The Hunyadi troop came within range of the enemy artillery on the banks of the Drava, and was hit by 16 grapeshots from the enemy mortars. Perczel personally designated the firing position for the Hungarian artillery. The two howitzers of the 1st Honvéd infantry battery and two guns of the Kassa half-battalion started firing at the enemy artillery; the other 8 guns could not be deployed due to the limited space. Perczel sent the Zrínyi troop to attack the enemy artillery, so their 3rd Company led by Captain István Rosty, stormed with a bayonet charge the enemy artillery and forced it to retreat, and thus enabling the Hunyadi troop to advance.

The Hungarian infantry captured, through a bayonet charge the town. In the assault, especially the Szabolcs battalion and the company of the Zrínyi Battalion, led by Károly Andorffy distinguished themselves. Andorffy was also wounded. The soldiers of the two battalions went house to house to clear the town of kaiserjägers. During the capture of the town, the Zrínyi troop, led by Major Szekulits, mistakenly fired on Rosty's company, wounding 10 men. The Szabolcs troop took a house by siege and disarmed the 4 enemy soldiers inside. Then a company of the Zrínyi battalion also stormed the house, and fired so heavily that even the Hussars entering the town stopped. This gave the enemy's two cannons time to escape.

The K.u.K. troops took up position on the high ground west of the town and fired with six guns from a covered firing position at the four guns of the Hungarian artillery. The place of these was personally appointed by Lieutenant Colonel Miklós Gaál. After a half-hour artillery duel, the Austrian artillery shot out the wheels of both guns of the artillerymen of Kassa, wounding also the commander, Károly Turcsányi. Now the two howitzers of the Honvéd battery remained, but they were still able to counter the fire of the enemy artillery. The sources do not say why Perczel did not send more cannons forward from the reserve. Hadijelentésében külön kiemelte az ellenséges tüzérség és a vadászok működését. The firing continued until 11 o'clock, when Perczel ordered the retreat. The enemy retreated to Gross-Sonntag, not daring to pursue Perczel. The Hungarian army returned to Csáktornya by 6 pm.

== Aftermath ==
According to Perczel's report, the city food commissioner offered Colonel Gaál to supply the Hungarian troops with food, but Gaál refused, saying that the Hungarian army is not the Styrian army, but only came against the ugly instruments of tyranny - i.e. against the imperial army, and thus he did not want to be a burden on the locals. This had the unfortunate consequence that most of the army fought that day hungry and thirsty. Some of the retreating Hungarians were offered bread and wine by the inhabitants of the villages and Polsterau on their way back.

The next day, Perczel was informed that Jellačić's border guard battalions and four 12-pounder guns had arrived in Graz to besiege Csáktornya. A military council was held, which decided to abandon the Muraköz region in two days. Perczel hoped that this retreat could be carried out undisturbed. His army left Muraköz on 11 November, which had become almost like Lake Balaton because of the flood. This was a last-minute move, as the waters of the Mura swept away the bridge at Letenye a few hours after the crossing.

The attack on Friedau was therefore a typical example of a pre-emptive attack carried out at the right time and at the right pace. Perczel and Miklós Gaál made good use of their time and forces, and managed to gain the few days necessary to ensure a smooth evacuation of the Muraköz. The generals of the opposing side, despite their much greater routine and experience, were confused, and despite their superior strength, Perczel seized the initiative. However, the battle itself did not quite go according to the plan, and Perczel, precisely because of his lack of routine and experience, did not succeed in asserting his numerical superiority.

He spent the next month organizing and increasing his army. It organized new battalions from the recruits from Vas, Zala and Somogy counties. Perczel's troops crossed the Mura several times, and each time he managed to surprise the commanders of the opposing forces. At the end of November, he ordered his artillery to shoot the Croatian positions from Légrád, to which not only the Croatian army but also a large part of the Styrian army rushed to this threatened point. In mid-December, Perczel prepared to invade Muraköz again but was prevented from doing so by the attack of the K.u.K. army.

== Sources ==
- Bóna, Gábor (1987). Tábornokok és törzstisztek a szabadságharcban 1848–49 ("Generals and Staff Officers in the War of Freedom 1848–1849") (in Hungarian). Budapest: Zrínyi Katonai Kiadó. p. 430. ISBN 963-326-343-3.
- Hermann, Róbert (2001), 1848-1849 a szabadságharc hadtörténete ("Military History of 1848-1849") (in Hungarian), Budapest: Korona, ISBN 963-9376-21-3
- Hermann, Róbert (2004). Az 1848–1849-es szabadságharc nagy csatái ("Great battles of the Hungarian War of Independence of 1848–1849") (in Hungarian). Budapest: Zrínyi. p. 408. ISBN 963-327-367-6.
- Hermann, Róbert (1998), "Perczel Mór fegyverszüneti tárgyalásai 1848. október végén ("Mór Perczel's Cease-Fire Negotiations on End of October 1848")", Aetas (13) 2. pp. 74-106 (in Hungarian)
- Schmidt-Brentano, Antonio (2007). Die k. k. bzw. k. u. k. Generalität 1816-1918 ("Officers of the K.K and K.u.K. Army") (in German). Budapest: Österreichisches Staatsarchiv. p. 211.
