= Battle of Kotor =

Battle during Hungarian Revolution of 1848

Coordinates: 46°22′20.8″N 16°50′04.2″E

- Part of the Hungarian Revolution of 1848
Date	17 October 1848
Location	Kotor, Zala County, Kingdom of Hungary, today part of Međimurje County Croatia
Result	Hungarian victory

Belligerents
Hungarian Revolutionary Army	Austrian Empire: Kingdom of Croatia

Commanders and leaders
András Gáspár; Mór Perczel	Georg Bornemissza †

Strength
1,526+? men 297 horses 6 cannons	~1,900 men 1 cannon

Casualties and losses
3 dead 4 wounded	100 + ? dead or wounded 200 captured

The Battle of Kotor took place during the Hungarian War of Independence of 1848-1849 on 17 October 1848 between the Hungarian Revolutionary Army under the command of Major András Gáspár and the Croatian troops under Colonel Captain Georg Bornemissza, defending the Muraköz/Međimurje region. Mór Perczel, the leader of the Hungarian brigade which attacked Muraköz, split his troops in two, and while his detachment defeated the Croatian troops defending the line of the Mura River in the Battle of Letenye, the other column defeated the Croatians at Kotor. As a result of these victories, Perczel's troops liberated Muraköz.

== Background ==
On 16 October General Mór Perczel concentrated his troops at Nagykanizsa, to start the operation to liberate Muraköz (the region between the Drava and the Mura rivers, today part of Croatia, called Međimurje County) from the Croatian occupation.

Perczel divided his troops into two columns. The column he led was made up of the Hunyadi troop, the volunteers from Szabolcs and Zala counties, the national guards from Nagykanizsa, from the Alexander and Nicholas Hussars a company each, and the newly formed 6-pounder battery (with eight guns). This crossed the Mura at Letenye. Perczel's column marched through Kiskanizsa, Becsehely, and Pola to Letenye, where they entered in a fight with the Croatian troops, defending the line of the Mura river, in order to break in Muraköz.

== Prelude ==
The other column was led by András Gáspár, who was promoted to major after the success at Ozora. The infantry of this column consisted of the Zrínyi troop, the volunteers from Sopron, the Somogy and the Szepetnek national guards led by Királyi Pál, the cavalry of one company of Nicholas Hussars, and the artillery of 6 guns.

== Battle ==
The column led by Gáspár arrived on the banks of the Mura at 10 am on 17 October. After the artillerymen of Kassa had fired eight cannon shots at the enemy, the cavalry and the Zrínyi troop pushed all the way to the riverbank.

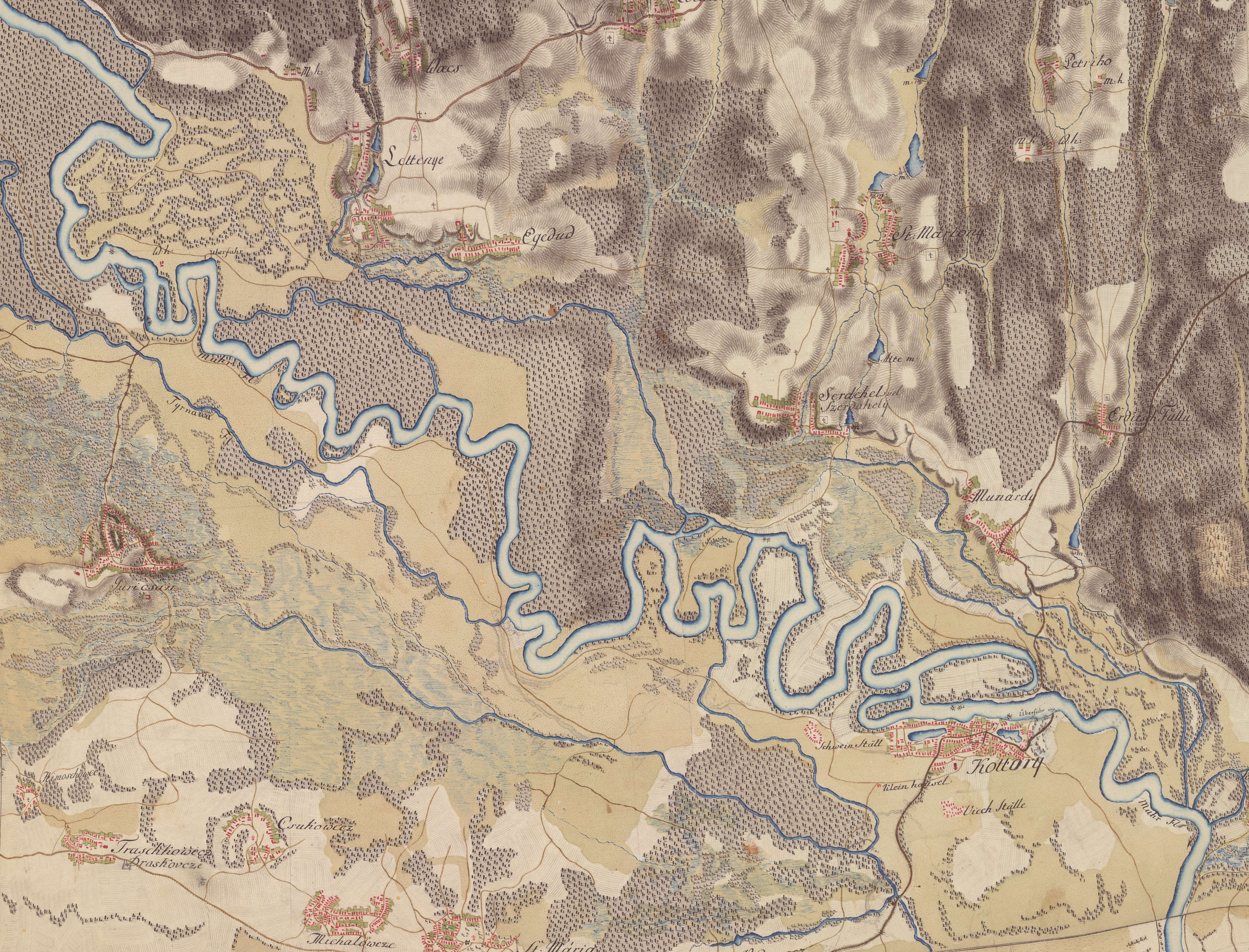
The Mura river between Letenye and Kotor at the end of the 18th century

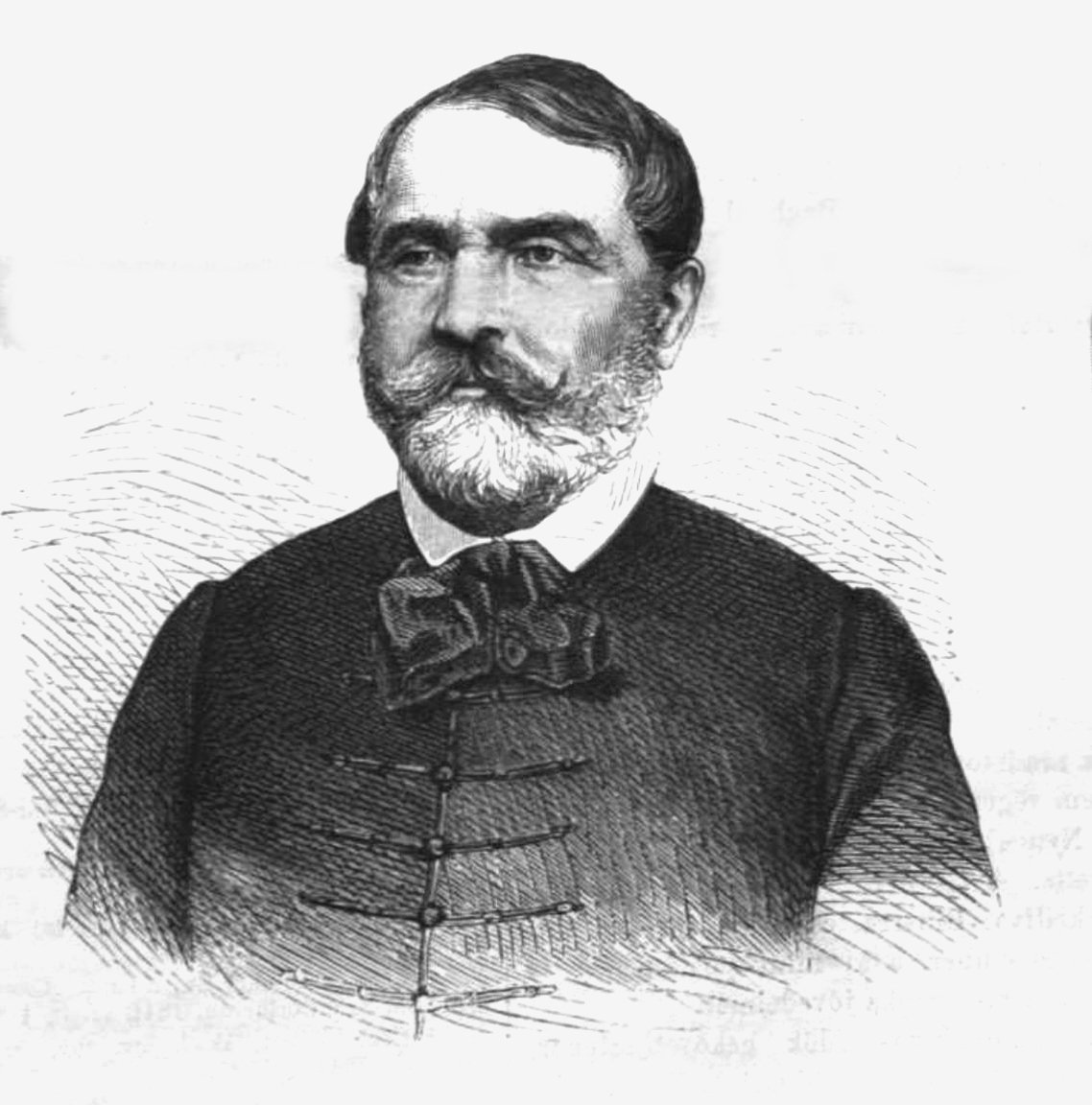
András Gáspár

The enemy soon withdrew from the riverbank. A Croatian miller from Molnári, Márton Bedenik, swam across to the other shore, tied up the ferry, and returned with it to the left bank. Gáspár first moved the Zrínyi troop, then the Nicholas hussars across the river. Here a two-pounder gun was found in the sandhills abandoned by the enemy. Gáspár put his troops in battle formation, and then marched towards the village of Domború, where the enemy retreated. With artillery and hussars, Gáspár entered the village, which the enemy had not yet left. On a street in the village, Gáspár saw two Croatian border guard officers in red caps, and he ordered the hussars to chase him. The two officers were able to escape, but the Hussars ran into a Croatian unit. The Croats met the hussars with skirmisher fire, as a result of which the hussars retreated, losing two wounded riders. Faced with the attacking Croats, the Hungarian artillerymen had only enough time to fire once, and then they too began to flee. Gáspár then sent forward the 2nd, 3rd, and 6th companies of the Zrínyi troop, who were joined by the volunteer jägers from Sopron. In the meantime, the Hungarian artillery broke up the Croatian troops deployed in front of the village with grapeshot. Then the Hungarian infantry attacked, followed by the Nicholas hussars, entering the village. In the fight, the Sopron jägers shot the Croatian commander, Captain Bornemissza who was of Hungarian origin. Among the fleeing Croats, the Hungarian hussars wreaked havoc. The Croats lost nearly 100 dead and wounded and 200 prisoners. The Croatian force, consisting mainly of national guardsmen, estimated by Gáspár at around 1,900, fled in disarray towards Légrad and Varaždin. According to Perczel's memoirs, during the crossing two ferries sank due to overloading, and a part of those on board was lost in the Drava.

== Aftermath ==
After the battle, Gáspár pushed forward to Szentmária, and from there he reported to Perczel what had happened. On the morning of the 18th, at Domború, he fired at the enemy with the two-pounder gun left behind by the Croats at Kottori, but the Croats on the other side of the river returned fire with four guns, making Gáspár retreat from the bank of the Drava.

The Croats retreated to Légrád and Varazdin. The bridge at Varaždin was dismantled in one section and they camped opposite the bridge. Perczel did not have the means to cross the river, but his attack still caused great panic. Lieutenant-General Dahlen reported that 10,000–12,000 Hungarian "insurgents" had pushed into Muraköz at Letenye, and another column had crossed the Mura at Kottori.

Perczel too defeated the Croats in the Battle of Letenye, and occupied Csáktornya, completing the liberation of Muraköz. Perczel himself was surprised at how quickly the Croats had evacuated what he knew to be a very fortified Csáktornya. He believed that the Croats could have built Muraköz into a fortified camp, like Szenttamás if his army had not arrived in time and had not recaptured it by an army of many thousands. Arriving at Csáktorna, his original intention was to gather strength and advance as far as Varazdin and take possession of the Drava bridge.

== Sources ==
- Bóna, Gábor (1987). Tábornokok és törzstisztek a szabadságharcban 1848–49 ("Generals and Staff Officers in the War of Freedom 1848–1849") (in Hungarian). Budapest: Zrínyi Katonai Kiadó. p. 430. ISBN 963-326-343-3.
- Hermann, Róbert (2001), 1848-1849 a szabadságharc hadtörténete ("Military History of 1848-1849") (in Hungarian), Budapest: Korona, ISBN 963-9376-21-3
- Hermann, Róbert (2004). Az 1848–1849-es szabadságharc nagy csatái ("Great battles of the Hungarian War of Independence of 1848–1849") (in Hungarian). Budapest: Zrínyi. p. 408. ISBN 963-327-367-6.
- Hermann, Róbert (1997), "Kanizsa felszabadítása 1848. október 3-án ("The Liberation of Kanizsa on 3 October 1848")" (PDF), Zalai Múzeum 07 (in Hungarian)
- Hermann, Róbert (1998), "Perczel Mór fegyverszüneti tárgyalásai 1848. október végén ("Mór Perczel's Cease-Fire Negotiations on End of October 1848")", Aetas (13) 2. pp. 74-106 (in Hungarian)
- Schmidt-Brentano, Antonio (2007). Die k. k. bzw. k. u. k. Generalität 1816-1918 ("Officers of the K.K and K.u.K. Army") (in German). Budapest: Österreichisches Staatsarchiv. p. 211.
