= Jakob Aleksič =

Slovenian theologian

- Born: May 30, 1897; Obrež, Slovenia
- Died: October 2, 1980 (aged 83); Ljubljana
- Occupation: Theologian

Jakob Aleksič (Obrež, Slovenia, 30 May 1897 – 2 October 1980, Ljubljana) was a Slovenian theologian.

He was professor at the high school for theology in Maribor. From 1947 to 1980 he was professor at the Faculty of Theology in Ljubljana. He studied the Bible and its history.

== Works ==
- Kristus in njegovo kraljestvo (Christ and His Kingdom, 1961)
- 4. prevod Svetega pisma (Fourth Translation of the Holy Bible, 1961)
- Malo sveto pismo (Little Holy Bible, 1967)
