= Municipality of Središče ob Dravi =

Municipality of Slovenia

Municipality of Središče ob Dravi Občina Središče ob Dravi
- Municipality
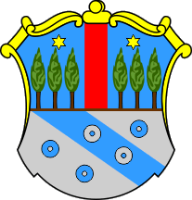
- Coat of arms

- Location of the Municipality of Središče ob Dravi in Slovenia
- Coordinates: 46°24′N 16°16′E
- Country: Slovenia

Government
  - Mayor: Toni Jelovica

Area
  - Total: 32.7 km^{2} (12.6 sq mi)

Population (July 1, 2018)
  - Total: 1,970
  - Density: 60.2/km^{2} (156/sq mi)
- Time zone: UTC+01 (CET)
  - Summer (DST): UTC+02 (CEST)
- Website: www.sredisce-ob-dravi.si

The Municipality of Središče ob Dravi (pronounced [sɾɛˈdiːʃtʃɛ ɔb ˈdɾaːʋi]; Slovene: Občina Središče ob Dravi) is a municipality in the traditional region of Styria in northeastern Slovenia. The seat of the municipality is the town of Središče ob Dravi. Središče ob Dravi became a municipality in 2006. It borders Croatia.

== Settlements ==
In addition to the municipal seat of Središče ob Dravi, the municipality also includes the following settlements:

- Godeninci
- Grabe
- Obrež
- Šalovci
