= Šalovci, Središče ob Dravi =

Šalovci
- Location in Slovenia
- Coordinates: 46°25′19.42″N 16°13′26.39″E
- Country: Slovenia
- Traditional region: Styria
- Statistical region: Drava
- Municipality: Središče ob Dravi

Area
  - Total: 5.84 km^{2} (2.25 sq mi)
- Elevation: 213.4 m (700 ft)

Population (2002)
  - Total: 217

Šalovci (pronounced [ˈʃaːlɔu̯tsi]; German: Schalofzen) is a settlement in the Municipality of Središče ob Dravi in northeastern Slovenia. The area belongs to the traditional region of Styria and is now included in the Drava Statistical Region.
