= Grabe, Središče ob Dravi =

Grabe
- Location in Slovenia
- Coordinates: 46°23′53″N 16°15′20.09″E
- Country: Slovenia
- Traditional region: Styria
- Statistical region: Drava
- Municipality: Središče ob Dravi

Area
  - Total: 5.23 km^{2} (2.02 sq mi)
- Elevation: 190.8 m (626 ft)

Population (2002)
  - Total: 154

Grabe (pronounced [ˈɡɾaːbɛ]; German: Grabendorf) is a settlement on the left bank of the Drava River in the Municipality of Središče ob Dravi in northeastern Slovenia. The area belongs to the traditional region of Styria and is now included in the Drava Statistical Region.

The Središče ob Dravi parish church is located in the settlement. It is dedicated to the Holy Spirit and belongs to the Roman Catholic Archdiocese of Maribor. The building dates to the 16th century and the exterior was renovated in 1908.
