= Godeninci =

- Location in Slovenia
- Coordinates: 46°25′24.64″N 16°15′52.17″E
- Country: Slovenia
- Traditional region: Styria
- Statistical region: Drava
- Municipality: Središče ob Dravi

Area
  - Total: 2.25 km^{2} (0.87 sq mi)
- Elevation: 207.2 m (680 ft)

Population (2002)
  - Total: 182

Godeninci (pronounced [ɡɔdɛˈniːntsi]; German: Godeninzen) is a settlement in the Municipality of Središče ob Dravi in northeastern Slovenia, right on the border with Croatia. The area belongs to the traditional region of Styria and is now included in the Drava Statistical Region.
