= Središče ob Dravi =

Locality of Slovenia

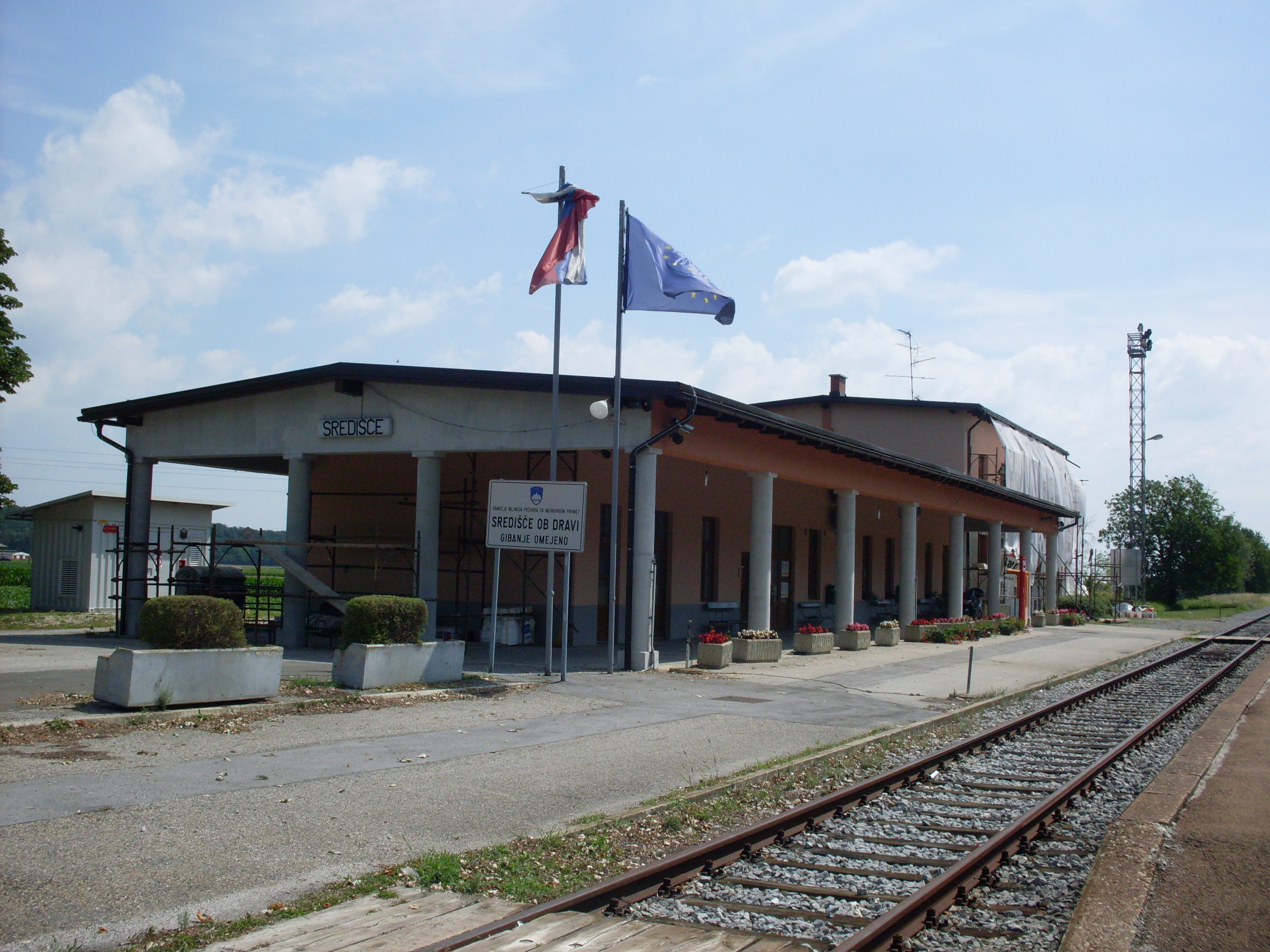
- Središče ob Dravi train station

- Location in Slovenia
- Coordinates: 46°23′36″N 16°16′20″E
- Country: Slovenia
- Traditional region: Styria
- Statistical region: Drava
- Municipality: Središče ob Dravi

Area
  - Total: 11.46 km^{2} (4.42 sq mi)
- Elevation: 183.2 m (601 ft)

Population (2021)
  - Total: 984
  - Density: 85.9/km^{2} (222/sq mi)

Središče ob Dravi (pronounced [sɾɛˈdiːʃtʃɛ ɔb ˈdɾaːʋi], German: Polstrau) is a town in northeastern Slovenia. It is the seat of the Municipality of Središče ob Dravi. It lies on the left bank of the Drava River and borders Croatia.

The parish church of Središče ob Dravi is in the neighbouring village of Grabe. The church in the actual settlement of Središče ob Dravi is a chapel of ease and is dedicated to Mary of the Seven Sorrows. It was built in 1637. In the 18th century the nave was vaulted.
