= Zalasárszeg =

Coordinates: 46°30′N 17°05′E

- Village
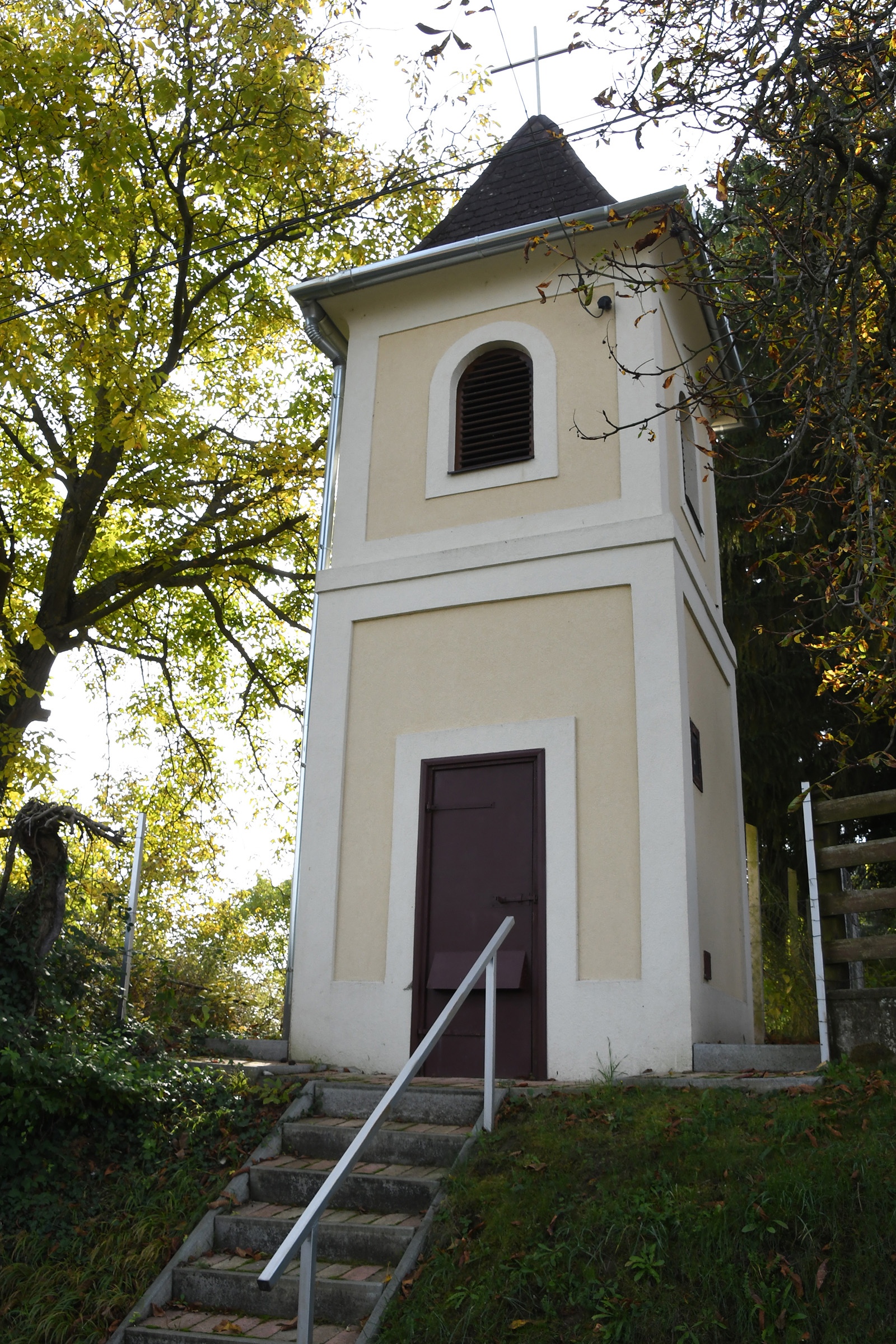
- Roman Catholic bell tower in Zalasárszeg, Hungary
- Interactive map of Zalasárszeg
- Country: Hungary
- Region: Western Transdanubia
- County: Zala County
- Time zone: UTC+1 (CET)
  - Summer (DST): UTC+2 (CEST)
- Motorways: M7
- Distance from Budapest: 201 km (125 mi) Northeast

Zalasárszeg is a village in Zala County, Hungary.
