= Odranski Obrež =

- Village
- Interactive map of Odranski Obrež
- Location within Croatia
- Coordinates: 45.715978°N 15.941784°E
- Country: Croatia
- County: City of Zagreb
- City District: Brezovica

Area
  - Total: 4.2 sq mi (10.9 km^{2})

Population (2021)
  - Total: 1,503
  - Density: 357/sq mi (138/km^{2})
- Time zone: UTC+1 (CET)
  - Summer (DST): UTC+2 (CEST)

Odranski Obrež is a village in Central Croatia, located south of Zagreb.

== Demographics ==
According to the 2021 census, its population was 1,503. According to the 2011 census, it had 1,578 inhabitants.
