= Mali Obrež =

- Location in Slovenia
- Coordinates: 45°54′30.82″N 15°39′30.67″E
- Country: Slovenia
- Traditional region: Styria
- Statistical region: Lower Sava
- Municipality: Brežice

Area
  - Total: 1.08 km^{2} (0.42 sq mi)
- Elevation: 157.8 m (518 ft)

Population (2020)
  - Total: 125
  - Density: 116/km^{2} (300/sq mi)

Mali Obrež (pronounced [ˈmaːli ɔˈbɾeːʃ]; German: Kleinobresch) is a settlement in the Municipality of Brežice in eastern Slovenia. It lies along the road from Dobova to Bizeljsko, just north of Dobova. The area is part of the traditional region of Styria. It is now included in the Lower Sava Statistical Region. The Jovsi wetland lies east of the village.
