= Obrež, Središče ob Dravi =

Obrež
- Location in Slovenia
- Coordinates: 46°23′52.27″N 16°14′28.57″E
- Country: Slovenia
- Traditional region: Styria
- Statistical region: Drava
- Municipality: Središče ob Dravi

Area
  - Total: 8.02 km^{2} (3.10 sq mi)
- Elevation: 185.8 m (610 ft)

Population (2002)
  - Total: 520

Obrež (pronounced [ˈoːbɾɛʃ]; in older sources Obrežje, German: Obrisch) is a settlement on the left bank of the Drava River in the Municipality of Središče ob Dravi in northeastern Slovenia. The area belongs to the traditional region of Styria and is now included in the Drava Statistical Region.

== Notable residents ==
- Jakob Aleksič (1897–1980), theologian
