= Veliki Obrež =

- Location in Slovenia
- Coordinates: 45°54′11.82″N 15°40′6.17″E
- Country: Slovenia
- Traditional region: Styria
- Statistical region: Lower Sava
- Municipality: Brežice

Area
  - Total: 3.61 km^{2} (1.39 sq mi)
- Elevation: 155.9 m (511 ft)

Population (2020)
  - Total: 290
  - Density: 80/km^{2} (210/sq mi)

Veliki Obrež (pronounced [ˈʋeːliki ɔˈbɾeːʃ], German: Großobresch) is a settlement on the right bank of the Sotla River in the Municipality of Brežice in eastern Slovenia, close to the border with Croatia. The area is part of the traditional region of Styria. It is now included with the rest of the municipality in the Lower Sava Statistical Region. The Jovsi wetland lies north of the village.
