= Obrež, Varvarin =

Coordinates: 43.7692°N 21.3494°E

Obrež
- Village
- Interactive map of Obrež
- Elevation: 128 m (420 ft)

Population
  - Total: 3,879
- Time zone: UTC+1 (UTC)
- Postal code: 37266

Obrež (Serbian Cyrillic: Обреж) is a village in Serbia. It is situated in the Varvarin municipality, in the Rasina District. The village has a Serb ethnic majority and its population numbering 3,879 people (2002 census).

== See also ==
- List of places in Serbia
