= Becsehely =

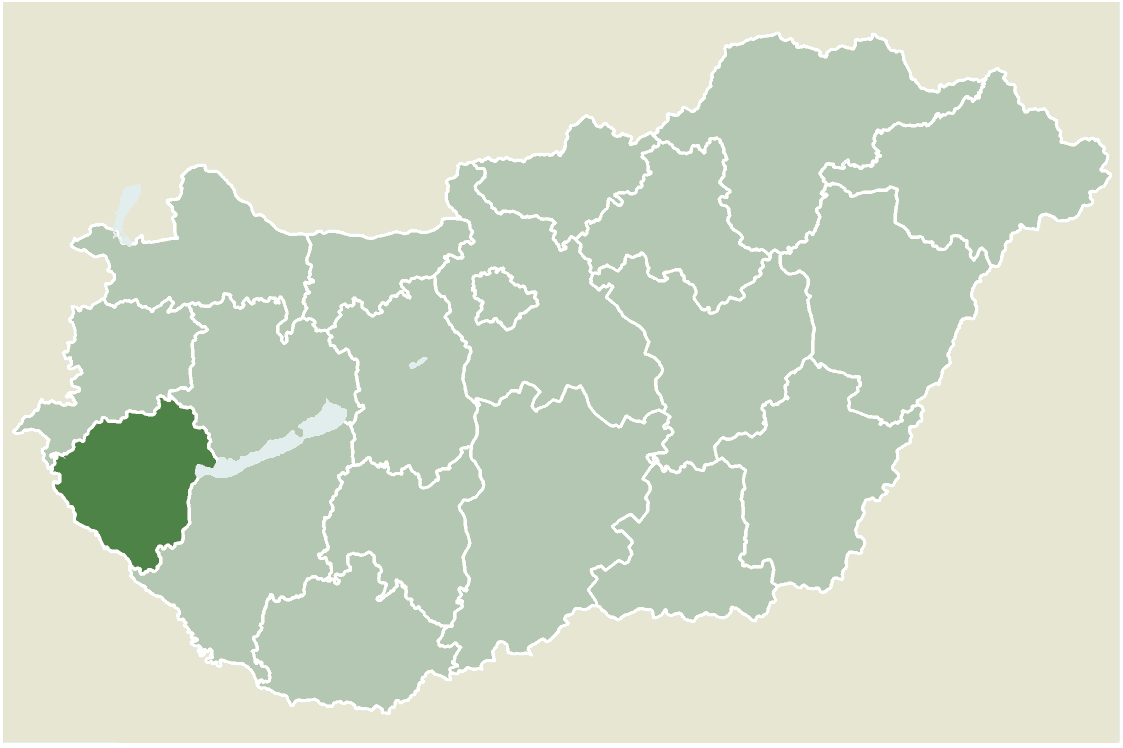
- Location of Zala county in Hungary

- Location of Becsehely
- Coordinates: 46.44595°N 16.78713°E
- Country: Hungary
- County: Zala

Area
  - Total: 36.13 km^{2} (13.95 sq mi)

Population (2004)
  - Total: 2,279
  - Density: 63.07/km^{2} (163.4/sq mi)
- Time zone: UTC+1 (CET)
  - Summer (DST): UTC+2 (CEST)
- Postal code: 8866
- Area code: 93
- Motorways: M7
- Distance from Budapest: 227 km (141 mi) Northeast

Becsehely (Croatian: Bečehel) is a village in Zala County, Hungary.
