= András Gáspár (general) =

Hungarian general (1804–1884)

- Gáspár András
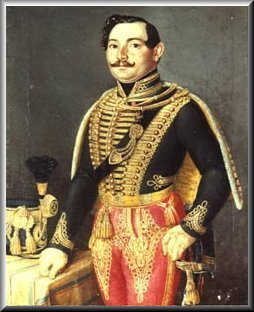
- Born: 23 November 1804; Kecskemét, Kingdom of Hungary, Habsburg monarchy
- Died: 5 August 1884 (aged 79); Bihar, Austria-Hungary
- Military career
- Allegiance: (by 1848) Austrian Empire; (1848–9) Hungarian Revolutionary Army
- Branch: Army
- Service years: 1821–1849
- Rank: General
- Commands: VIIth Army Corps (1849)
- Hungarian Revolution and War of Freedom of 1848: Battle of Hatvan; Battle of Isaszeg; Battle of Nagysalló

András Gáspár (23 November 1804 – 5 August 1884) was a Hungarian general who fought in the Hungarian War of Independence of 1848–1849.

He was born in a poor bourgeois family. His father was a bootmaker. He finished grammar school in his hometown. From 1821 he is ranker, in 1847 is chief captain in the IXth Hussar regiment.

From September 1848 he participated in the fights against Josip Jelačić. From 8 (16) October he was major, division commander in the regiments which joined the Hungarian side. From 26 November 1848 he was the commander of the IX. Hussar Regiment. From 5 January 1849 he was brigadier, from 18 February commander of a division in the Army of the Northern Danube led by Artúr Görgei. For his victory in the Battle of Hatvan, he received the title of general and the III. Class Hungarian Military Decoration.

His decision not to attack with his army corps the Austrians led by Marshall Alfred I, Prince of Windisch-Grätz in the Battle of Isaszeg, was considered to be a big mistake, because it could have led the destruction of the united Habsburg forces in Hungary thus immediately ending the war. Two weeks later he took an important role in the victory in the Battle of Nagysalló.

On 24 April 1849, citing his illness, he requested his release, and did not participate in further battles. The reason for his resignation, in addition to his opposition to the declaration of independence, may have been that after the Battle of Isaszeg, the confidence of the military leadership in his commanding abilities was shaken.

After Hungary's Surrender at Világos in front of the Russian troops, and the end of the Hungarian War of Independence, he was sentenced to 10 years in prison by the Austrian authorities, but in 1850 he was pardoned. He became postmaster in Bihar. Between 1868–1875 he was a parliamentarian in the House of Representatives, then he was elected as president of the Central Honvéd Association.

== Sources ==
- Bóna, Gábor (1987). Tábornokok és törzstisztek a szabadságharcban 1848–49 ("Generals and Staff Officers in the War of Independence 1848–1849") (in Hungarian). Budapest: Zrínyi Katonai Kiadó. p. 430. ISBN 963-326-343-3.
- Hermann, Róbert (2004). Az 1848–1849-es szabadságharc nagy csatái ("Great battles of the Hungarian War of Independence 1848–1849") (in Hungarian). Budapest: Zrínyi. p. 408. ISBN 963-327-367-6.
