= Szepetnek =

- Coat of arms

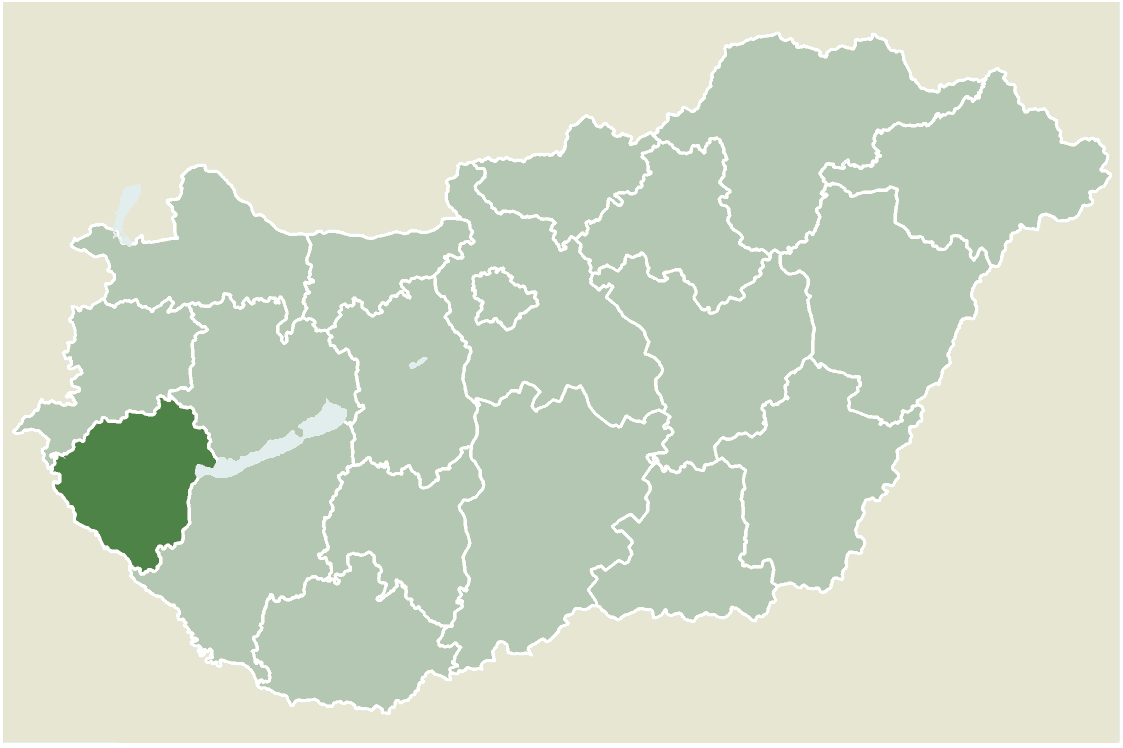
- Location of Zala county in Hungary

- Location of Szepetnek
- Coordinates: 46.43306°N 16.89787°E
- Country: Hungary
- County: Zala

Area
  - Total: 30.39 km^{2} (11.73 sq mi)

Population (2004)
  - Total: 1,777
  - Density: 58.47/km^{2} (151.4/sq mi)
- Time zone: UTC+1 (CET)
  - Summer (DST): UTC+2 (CEST)
- Postal code: 8861
- Area code: 93

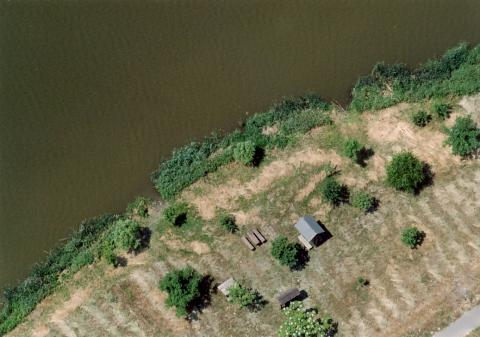
Szepetnek, reservoir from above

Szepetnek (German: Sepetnek, Croatian: Sepetnik) is a village in Zala County, Hungary with a population of less than 1800.
