= Tóth =

Hungarian surname

Tóth, Tót or Toth is a Hungarian ethnonymic surname that was an older term related to the "Tótok" meaning Slavs (of Slavonia i.e. Croats, also Slovenes and Slovaks). "Toth" may also be a surname of German origin.

Tót has also been a more general Slavic reference, per toponyms like Tótszerdahely and Tótszentmárton on the southern border of Hungary.

Tóth is among the top three most frequent surnames in Hungary.

== People with the surname ==
Notable people with the name include:

== A ==
- Ádám Tóth (born 1985), Hungarian figure skater
- Ádám Tóth (handballer) (born 1995), Hungarian handball player
- Adrienn Tóth (born 1990), Hungarian modern pentathlete
- Ágota Lykovcán (born 1987; née Tóth), Hungarian speed skater
- Aladár Tóth (1898–1968), Hungarian music manager
- Alex Toth (1928–2006), American cartoonist
- Alexander Tóth (born 2001), Slovak footballer
- Alexandra Tóth, multiple people
- Saint Alexis Toth (1853–1909), Slovak priest of the Russian Orthodox church who served in the United States
- Amarissa Tóth (born 2003), Hungarian tennis player
- Amerigo Tot (1909–1984; born Imre Tóth), Hungarian sculptor
- Andi Tóth (born 1999), Hungarian actress and singer
- Andor Toth (1925–2006), American classical violinist and conductor, member of Toth Duo, father of Andor Toth Jr.
- Andor Toth Jr. (1948–2002), American cellist, member of Toth Duo
- András Tóth, multiple people
- Andre de Toth (1913–2002), Hungarian-American filmmaker
- Andrea Tóth (born 1980), Hungarian water polo player
- Andrew Toth, U.S. Air Force general
- Anita Tóth (born 1979), Hungarian sport shooter
- Ann Toth (1922–1991), American actress
- Anna Tóth (born 2003), Hungarian hurdler
- Annamária Tóth (1945–2023), Hungarian athletics competitor
- Anne Toth, American business executive
- Árpád Tóth (1886–1928), Hungarian poet
- Attila Tóth (born 1965), Hungarian figure skater

== B ==
- Balázs Tóth, multiple people
- Bálint Tóth (born 1955), Hungarian mathematician
- Barnabás Tóth (born 1994), Hungarian footballer
- Beatrix Tóth (born 1967), Hungarian handball player
- Béla Tóth, Hungarian football manager
- Bela Tóth (chess player) (born 1943), Hungarian and Italian chess master
- Bence Tóth, multiple people
- Bertalan Tóth (born 1975), Hungarian lawyer and politician
- Borbála Tóth Harsányi (born 1946), Hungarian handball player, sister of Katalin Laki
- Borisz Tóth (born 2002), Hungarian footballer
- Brett Toth (born 1996), American football player

== C ==
- Celina Toth (born 1992), Canadian diver
- Charles Toth (1879-?), American long-distance swimmer
- Claudia Toth Fischer (born 1981), Austrian curler
- Csaba Tóth (born 1960), Hungarian politician
- Csaba Tóth (racing driver) (born 1967), Hungarian racing driver
- Cynthia Ann Toth, American ophthalmologist and professor

== D ==
- Daniel Toth (born 1987), Austrian footballer
- Dávid Tóth (born 1985), Hungarian canoer
- Dominik Tóth (1925–2015), Slovak catholic priest
- Don Toth (born 1948), Canadian politician
- Dušan Tóth (born 1971), Slovak football manager and former player

== E ==
- Ed Toth, American drummer
- Ede Tóth (1884–1943), Hungarian tennis player
- Edina Tóth (born 1975), Hungarian politician
- Edra Toth (born 1952), Hungarian-American ballet dancer
- Elizabeth Toth, American academic
- Emily Toth, American scholar, novelist, advice columnist, and feminist activist
- Eric Justin Toth (born 1982), American convict
- Eszter Tóth (born 1992), Hungarian handball player
- Éva Tóth (1952–2013), Hungarian sprinter

== F ==
- Ferenc Tóth, multiple people
- Frank Tóth (born 1970), Hungarian water polo player

== G ==
- Gabi Tóth (born 1988), Hungarian singer
- Gábor Tóth, multiple people
- Gabriella Tóth, multiple people
- Georgina Toth (born 1982), Hungarian-Cameroonian thrower
- Gergely Tóth (born 1966), Hungarian theoretical chemist
- Géza Tóth, multiple people
- Gwendolyn Toth (born 1955), American early music artist
- György Tóth (1915–1994), Hungarian football player and manager
- Gyula Tóth, multiple people

== H ==
- Hajnalka Tóth (born 1976), Hungarian fencer

== I ==
- Ildikó Tóth, multiple people
- Ilona Tóth (1932–1957), Hungarian medical student and revolutionary
- Imre Tóth, multiple people
- István Tóth, multiple people
- Iván Tóth (born 1971), Hungarian footballer
- Ivan Toth Depeña (born 1972), American artist
- Ivett Tóth (born 1998), Hungarian figure skater

== J ==
- János Tóth, multiple people
- Jennifer Toth (1967–2025), American journalist and writer
- Jerry Toth (1928–1999), Canadian composer and woodwind player
- Jon Toth (born 1994), American football player
- Joseph L. Toth (born 1973), American judge
- József Tóth, multiple people
- Judit Tóth (1906–1993), Hungarian gymnast
- Judith C. Toth (born 1937), American politician
- Juraj Tóth (born 1975), Slovak astronomer

== K ==
- Kaleb Toth (born 1977), Canadian lacrosse player
- Kálmán Tóth, multiple people
- Karina Toth (born 1983), Austrian curler
- Karlo Toth (1907–1988), Yugoslav wrestler
- Katalin Laki (born 1948; née Tóth Harsányi), Hungarian handball player
- Katalin Tóth (born 1984), Hungarian handball player
- Kevin Toth (born 1967), American shot putter
- Krisztián Tóth (born 1994), Hungarian judoka
- Krisztina Tóth, multiple people

== L ==
- Lajos Tóth (1914–1984), Hungarian gymnast
- Lajos Tóth (fighter pilot) (1922–1951), Hungarian fighter pilot
- László Tahi Tóth (1944–2018), Hungarian actor
- László Toroczkai (born 1978; born László Tóth), Hungarian politician
- László Tóth, Laszlo Toth or Lazlo Toth, multiple people
- Les Toth (born 1952), Australian actor and DJ
- Lívia Tóth (born 1980), Hungarian runner
- Lucio Toth (1934–2017), Italian politician

== M ==
- Marcel Toth (born 1989), Austrian footballer
- Margit Tóth (1961–2016), Hungarian gymnast
- Marijo Tot (born 1972), Croatian football manager
- Mário Tóth (born 1995), Slovak footballer
- Martin Tóth (born 1986), Slovak footballer
- Márton Tóth, Hungarian sprint canoer
- Máté Tóth, multiple people
- Matej Tóth (born 1983), Slovak race walker
- Mátyás Tóth (1918–2002), Hungarian–Romanian footballer
- Mihály Tóth, multiple people
- Mike Toth (born 1963), Canadian sports anchor
- Mikuláš Tóth, multiple people
- Miroslav Tóth (born 1978), Slovak footballer
- Monica Toth (born 1970), Romanian triple jumper

== N ==
- Noémi Orvos-Tóth (born 1971), Hungarian psychologist and author
- Nicholas Toth (born 1952), American archaeologist
- Norbert Tóth, multiple people
- Noémi Tóth (born 1976), Italian water polo player

== O ==
- Orsolya Tóth (born 1981), Hungarian actress

== P ==
- Paolo Toth (born 1941), Italian computer scientist and engineer
- Paul A. Toth (born 1964), American writer
- Paul Toth (1935–1999), American baseball player
- Péter Tóth, multiple people

== R ==
- Rudy Toth (1925–2009), Slovak-Canadian composer, arranger, conductor, pianist, and cimbalom player

== S ==
- Sándor Tóth (1939–2019), Hungarian journalist and politician
- Sára Tóth (born 1993), Hungarian handball player
- Sheree Toth, American professor at the University of Rochester
- Steve Toth (born 1960), American politician
- Susan Toth (died 2020), wife of American writer Harlan Ellison
- Szilárd Tóth (born 1973), Hungarian figure skater

== T ==
- Taylor Toth (born 1989), American figure skater
- Tamás Tóth, multiple people
- Thomas Toth, Canadian long-distance runner
- Tiah Toth (born 1993), Australian rules footballer
- Tiffany Toth, Playboy Playmate of the Month in September 2011
- Tímea Tóth (born 1980), Hungarian handballer
- Timea Toth (swimmer) (born 1968), Israeli retired Olympic swimmer
- Tom Toth (born 1962), American football player

== V ==
- Viktor Tóth (born 1977), Hungarian saxophonist
- Viktoria Orsi Toth (born 1990), Italian beach volleyball player
- Vilmos Tóth (1832–1898), Hungarian politician
- Vojtech Tóth (born 1938), Slovak wrestler

== W ==
- Wooden Wand, American singer, born James Jackson Toth

== Z ==
- Zollie Toth (1924–2018), American football player
- Zoltán Tóth, multiple people
- Zsófia Tóth (born 1989), Hungarian triathlete
- Zsófia Tóth (ice hockey) (born 2003), Hungarian ice hockey player
- Zvi Yanai (1935–2013; born Sandro Toth), Israeli civil servant and author

== See also ==
- Thoth
