= List of equestrian statues in Hungary =

This is a list of equestrian statues in Hungary.

== Budapest ==
- Millenniumi emlékmű (Millennium Monument) by Zala György at the Hősök tere (Heroes' Square) with seven equestrians of the seven Magyar tribes leaders: Árpád, Előd, Ond, Kond, Tas, Huba, and Töhötöm (Tétény), 1894-1929.
- Equestrian of King Stephen I by Alajos Stróbl in the Fischer Bastion, 1906.
- Equestrian of Prince Rákóczi Ferenc II.
- Equestrian of Artúr Görgey.
- Equestrian of Prince Savoyai Jenő by József Róna in the Buda Castle, 1900.
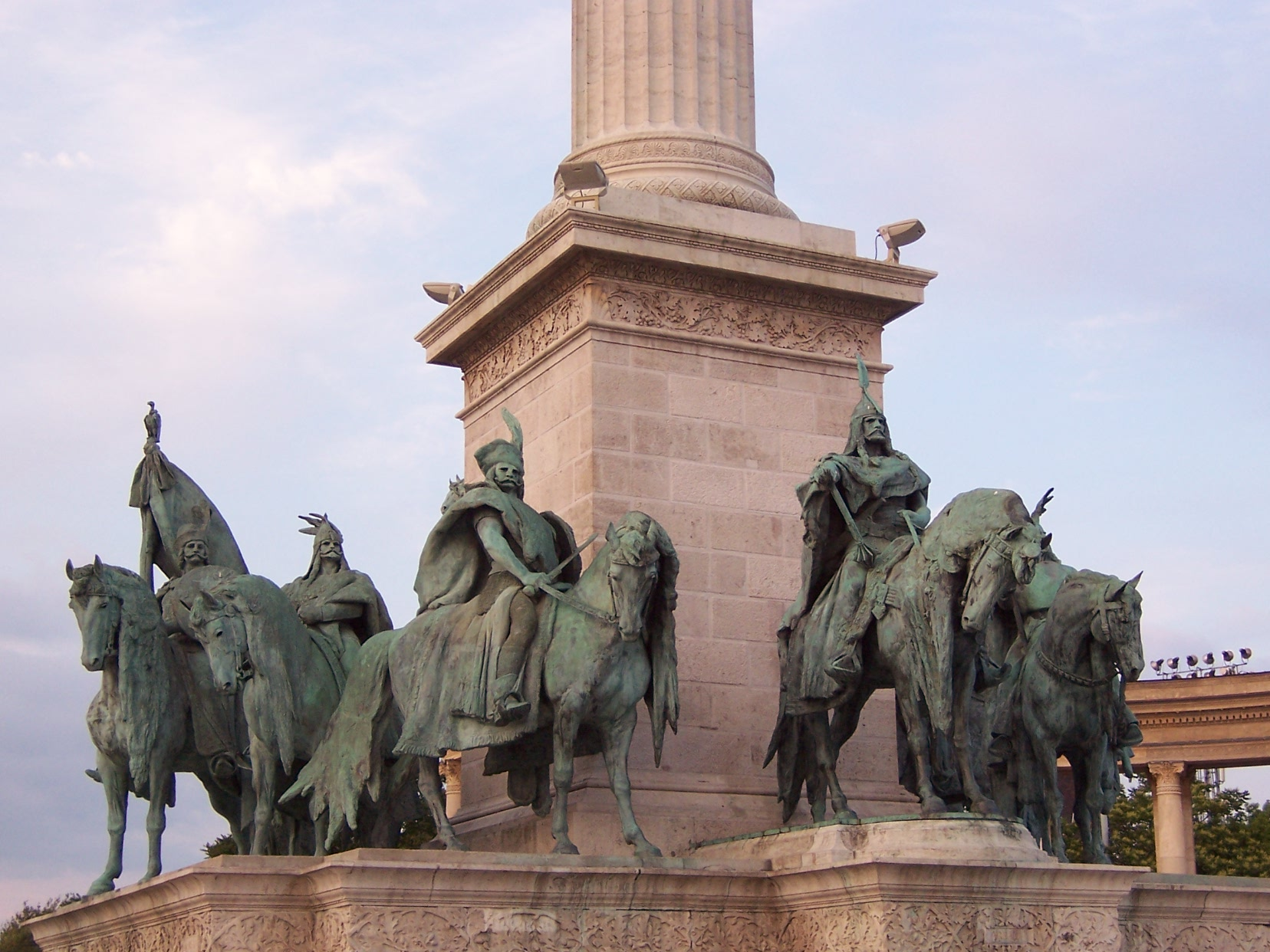
Millennium Monument in Budapest

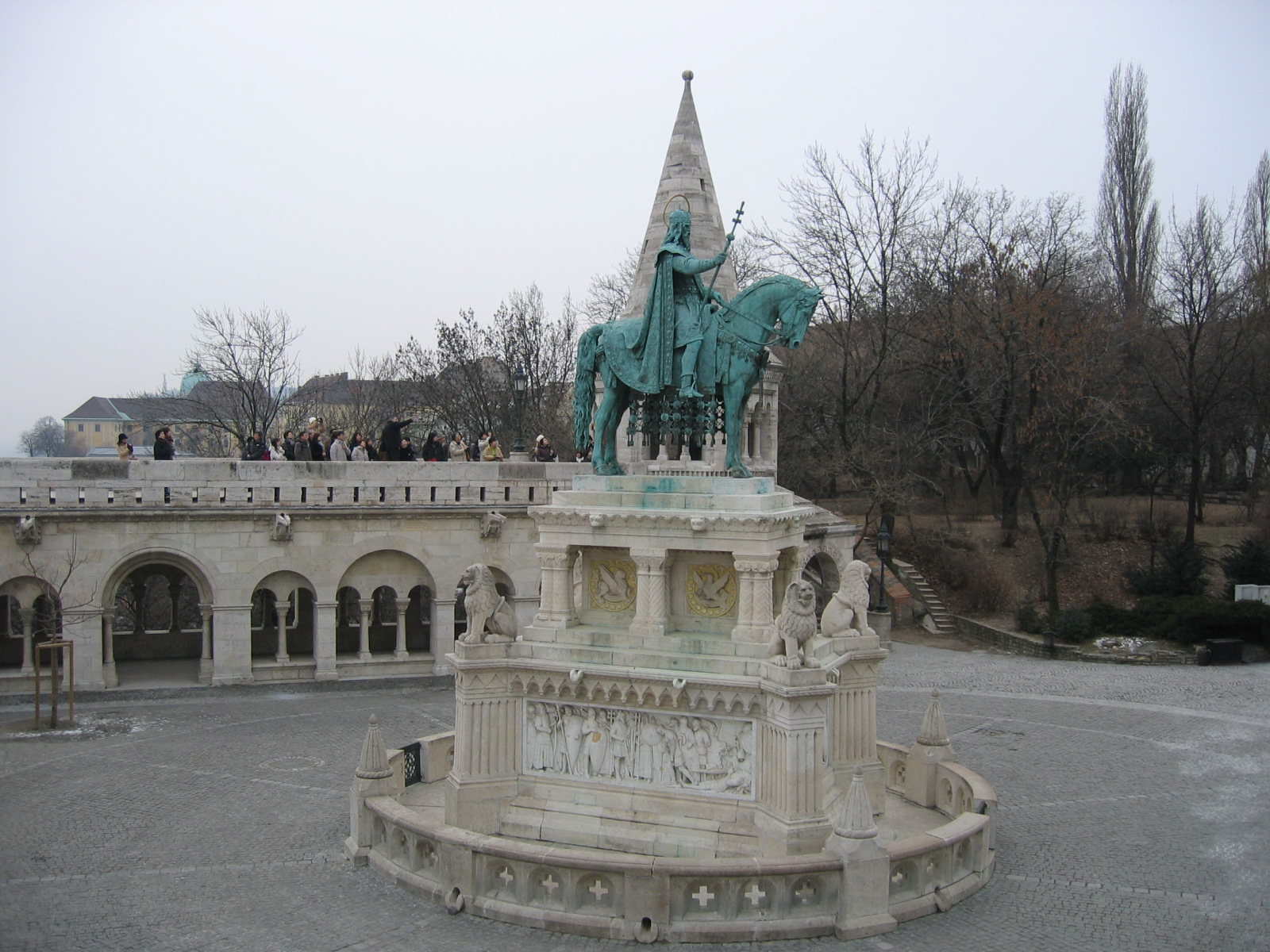
King Stephen I in Budapest

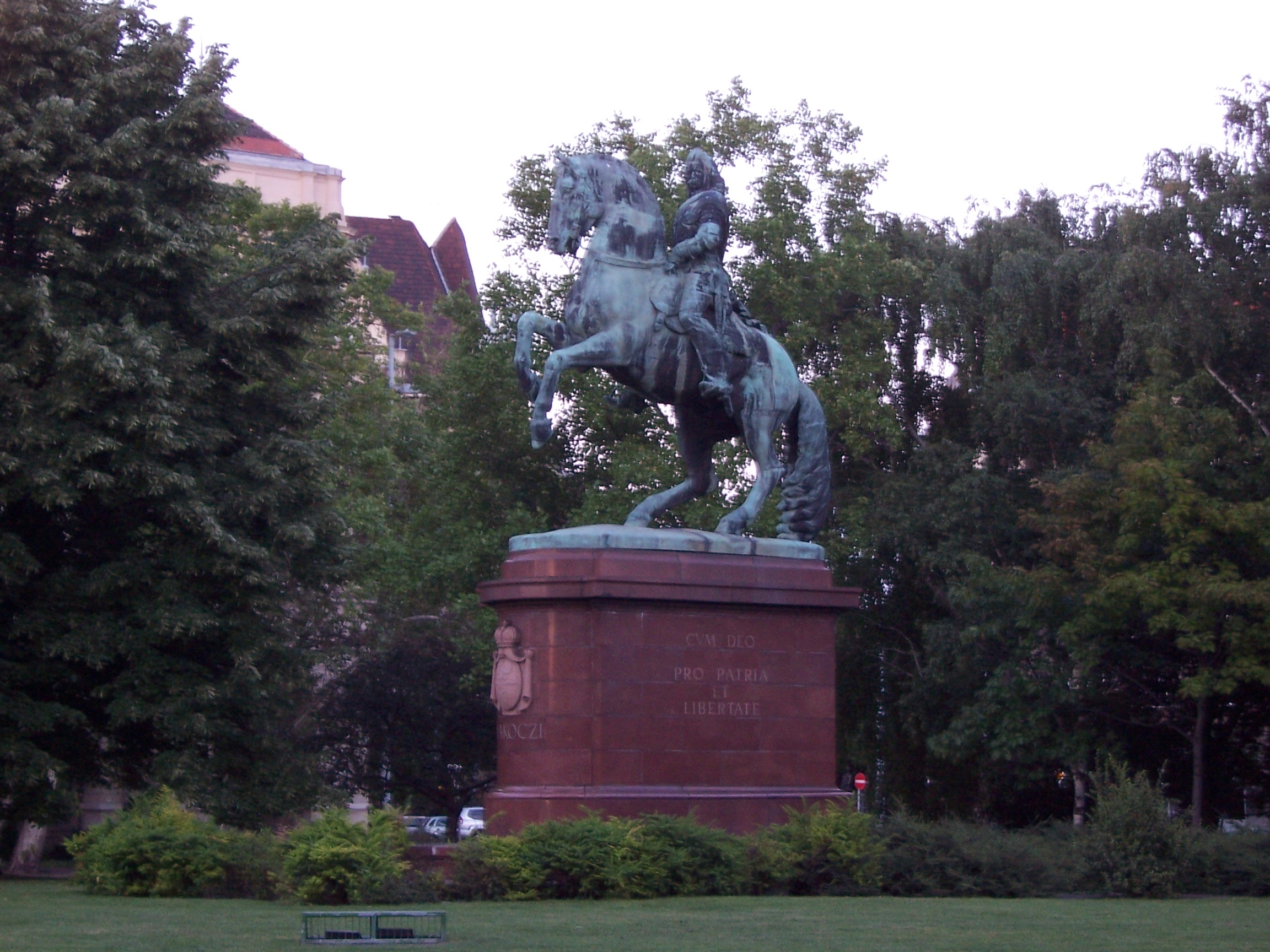
Prince Rákóczi Ferenc II in Budapest

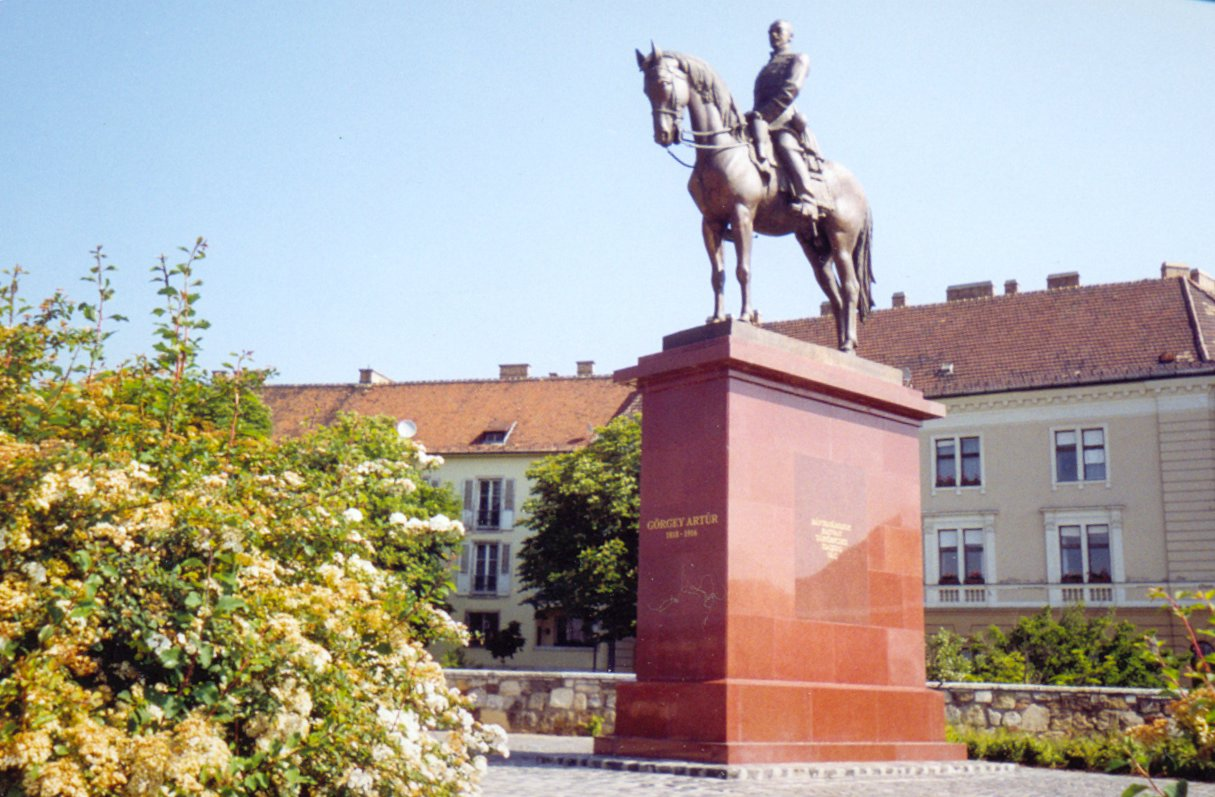
Artúr Görgey in Budapest

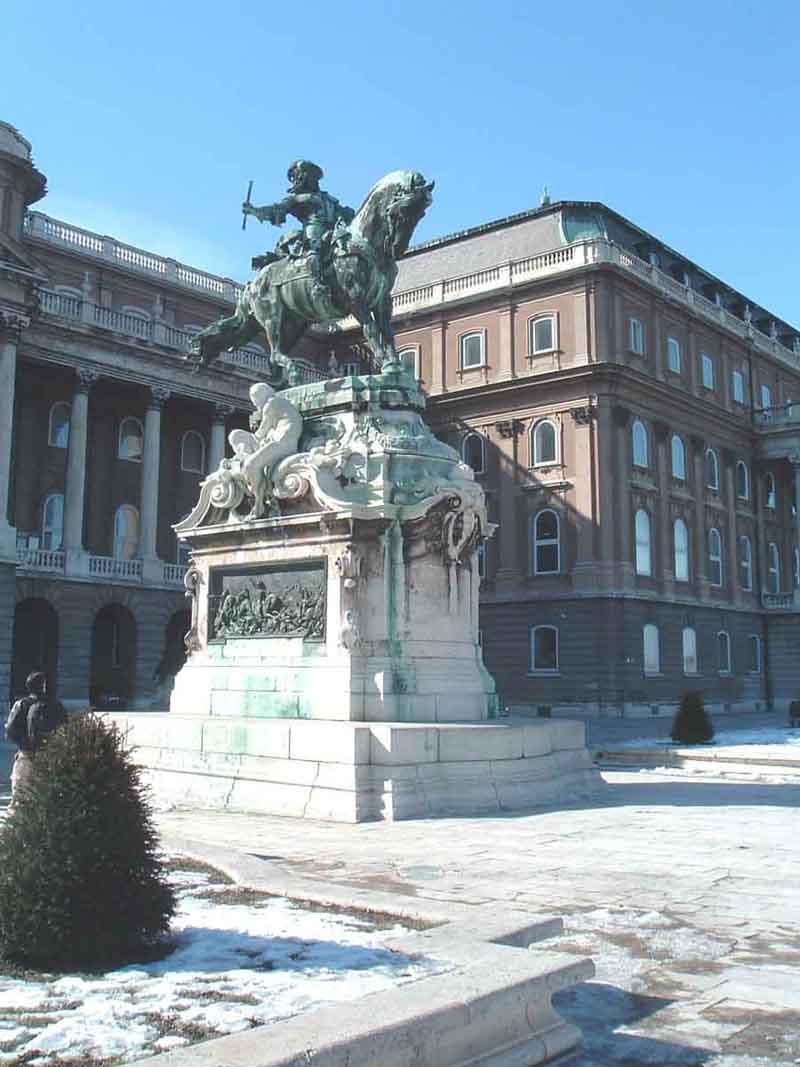
Prince Savoyai Jenő in Budapest

== Dombóvár ==
- Monument to Sebestyén Tinódi Lantos by Dávid Raffay, 2000.
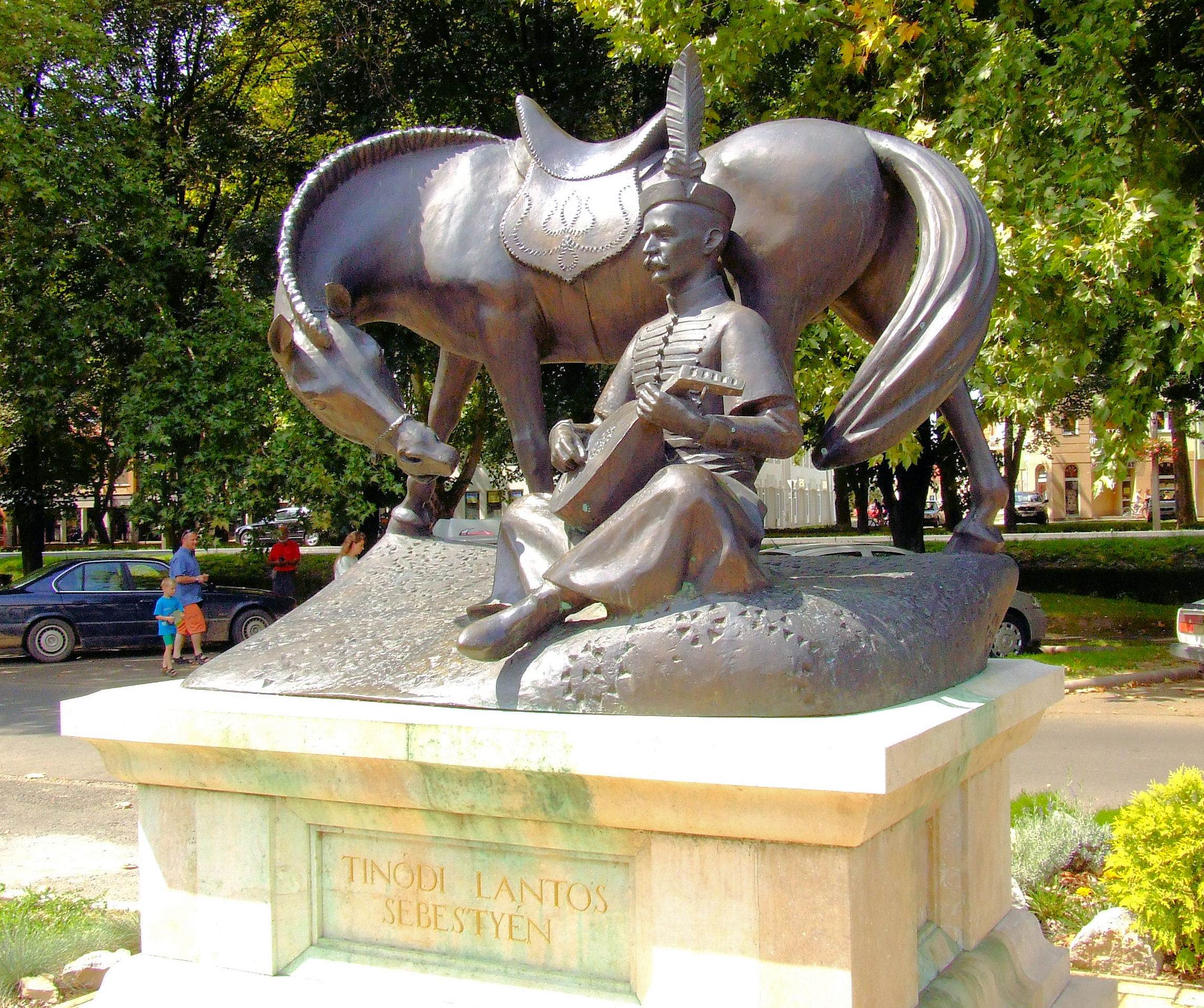
Sebestyén Tinódi Lantos in Dombóvár

== Makó ==
- Equestrian of King Stephen I by Lajos Győrfi and Jenő Ferenc Kiss.
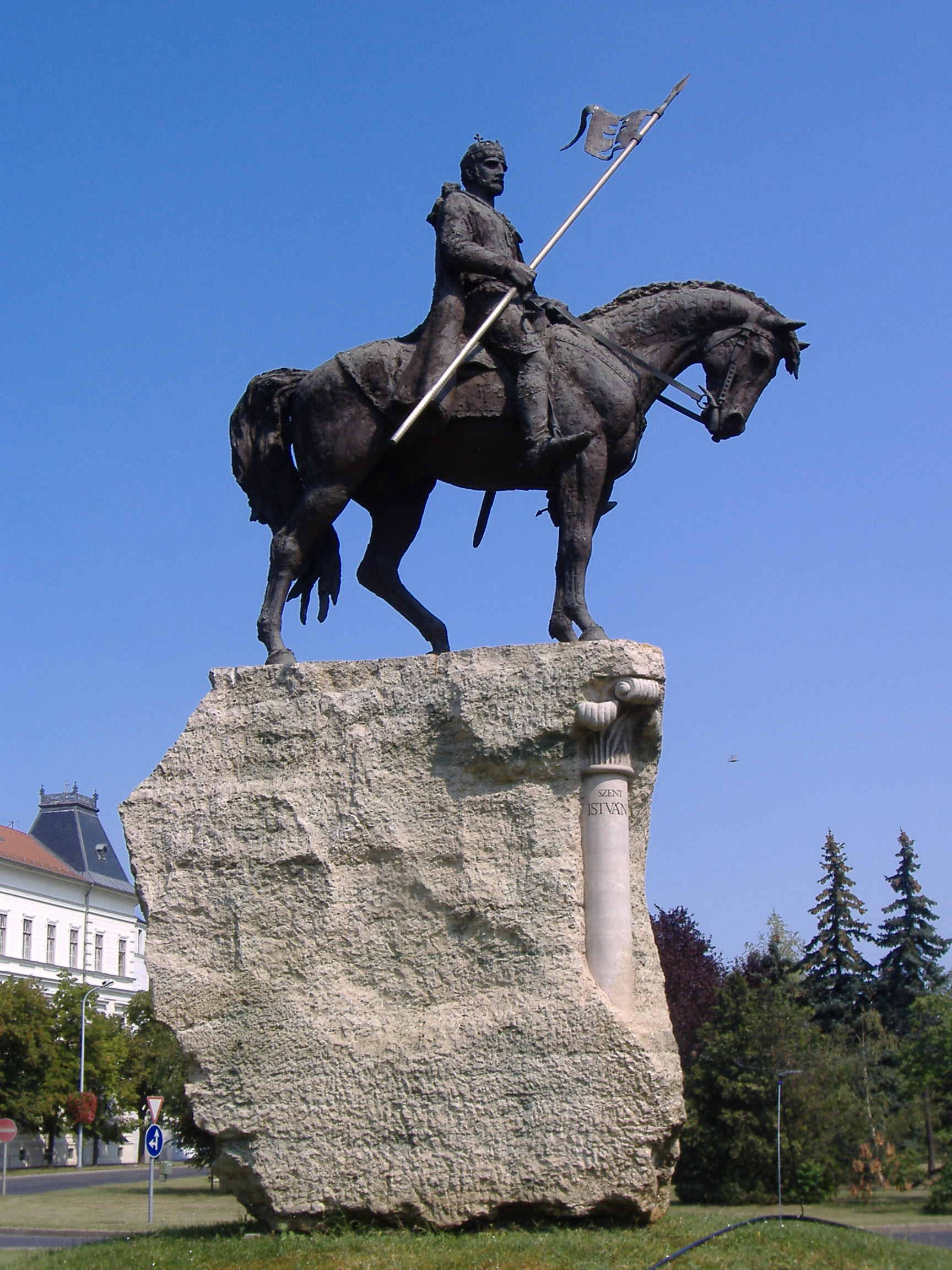
King Stephen I in Makó

== Pécs ==
- Equestrian of Hunyadi János by Pál Pátzay the Széchenyi square, 1956.
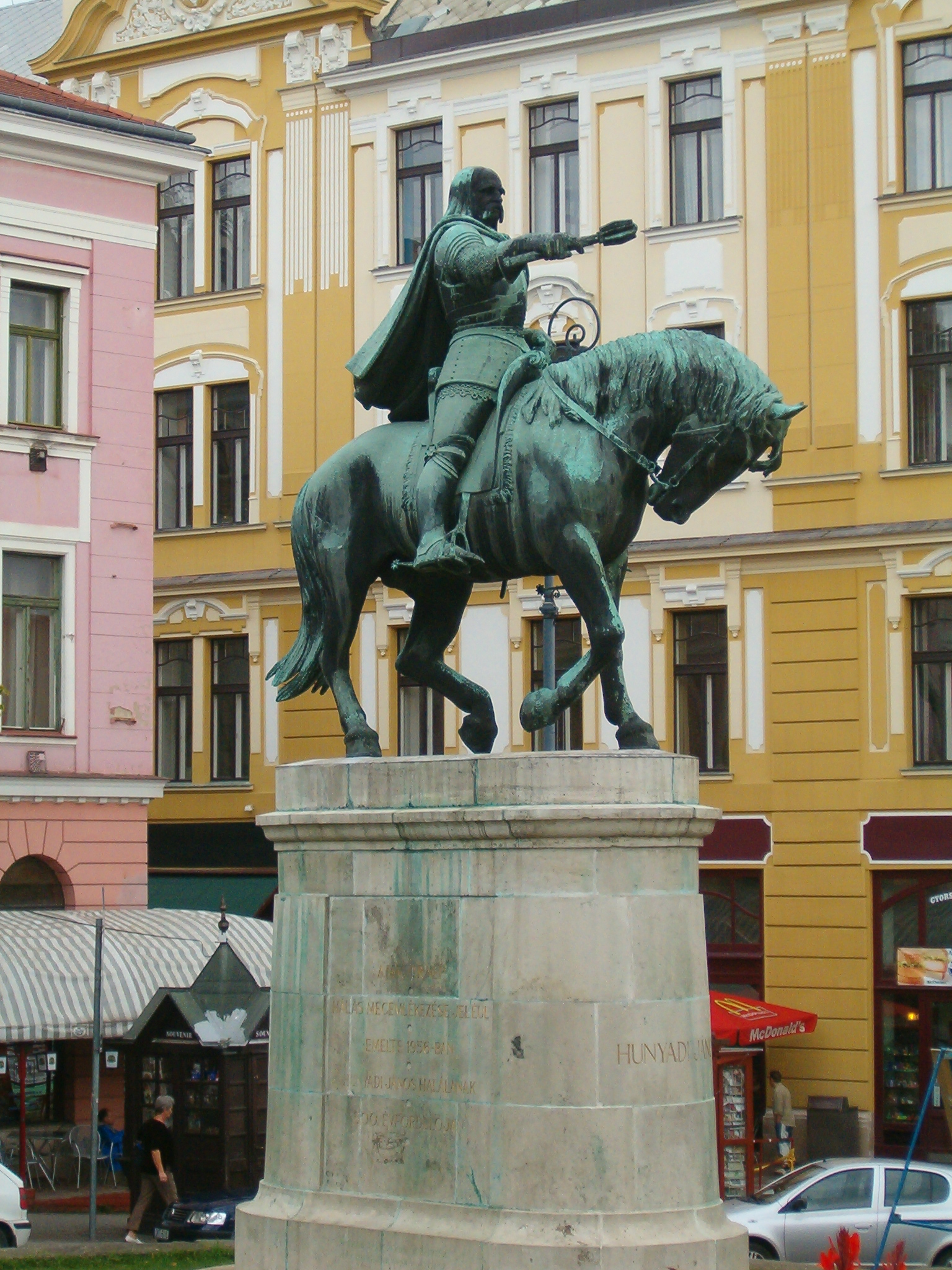
Hunyadi János in Pécs

== Szeged ==
- Equestrian of Prince Rákóczi Ferenc II.
- Equestrian of King Hunyadi Mátyás.
- Memorial of the World War I heroes in front of the Reök-palota (Reok Palace).
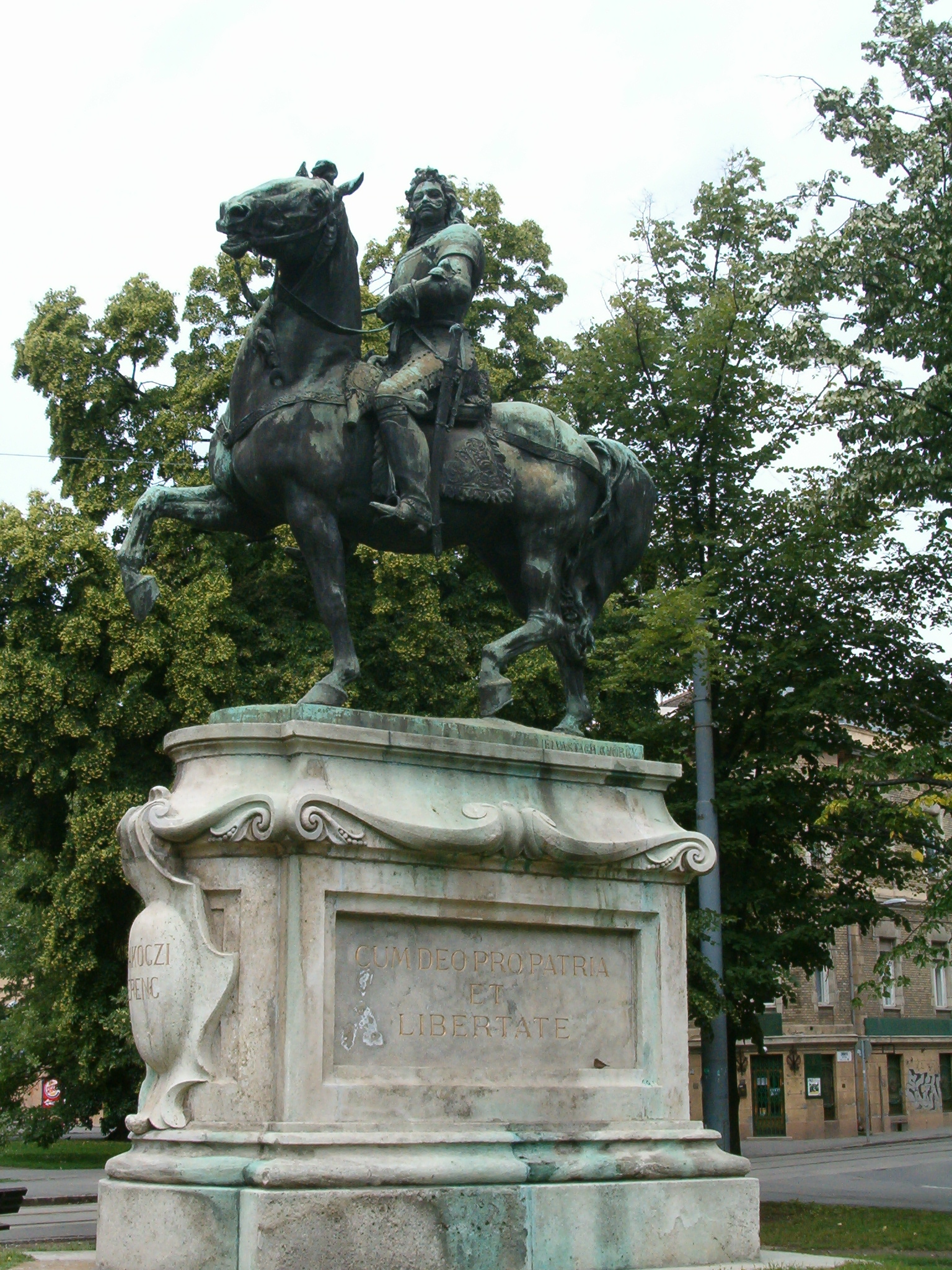
Prince Rákóczi Ferenc II in Szeged

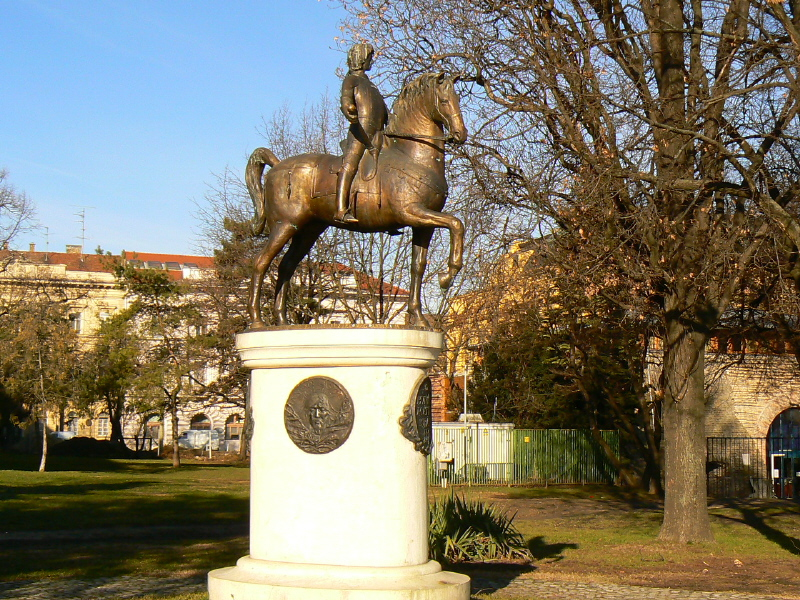
King Hunyadi Mátyás in Szeged

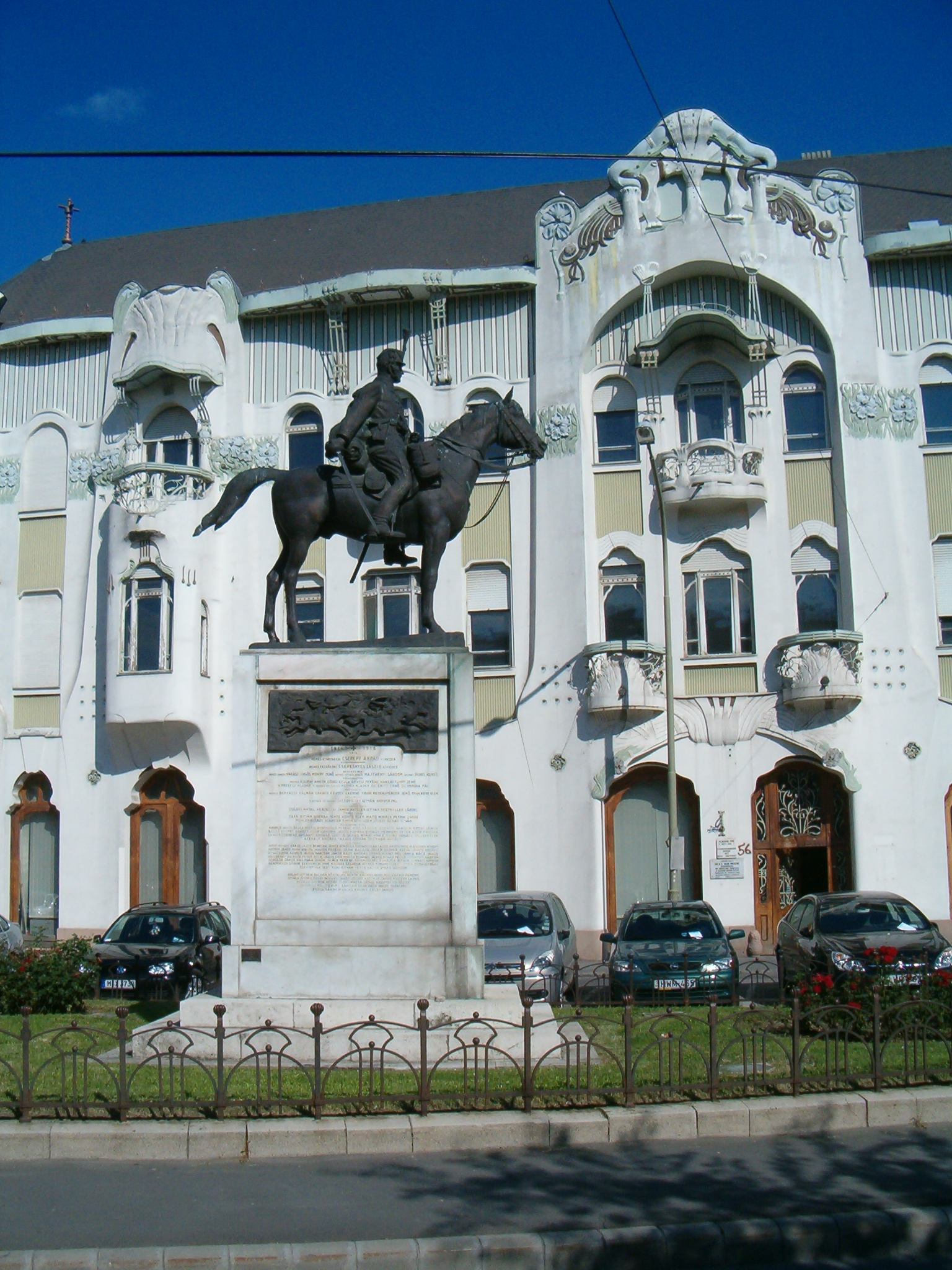
Memorial of the World War I heroes in Szeged

== Székesfehérvár ==
- Equestrian of King Stephen I by Ferenc Sidló, 1938.
- Memorial of 10th Hussar Regiment by Pál Pátzay, 1939.
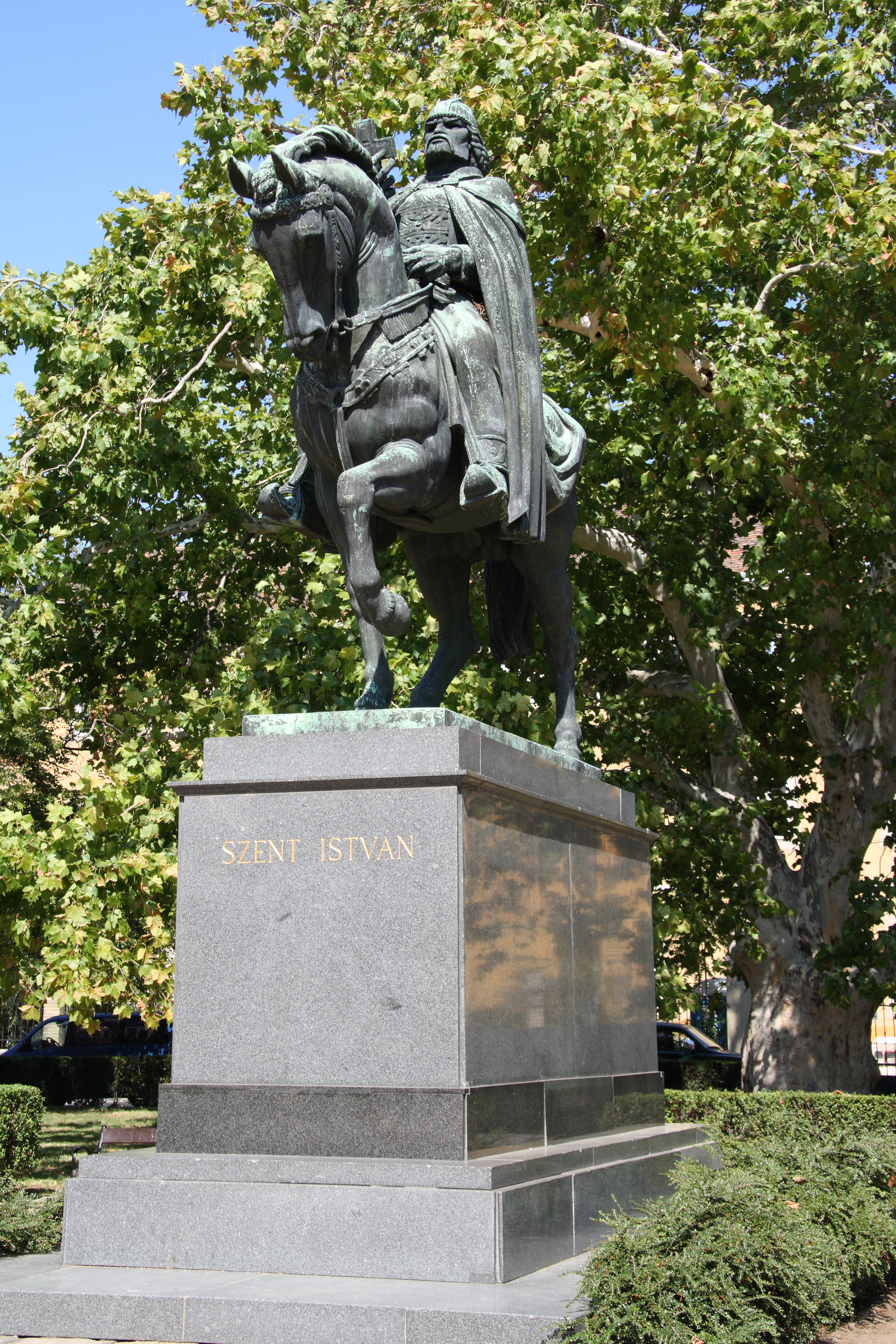
King Stephen I in Székesfehérvár

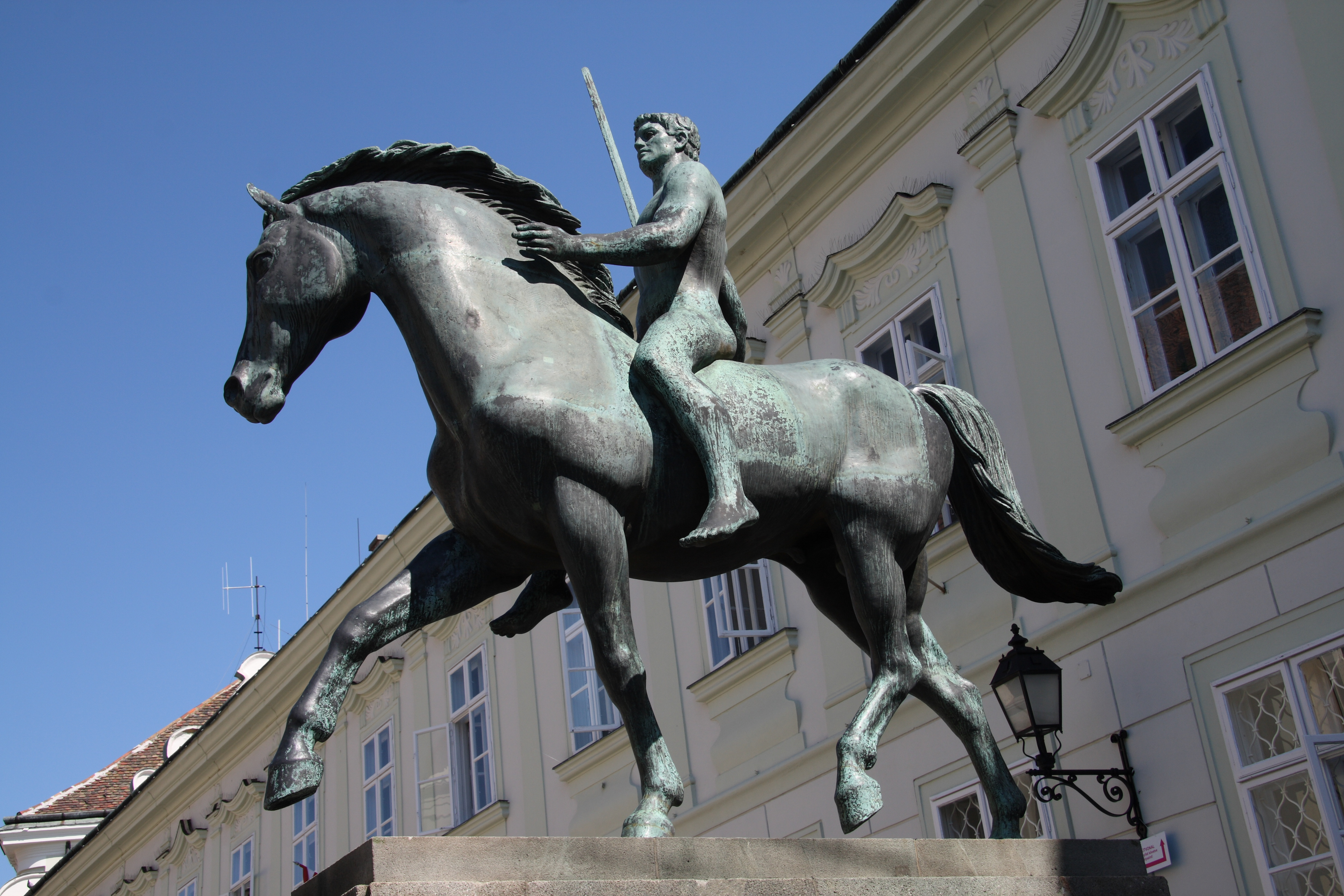
Memorial of 10th Hussar Regiment in Székesfehérvár

== Gyula ==
- Equestrian named Végvári vitéz szobra by Béla Tóth close to the castle of Gyula, 1974.

== Szekszárd ==
- Equestrian of Háry János by Farkas Pál, 1992.
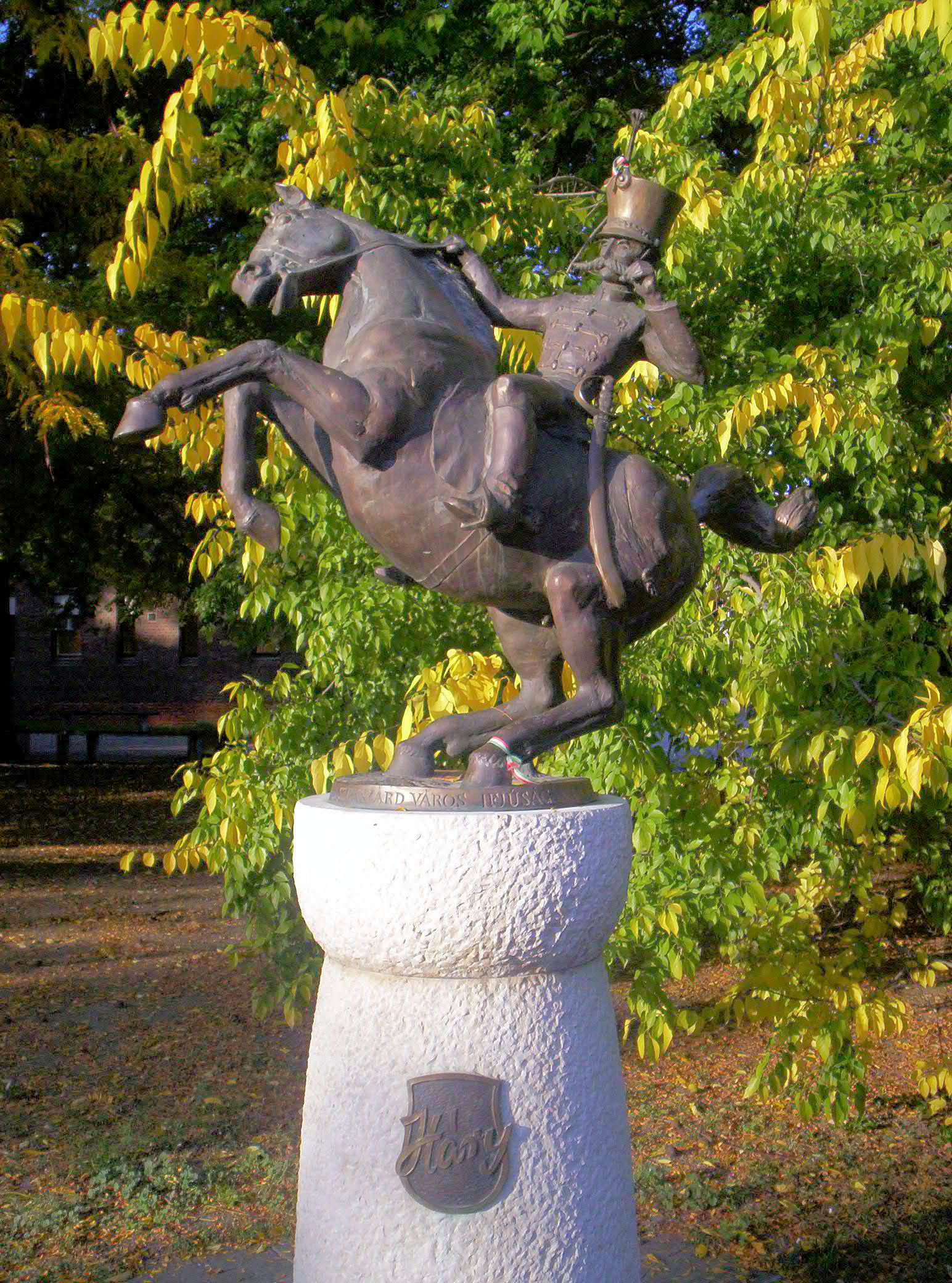
Háry János in Szekszárd

== Szigetvár ==
- Equestrian of Miklós Zrínyi by József Somogyi.
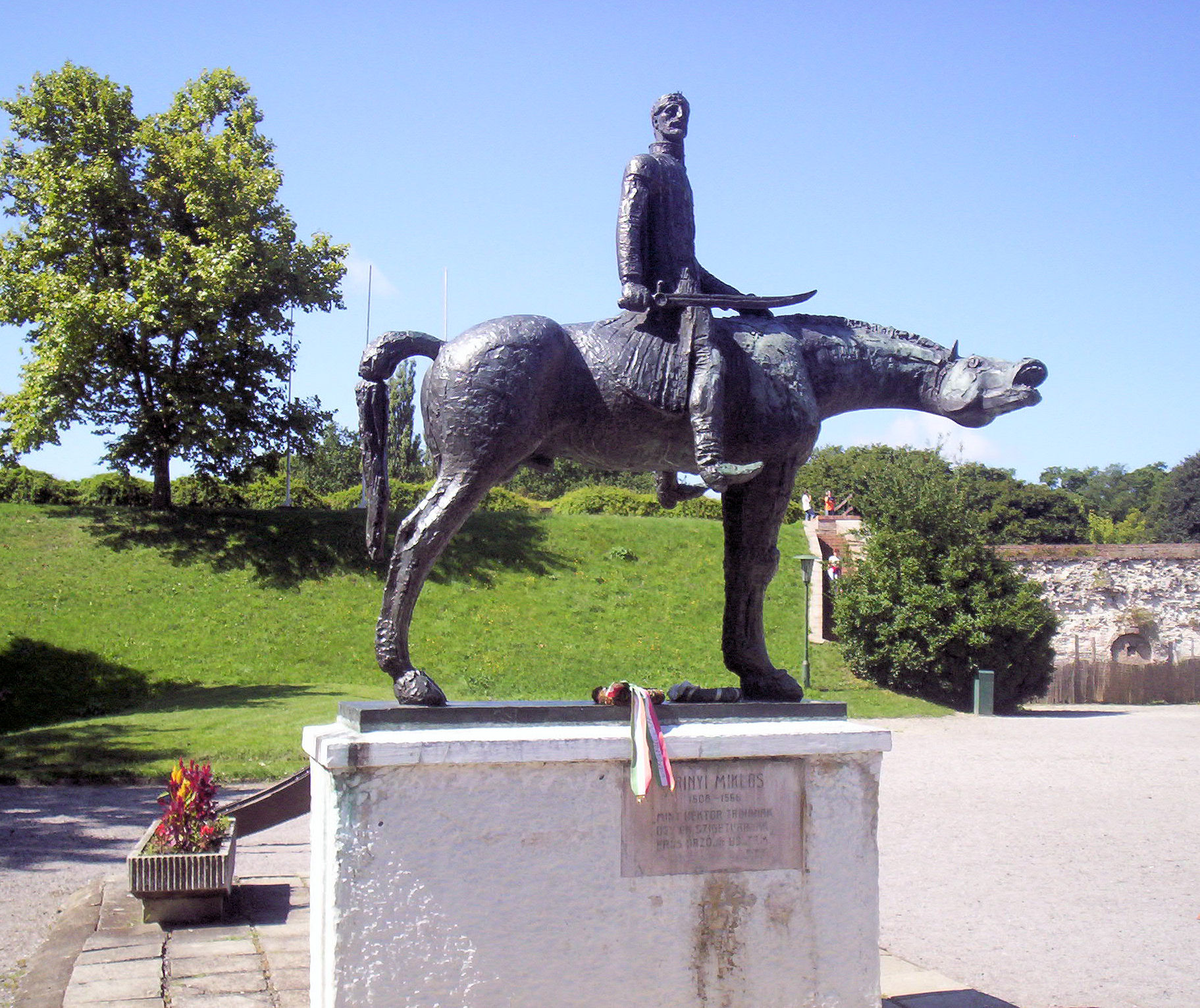
Miklós Zrínyi in Szigetvár

== Tata ==
- Equestrian named Tatai Diana by Béla Tóth close to the Esterházy palace, 1988.
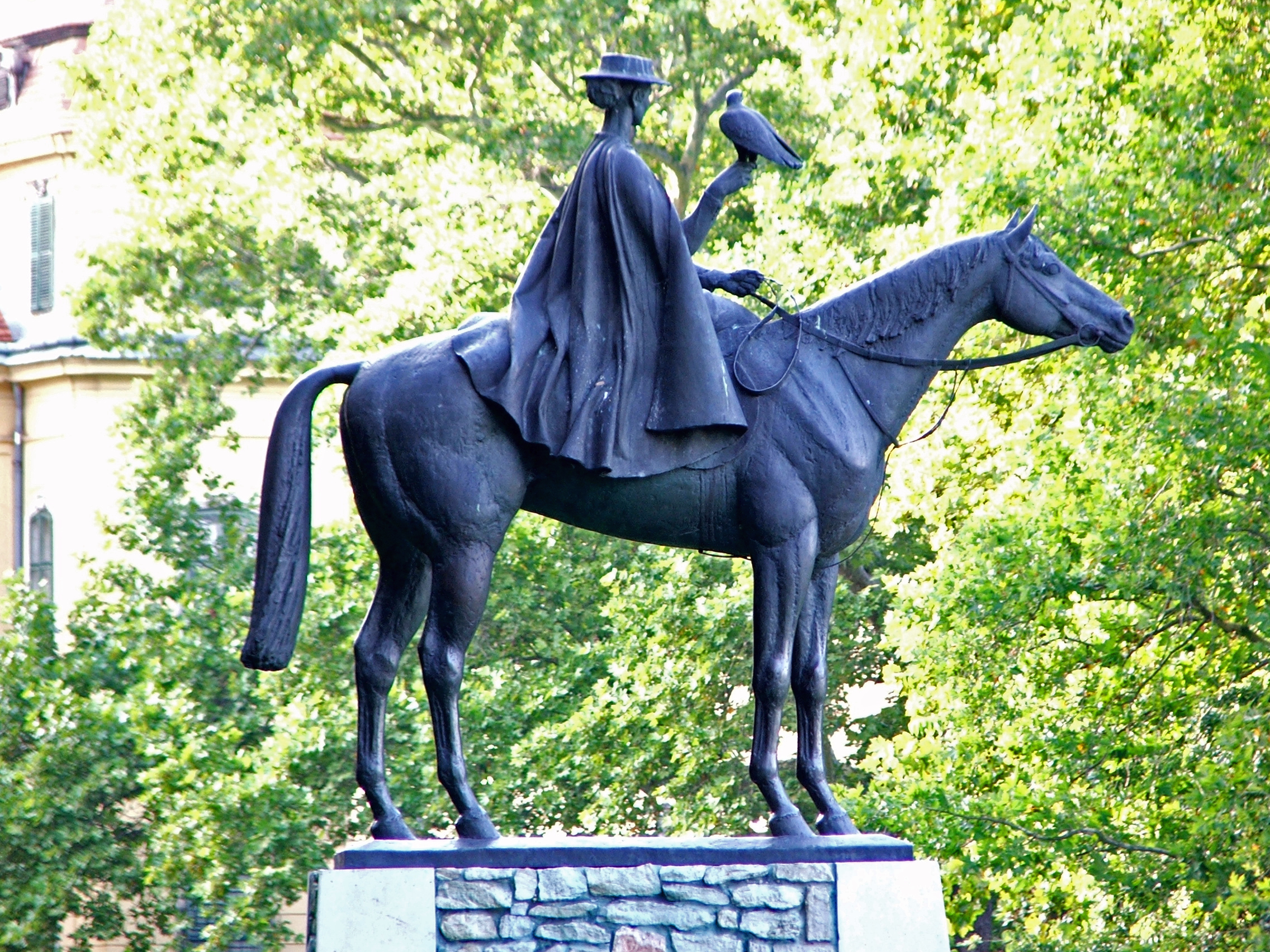
Tatai Diana in Tata

== Tatabánya ==
- Equestrian of Prince József.
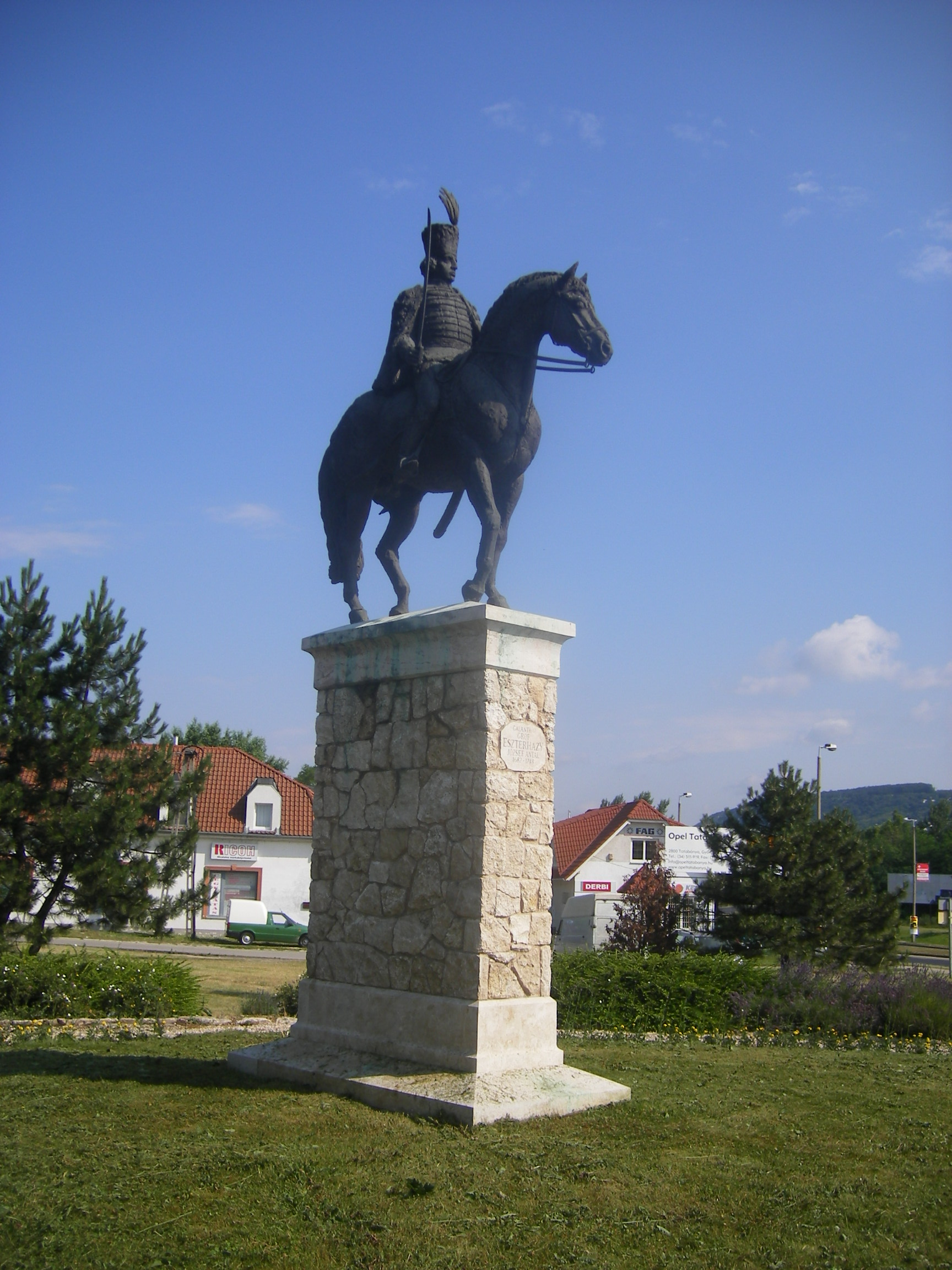
Prince József in Tatabánya

== Zalaegerszeg ==
- Equestrian of Miklós Zrínyi by Tóth Béla, 1989.
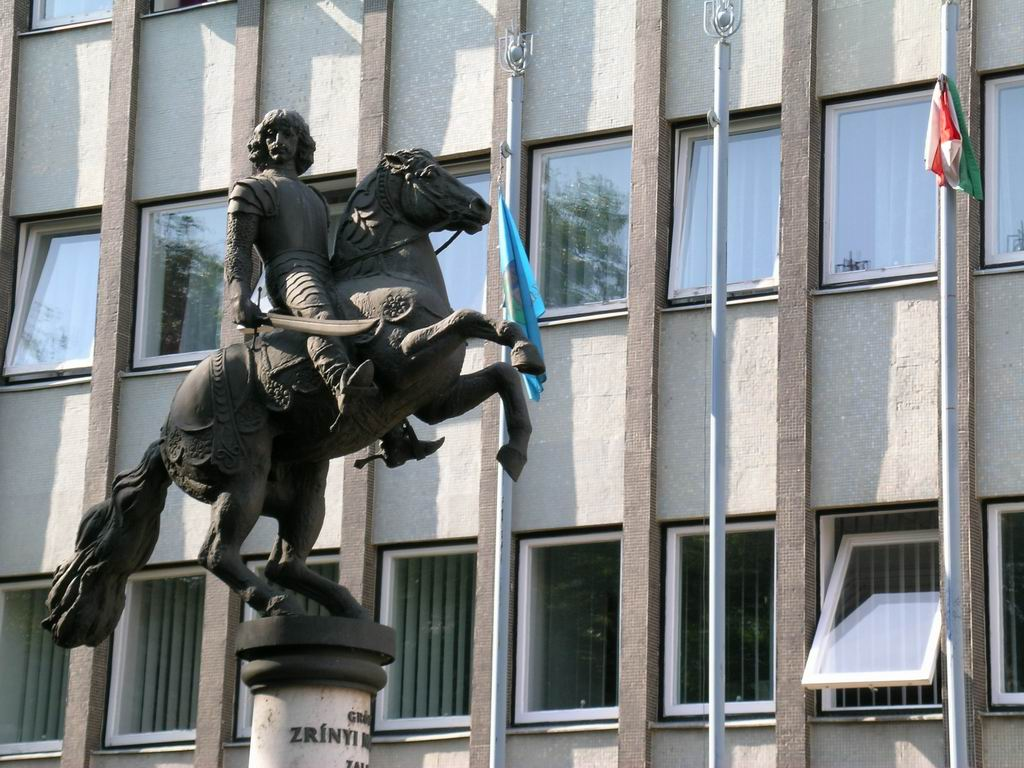
Miklós Zrínyi in Zalaegerszeg
