= István Tóth =

István Tóth may refer to:

- István Tóth (boxer) (1938–1999), Hungarian Olympic boxer
- István Tóth (canoeist), Hungarian sprint canoer
- István Tóth (chemist), Australian peptide researcher
- István Tóth (footballer) (1891–1945), Hungarian amateur footballer and football manager
- István Tóth (wrestler) (born 1951), Hungarian wrestler
- István Tóth (shortest man claimant)
