= Tamás Tóth (disambiguation) =

Tamás Tóth (born 1989) is a Hungarian professional triathlete.

Tamás Tóth may also refer to:

- Tamás Tóth (sport shooter) (born 1965)
- Tamás Tóth (swimmer) (born 1992)

== See also ==
- Thomas Toth, Canadian long-distance runner
