= Lucio Toth =

Dalmatian Italian politician

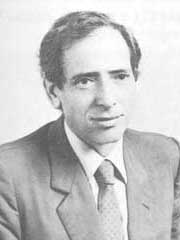

Senator of the Italian Republic
- In office 14 June 1987 – 22 April 1992

Personal details
- Born: 30 December 1934 Zara, Dalmatia now Zadar, Croatia
- Died: 27 April 2017 (aged 82) Rome, Italy

Lucio Toth (30 December 1934 – 27 April 2017) was a Dalmatian Italian politician.

== Life ==
He was born in Zara (today Zadar, Croatia) in Dalmatia. In 1987 he was elected senator of the Italian Republic for the 10th legislature in Naples, for the Christian Democrats. From 1992 to 2013 he was president of the "National Association of Venezia Giulia and Dalmatia" (Associazione Nazionale Venezia Giulia e Dalmazia). He was also the author of essays and articles of legal, historical and political nature. He published three novels about Dalmatia: "The house in Calle San Zorzi" (La casa di Calle San Zorzi) on the events taking place in Zara in the twentieth century, "Spiridione Lascarich Standard bearer of the Serenissima" (Spiridione Lascarich Alfiere della Serenissima) on the Turkish-Venetian wars of the seventeenth century in Dalmatia and Greece, and "The Dalmatian deserter" on the Risorgimento, which was published posthumously. He also wrote the "History of Zadar" (Storia di Zara), dedicated to his native hometown.

He died in Rome on 27 April 2017.

== Nationality ==
Although he was Italian citizen, his surname od Hungarian origin (Tóth).
