= László Tóth =

László Tóth may refer to:

- Laszlo Toth (born 1938), attacker of Michelangelo's Pietà statue
- László Tóth, protagonist of the 2024 film The Brutalist
- László Tóth (water polo) (born 1968)
- László Tóth (footballer) (born 1995)
- László Tóth (racing driver) (born 2000)
- László Fejes Tóth (1915–2005), Hungarian mathematician
- László Tahi Tóth (1944–2018), Hungarian actor
- Lazlo Toth, pen name of comedian and author Don Novello (born 1943)
