= Gyula Tóth =

Gyula Tóth may also refer to:

- Gyula Tóth (footballer, born 1901) (1901–1936), Hungarian footballer
- Gyula Tóth (footballer, born 1920), Hungarian footballer who played in Italy for Lucchese in 1947–1950
- Gyula Tóth (footballer, born 1941) (1941–2014), Yugoslav football coach and goalkeeper
- Gyula Tóth (footballer, born 1945) (1945–2025), Hungarian footballer
- Gyula Tóth (futsal player) (born 1982), Hungarian futsal player
- Gyula Tóth (runner) (1936–2006), Hungarian marathon runner
- Gyula Tóth (water polo), Hungarian water polo coach, see Hungary women's national water polo team
- Gyula Tóth (wrestler) (1927–2001), Hungarian wrestler who won bronze medal in the 1956 Olympics
