= Géza Tóth =

Géza Tóth may refer to:

- Géza Tóth (gymnast) (1907–1990), Hungarian Olympic gymnast
- Géza Tóth (handballer) (1962–2004), Hungarian handball player
- Géza Tóth (weightlifter) (1932–2011), Hungarian weightlifter
- Géza M. Tóth (born 1970), Hungarian filmmaker

== See also ==
- Tóth (surname)
