= Mihály Tóth =

Mihály Tóth may refer to

- Mihály Tóth (footballer, born 1926), Hungarian football player during the 1940s and 1950s
- Mihály Tóth (footballer, born 1974), Hungarian football player currently with Hungarian team Szolnoki MÁV FC
