= Ildikó Tóth =

Ildikó Tóth may refer to:

- Ildikó Tóth (water polo), Hungarian water polo player
- Ildikó Tóth (actress), Hungarian actress
