= Ferenc Tóth =

Ferenc Tóth may refer to:

- Ferenc Tóth (wrestler) (1909–1981), Hungarian wrestler
- Ferenc Tóth (politician) (1950–2020), Hungarian engineer and politician
- Ferenc Tóth (pilot), Hungarian glider aerobatic pilot
