= Mikuláš Tóth =

Mikuláš Tóth may refer to:

- Mikuláš Tóth (bishop) (1833–1882), Slovak Greek Catholic bishop
- Mikuláš Tóth (footballer) (born 1988), Slovak footballer
