= Krisztina Tóth =

Krisztina Tóth may refer to:

- Krisztina Tóth (table tennis) (born 1974), Hungarian table tennis player
- Krisztina Tóth (writer) (born 1967), Hungarian writer and poet
