= Alexandra Tóth =

Alexandra Tóth may refer to:

- Alexandra Tóth (footballer, born 1990) (born 1990), Hungarian footballer (MTK) in the Hungary women's national football team
- Alexandra Tóth (footballer, born 1991) (born 1991), Hungarian footballer (Viktória FC)
- Alexandra Toth (sprinter), see Austria at the 2018 European Athletics Championships
