= Les Toth =

Australian DJ

- Born: 7 September 1952 (age 73); Melbourne, Victoria, Australia
- Occupations: Actor, comedian, radio presenter, artist
- Years active: 1979–present

Les Toth (born 7 September 1952) is a Melbourne-based actor and DJ who has had several film and television roles. He has also been one of the city's best known DJs for several decades.

Some of Les' television and film credits include Garbo, The Castle, Janus, Stingers, and Neighbours. Les was a radio announcer on City FM between 1999 and 2001.

In 2024 Les released his inaugural art exhibition Retro Riff, an assemblage of 24 repurposed guitars.
