= Kálmán Tóth =

Kálmán Tóth may refer to:

- Kálmán Tóth (poet) (1831–1881), Hungarian poet
- Kálmán Tóth (footballer) (born 1944), Hungarian footballer
