= Cynthia Ann Toth =

American ophthalmologist and professor

- Education: Drexel University; Geisinger Medical Center; University of California, Davis
- Occupation: ophthalmologist
- Scientific career
- Workplaces: Duke University

Cynthia Ann Toth is an American ophthalmologist who is Distinguished Professor of Ophthalmology at Duke University. Toth has pioneered the use of optical coherence tomography to better understand, diagnose and treat macular disease. She was awarded the 2021 Retina Research Foundation Pyron Award.

== Early life and education ==
Toth earned her medical degree at Drexel University. She was the first person in her family to become a doctor. She moved to the Geisinger Medical Center and University of California, Davis for postgraduate study. After her residency, she joined the United States Air Force and served as an ophthalmologist in the field. After working in the Air Force, Toth decided she wanted to specialize in the retina, and moved to Wilford Hall Medical Centre as Chief of the Retina Service. She developed optical coherence tomography (OCT) for investigating retinal laser injury.

== Research and career ==
Toth joined the faculty of Duke in 1993. She works on the diagnosis and surgical treatment of vitreoretinal and macular diseases. She uses optical coherence tomography to better understand disease and perform more precise surgery. She developed OCT for infant examination and guided ophthalmic surgery. OCT provides novel insight into eye conditions and information about changes in brain function. The Duke Advanced Research in Spectral Domain/Swept Source OCT Imaging (DARSI) Laboratory, established by Toth, looks to improve diagnostic methods for age-related macular degeneration (AMD) and retinal disease.

Toth demonstrated that macular translocation surgery could provide salvage therapy to people who had lost vision due to neovascular AMD, which resulted in the opportunity to auto-transplant the retina. DARSI uses OCT to investigate non-vascular aspects of retinopathy of prematurity (ROP) in awake infants. She was the first to demonstrate the in vivo process of retina maturation, developing a 3D rating system for retinal vascular abnormalities and macular edema. Her efforts have proven that OCT performed at the bedside in neonatal intensive care units can help to identify infants with vision and neurodevelopment problems and micro-anatomic response to interventions.

Toth developed portable OCT to image during surgery, and the first OCT-driven stereoscopic heads-up display (HUD) that can visualize surgical information in a microscope. In 2021, she was awarded the Retina Research Foundation Pyron Award and listed in the Global Ophthalmology Power List.

== Selected publications ==
- Stephanie J Chiu; Xiao T Li; Peter Nicholas; Cynthia A Toth; Izatt, Joseph; Sina Farsiu (2010). "Automatic segmentation of seven retinal layers in SDOCT images congruent with expert manual segmentation". Optics Express. 18 (18): 19413–19428. doi:10.1364/oe.18.019413. PMC 3408910. PMID 20940837. Wikidata Q41966956.
- Maureen G Maguire; Daniel F Martin; Gui-Shuang Ying; et al. (2016). "Five-Year Outcomes with Anti-Vascular Endothelial Growth Factor Treatment of Neovascular Age-Related Macular Degeneration: The Comparison of Age-Related Macular Degeneration Treatments Trials". Ophthalmology. 123 (8): 1751–61. doi:10.1016/j.ophtha.2016.03.045. PMC 4958614. PMID 27156698. Wikidata Q28049700.
- Juan E Grunwald; Ebenezer Daniel; Jiayan Huang; et al. (2013). "Risk of geographic atrophy in the comparison of age-related macular degeneration treatments trials". Ophthalmology. 121 (1): 150–161. doi:10.1016/j.ophtha.2013.08.015. PMC 3892560. PMID 24084496. Wikidata Q35003936.
