= Norbert Tóth =

Norbert Tóth may refer to:

- Norbert Tóth (footballer) (born 1976), Hungarian football player
- Norbert Tóth (racing driver) (born 1998), Hungarian racing driver
- Norbert Tóth (basketball) (born 1986), Hungarian basketball player
- Norbert Tóth (racewalker) (born 2001), Hungarian racewalker
