= János Tóth =

János Tóth can refer to:

- János Tóth (athlete) (born 1978), Hungarian athlete
- János Tóth (politician) (1864-1929), Hungarian politician
- János Tóth (swimmer) (born 1955), Hungarian swimmer
