= Gyula Tóth (footballer, born 1945) =

Hungarian footballer (1945–2025)

Personal information
- Date of birth: 4 March 1945
- Place of birth: Salomvár, Hungary
- Date of death: 28 June 2025 (aged 80)
- Place of death: Zalaegerszeg, Hungary
- Position: Forward

Youth career
- Salomvár

Senior career*
Years	Team	Apps	(Gls)
–1966	Szombathelyi Haladás		
1966–1972	Budapest Honvéd	118	(5)
1972–1979	Zalaegerszeg	168	(10)
- * Club domestic league appearances and goals

Gyula Tóth (4 March 1945 – 28 June 2025) was a Hungarian footballer who played as a forward.

Tóth started his career as a youngster in his native village Salomvár, near to Zalalövő, then moved to the Szombathelyi Haladás NBI/B team. In 1966, he transferred to Budapest Honvéd and was already in the starting lineup in the first round. During his years in Kispest, he played 118 league matches for Honvéd. He was a member of the silver medal team in 1969 and 1972, and the bronze medal team in 1970. He played in the cup final twice with Honvéd. In 1972, he transferred to Zalaegerszeg, where he played football until his retirement in 1979. Tóth played a total of 286 times in the top division and scored 15 goals. He died on 28 June 2025, at the age of 80.

== Honours ==
Budapest Honvéd

- Nemzeti Bajnokság I runner up: 1969, 1971–72
- Magyar Kupa finalist: 1968, 1969
