= Máté Tóth =

Máté Tóth may refer to:

- Máté Tóth (footballer, born 1991), Hungarian footballer for Vasas
- Máté Tóth (footballer, born 1998), Hungarian footballer for Békéscsaba
