= István Tóth (chemist) =

Australian scientist and chemical engineer

István Tóth is an Australian scientist and chemical engineer. He is the Chair of Biological Chemistry and Professor of Pharmacy at the University of Queensland.

== Education ==
Has a Master's in Chemical Engineering and a Ph.D. from the Technical University Budapest and is a member of the Hungarian Academy of Sciences. Toth is also a fellow of the Queensland Academy of Art and Sciences and Royal Australian Chemical Institute, and Affiliated Professorial Research Fellow and Group Leader at Institute of Molecular Biosciences, UQ.

== Career ==
After earning his Ph.D., he spent two years at Carleton University, Ottawa. In 1977, Toth returned to Budapest and began working at the Central Research Institute for Chemistry of the Hungarian Academy of Sciences before relocating to the School of Pharmacy University of London in 1987.

In 1994, Toth was awarded a DSc degree by the Hungarian Academy of Sciences for his work on drug delivery. He then joined the University of Queensland in 1998 to lead a productive medicinal chemistry research group and became an Australian citizen in the year 2000.

Toth is an elected Fellow of the Royal Australian Chemical Institute, Fellow of the Queensland Academy of Arts and Sciences and Member (External) of the Hungarian Academy of Sciences.

In 2009, he received the Adrian Albert award for sustained research in medicinal biochemistry. In 2019, he received the Doctor Honoris Causa Degree by the Semmelweis University.

== Selected publications ==
- Zhao, L.; Jin, W.; Cruz, J. G.; Marasini, N.; Khalil, Z, G.; Capon, R. J.; Hussein, W. M.; Skwarczynski, M.; Toth, I. Development of polyelectrolyte complexes for the delivery of peptide-based subunit vaccines against group A streptococcus. Nanomaterials, 2020, 10, 823; doi:10.3390/nano10050823
- Faruck, M. O.; Zhao, L.; Hussein, W. M.; Khalil, Z. G.; Capon, R. J.; Skwarczynski, M.; Toth I. Polyacrylate-peptide antigen conjugate as a single-dose oral vaccine against Group A Streptococcus, Vaccines, 2020,8, 23; doi:10.3390/vaccines8010023.
- Azuar, A.; Jin, W.; Mukaida, S.; Hussein, W. M.; Toth I.; Skwarczynski, M. Recent Advances in the Development of Peptide Vaccines and their Delivery Systems against Group A Streptococcus Vaccines,2019, 7, 58; doi:10.3390/vaccines7030058.
- Khongkowa, M.; Liu, T-Y.; Bartlett, S.; Hussein, W. M.; Nevagi, R.; Jia, Z.; Monteiro, M. J.; Wells, J. W.; Ruktanonchai, U. R.; Skwarczynski, M.; Toth, I. Liposomal formulation of polyacrylate-peptide conjugate as a new vaccine candidate against cervical cancer. Prec. Nanomed. 2018, 1, 186–196. DOI:10.29016/181025.1
- Skwarczynski, M.; Toth, I. Peptide-based synthetic vaccines Chemical Science,2016, 7, 842 – 854.DOI: 10.1039/c5sc03892h
- Goodwin, D.; Varamini, P.; Simerska, P.; D'Occhio, M. J.; Toth, I. Design, synthesis and evaluation of a gonadotropin releasing hormone-based subunit vaccine in rams (Ovis aries). Vaccine 2015, 33, 1453–1458.
- Stephenson, R.; Varamini, P.; Butcher, N.; Minchin, R.; Toth, I. Effect of lipidated gonadotropin-releasing hormone peptides on receptor mediated binding and uptake into prostate cancer cells in vitro. Nanomed.-Nanotechnol. Biol. Med. 2014, 10, 1799–1808.
- Deng, Z. J.; Liang, M.; Monteiro, M.; Toth, I.; Minchin, R. F. Nanoparticle-induced unfolding of fibrinogen promotes Mac-1 receptor activation and inflammation. Nat. Nanotechnol. 2011, 6, 39–44.
- Skwarczynski, M.; Zhao, G.; Boer, J. C.; Ozberk, V.; Azuar, A.; Cruz, J. G.; Giddam, A. K.; Khalil, Z. G.; Pandey, M.; Shibu, M. A.; Hussein, W. M.; Nevagi, R.; Batzloff, M. R.; Wells, J. W.; Capon, R. J.; Plebanski, M.; Good, M. F.; Toth, I. Poly(amino acids) as a potent self-adjuvanting delivery system for peptide-based nanovaccines. Sci Adv 2020, 6, eaax2285.
