= Imre Tóth =

Imre Tóth may refer to:

- Imre Tóth (boxer) (1948–2017), Hungarian boxer
- Imre Tóth (motorcycle racer) (born 1985), Hungarian motorcycle racer
- Imre Tóth (philosopher) (1921–2010), Romanian philosopher
- Imre Tóth (water polo) (born 1963), Hungarian water polo player
