= Gabriella Tóth =

Gabriella Tóth may refer to:

- Gabriella Tóth (footballer) (born 1986), Hungarian football midfielder
- Gabriella Tóth (handballer) (born 1996), Hungarian handball player
