= Bence Tóth =

Bence Tóth may refer to:

- Bence Tóth (footballer, born 1989), Hungarian footballer
- Bence Tóth (footballer, born 1998), Hungarian footballer
