= Péter Tóth =

Péter Tóth may refer to:

- Péter Tóth (fencer) (1882–1967), Hungarian sabre and foil fencer
- Peter Wolf Toth (born 1947), Hungarian-born American sculptor
- Peter Toth (chess player) (born 1940), Brazilian chess player
- Péter Tóth (footballer, born 1977), Hungarian footballer
- Péter Tóth (footballer, born 1989), Hungarian footballer
- Péter Tóth (footballer, born 2001), Hungarian footballer
- Péter Tóth (pianist) (born 1983), Hungarian pianist
- Péter Tóth (handballer) (born 2000), Hungarian handballer
