= Béla Tóth =

Hungarian football manager

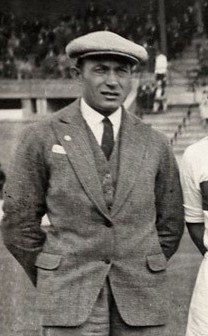

Personal information
- Full name: Béla Tóth
- Place of birth: Hungary

Managerial career
- Years: Team
- 1927-1932: Turkey

Béla Tóth was a Hungarian professional football manager who managed the Turkey national team.

== Managerial career ==
Tóth managed the Turkey national football team from 1927 to 1932. He made his managerial debut in a set of matches against Bulgaria in June 1927, tying 3-3 and winning the rematch with a score of 3–1. He participated in the 1928 Summer Olympics with the Turkish national team. He was dismissed on 17 April 1932 after a streak of 4 consecutive losses. In total, he managed Turkey for 8 matches and had a record of 2 wins 1 draw and 5 losses, with 14 goals scored and 25 conceded.
