= Thomas Toth =

Canadian long-distance runner

Thomas Toth is a Canadian long-distance runner from Lakefield, Ontario who now lives in Plaistow, New Hampshire.

== College career ==
He competed for Cameron University where he earned All-Conference, All Region, All-American honors, along with winning the LSC Conference Championship.

== International career ==
He competed at the 2017 IAAF World Cross Country Championships, finishing in 105th place in Kampala, Uganda.

Toth debuted at a half marathon in Houston, Texas in January 2016. In his debut Toth managed a 64:26 to qualify for the world half marathon championships to take place in Cardiff, Wales, the 9th fastest in Canadian history.

Toth holds a qualifying time for the 2017 World Championships in Athletics.

He went on to place 54th at the world championships in England and placed as the top Canadian.

Toth won his first national title at the half marathon distance in only his second attempt at 21.1 km.
