= László Tahi Tóth =

Hungarian stage, television, and film actor

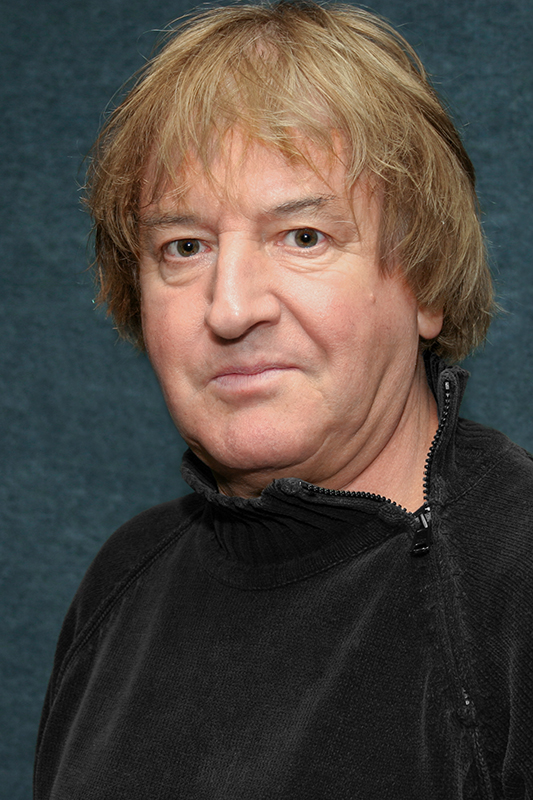
- Born: 23 January 1944; Budapest, Kingdom of Hungary
- Died: 22 February 2018 (aged 74); Budapest, Hungary
- Occupations: stage, television and film actor

László Tahi Tóth (23 January 1944 – 22 February 2018) was a Kossuth Prize-awarded Hungarian stage, television and film actor. He was a member of The Vígszínház.

== Personal life and death ==
Tahi Tóth was one of seven sons born to Eleanor Pfeiffer and Nándor Tahi Tóth. Two of Tahi Tóth's brothers were also actors.

Szilvia Kárászy, a pianist, married Tahi Tóth in 1995.

Tahi Tóth died in Budapest, Hungary on 22 February 2018 of a stroke, at the age of 74.

== Selected filmography ==
- Red Letter Days (1967)
- Three Nights of Love (1967)
- Stars of Eger (1968)
- Imposztorok (1969)
- Kakuk Marci (1973)
- Time Masters (1982)
- Völegény (1982)
- The Red Countess (1985)
