= Dombóvár District =

Dombóvár District Dombóvári járás
- Districts of Hungary
- Coat of arms

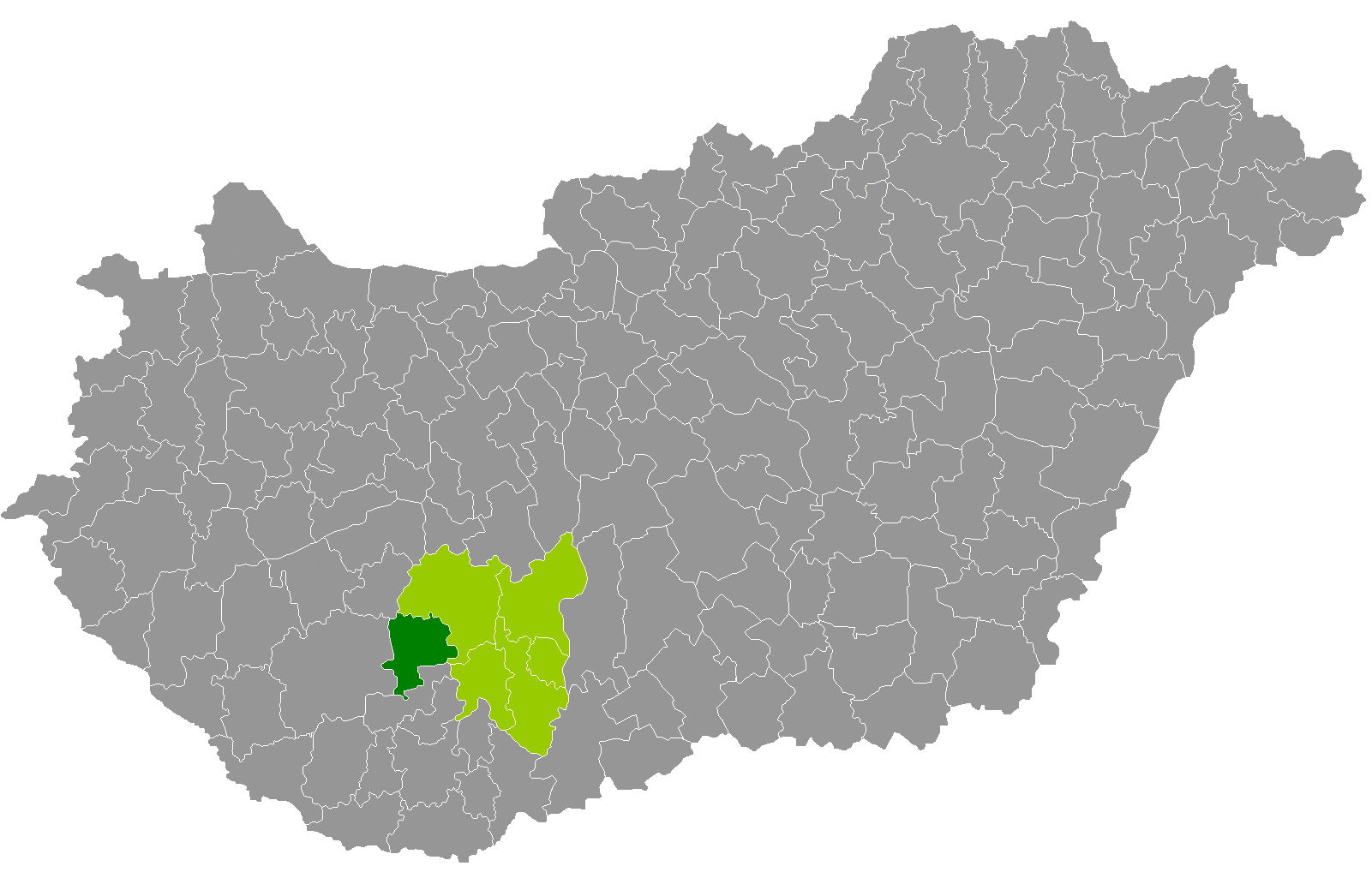
- Dombóvár District within Hungary and Tolna County.
- Coordinates: 46.38°N 18.14°E
- Country: Hungary
- County: Tolna
- District seat: Dombóvár

Area
  - Total: 509.02 km^{2} (196.53 sq mi)
  - Rank: 4th in Tolna

Population (2011 census)
  - Total: 32,331
  - Rank: 4th in Tolna
  - Density: 64/km^{2} (170/sq mi)

Dombóvár (Hungarian: Dombóvári járás) is a district in south-western part of Tolna County. Dombóvár is also the name of the town where the district seat is found. The district is located in the Southern Transdanubia Statistical Region.

== Geography ==
Dombóvár District borders with Tamási District to the north and east, Hegyhát District (Baranya County) to the south, Kaposvár District and Tab District (Somogy County) to the west. The number of the inhabited places in Dombóvár District is 16.

== Municipalities ==
The district has 1 town and 15 villages. (ordered by population, as of 1 January 2013)

- Attala (837)
- Csibrák (294)
- Csikóstőttős (852)
- Dalmand (1,259)
- **Dombóvár** (19,067) – district seat
- Döbrököz (2,026)
- Gyulaj (1,048)
- Jágónak (257)
- Kapospula (901)
- Kaposszekcső (1,504)
- Kocsola (1,303)
- Kurd (1,182)
- Lápafő (169)
- Nak (602)
- Szakcs (880)
- Várong (152)

The bolded municipality is city.

== See also ==
- List of cities and towns in Hungary
