= Iregszemcse =

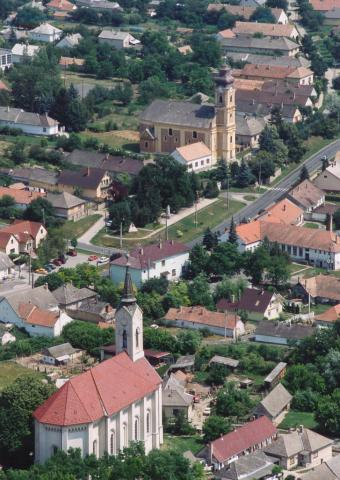
- Aerial view of Iregszemcse

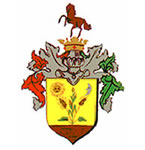
- Coat of arms

- Location of Iregszemcse
- Coordinates: 46.69768°N 18.18062°E
- Country: Hungary
- County: Tolna

Government
  - Mayor: Tóth Szabolcs

Area
  - Total: 58.33 km^{2} (22.52 sq mi)

Population (2017)
  - Total: 2,600
  - Density: 45/km^{2} (120/sq mi)
- Time zone: UTC+1 (CET)
  - Summer (DST): UTC+2 (CEST)
- Postal code: 7095
- Area code: 74

Iregszemcse, also called Ireg-Szemcse, is a village in Tolna County, Hungary.

== History ==
Iregszemcse was first mentioned in the articles of IV. Béla's abbey was a royal estate until 1387. Following a period where Hungary was controlled by the Ottoman Empire, it was resettled by Hungary nobleman Ádám Viczay in the 1600s.

The two villages Felső-Ireg and Szemcséd were joined in 1938.

On 15 January 2023, a mayoral election was held and saw Independent candidate Tóth Szabolcs win 434 votes (42.14%) out of five other independent candidates.

== Former co-operative farms ==
- Új Élet
- Rákóczi
- Újbarázda

== Nearby settlements ==
- Tamási
- Nagyszokoly
- Újireg
- Csehipuszta
- Okrádpuszta
- Hékútpuszta
- Medgyespuszta
- Fornádpuszta

== Sights ==
- Viczay-Kornfeld Castle (Hungarian: Viczay-Kornfeld kastély) (1820)
- Kornfeld Castle (Hungarian: Kornfeld kastély): Houses the Agronomy Institute of the MATE University
- Kálvária-kápolna: 15th-century gothic temple
