= HARC =

HARC may refer to:

- Houston Advanced Research Center
- Herkimer ARC, a chapter of The Arc New York

== See also ==
- Harc, a village in Tolna County, Hungary
- H:ARC, the shortcut to Help:Archiving a talk page
