= Tolna District =

Coordinates: 46.42260779260526°N 18.7685640909405°E

Tolna District Tolnai járás
- Districts of Hungary
- Coat of arms

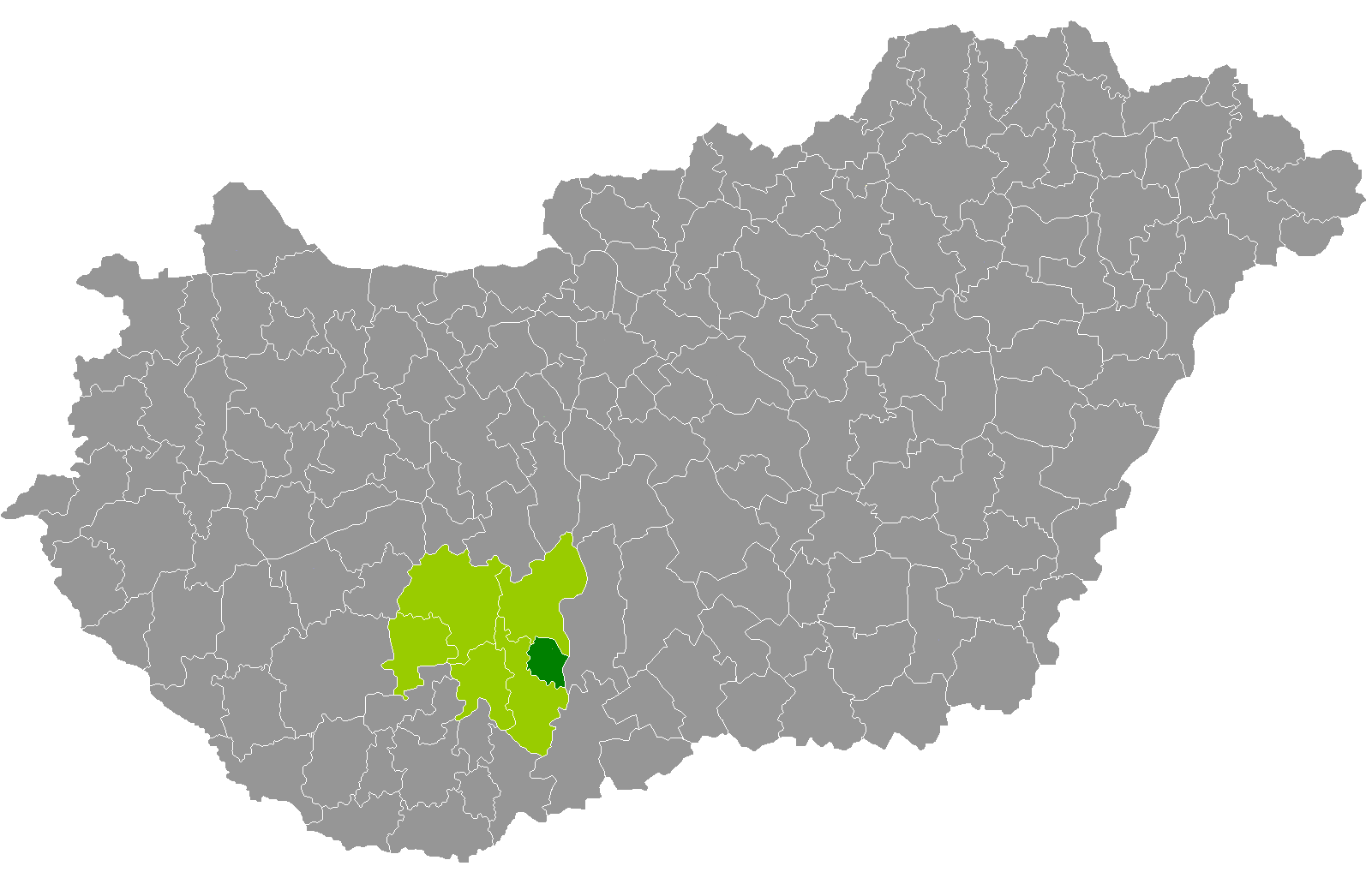
- Tolna District within Hungary and Tolna County.
- Country: Hungary
- County: Tolna
- District seat: Tolna (town)

Area
  - Total: 205.24 km^{2} (79.24 sq mi)
  - Rank: 6th in Tolna

Population (2011 census)
  - Total: 18,203
  - Rank: 6th in Tolna
  - Density: 89/km^{2} (230/sq mi)

Tolna (Hungarian: Tolnai járás) is a district in eastern part of Tolna County. Tolna is also the name of the town where the district seat is found. The district is located in the Southern Transdanubia Statistical Region.

== Geography ==
Tolna District borders with Paks District to the north, Kalocsa District (Bács-Kiskun County) to the east, Szekszárd District to the south and west. The number of the inhabited places in Tolna District is 4.

== Municipalities ==
The district has 1 town, 1 large village and 2 villages. (ordered by population, as of 1 January 2013)

- Bogyiszló (1,038)
- Fadd (2,289)
- Fácánkert (411)
- **Tolna** (13,758) – district seat

The bolded municipality is city, italics municipality is large village.

== See also ==
- List of cities and towns in Hungary
