= Iovia =

Iovia or Jovia (Latin for "Jovian", "of Jupiter") may refer to:

- Aegyptus Iovia, late Roman province
- Legio V Iovia, Roman legion levied by Diocletian
- Legio I Iovia, Roman legion levied by Diocletian
- Iovia (Botivo), late Roman city in Pannonia, now Ludbreg, Croatia
- Iovia (Alsóhetény), late Roman site in Pannonia, now in Kapospula, Hungary
