= Kajdacs =

- Location of Tolna county in Hungary

- Location of Kajdacs
- Coordinates: 46.56215°N 18.62441°E
- Country: Hungary
- County: Tolna

Area
  - Total: 37.73 km^{2} (14.57 sq mi)

Population (2004)
  - Total: 1,338
  - Density: 35.46/km^{2} (91.8/sq mi)
- Time zone: UTC+1 (CET)
  - Summer (DST): UTC+2 (CEST)
- Postal code: 7051
- Area code: 75

Kajdacs is a village in Tolna County, Hungary.
