= Miszla =

- Location of Tolna county in Hungary

- Location of Miszla
- Coordinates: 46.63058°N 18.47968°E
- Country: Hungary
- County: Tolna

Area
  - Total: 34.72 km^{2} (13.41 sq mi)

Population (2004)
  - Total: 332
  - Density: 9.56/km^{2} (24.8/sq mi)
- Time zone: UTC+1 (CET)
  - Summer (DST): UTC+2 (CEST)
- Postal code: 7065
- Area code: 74

Miszla is a village in Tolna County, Hungary.

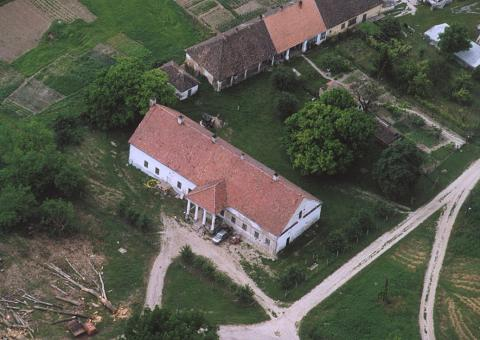
Aerial photography of Miszla
