= Felsőnyék =

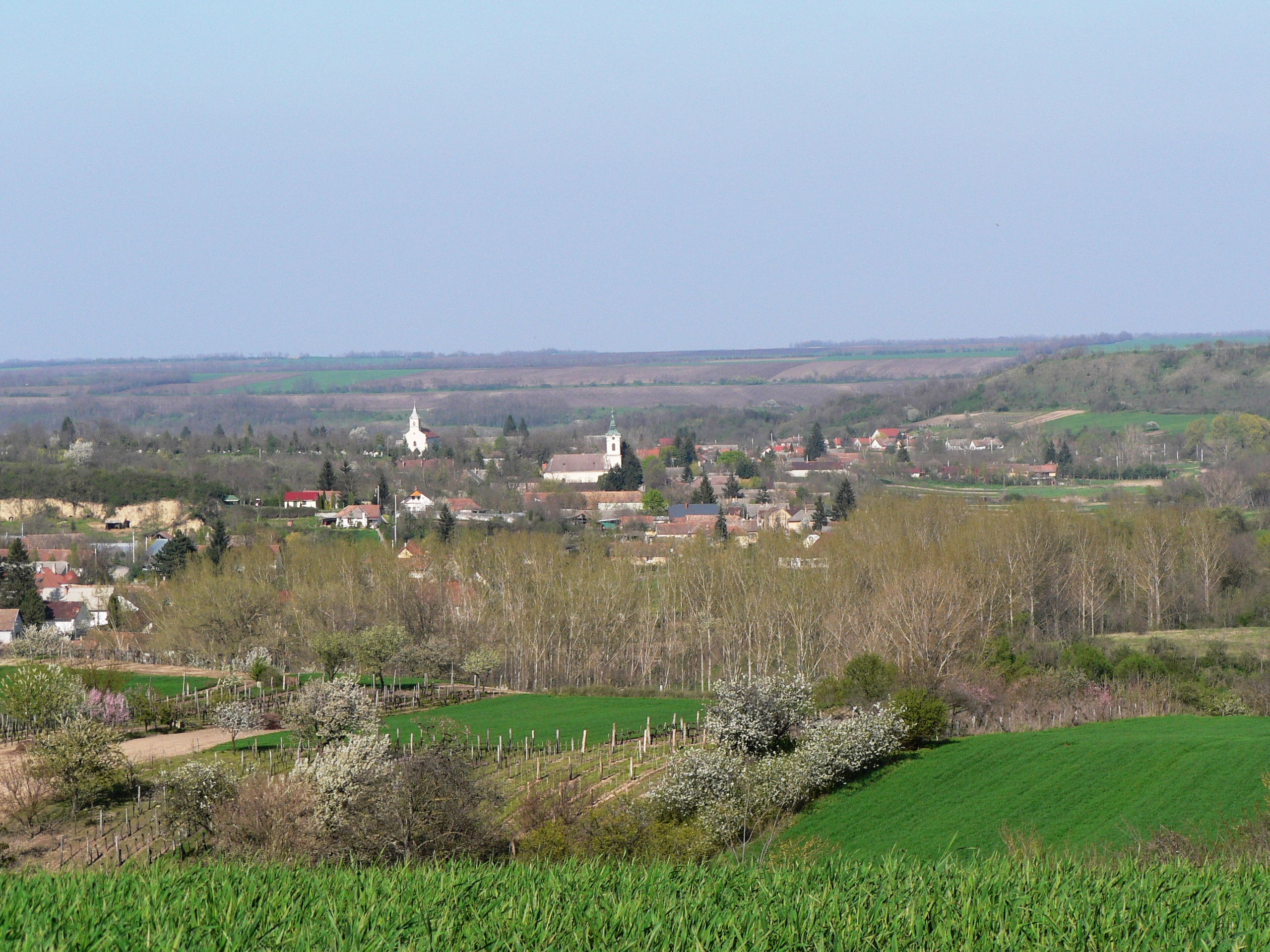

- Location of Tolna county in Hungary

- Location of Felsőnyék
- Coordinates: 46°47′19″N 18°17′27″E
- Country: Hungary
- County: Tolna

Area
  - Total: 32.0 km^{2} (12.4 sq mi)

Population (2011)
  - Total: 1,039
  - Density: 32.5/km^{2} (84.1/sq mi)
- Time zone: UTC+1 (CET)
  - Summer (DST): UTC+2 (CEST)
- Postal code: 7099
- Area code: 74

Felsőnyék is a village in Tolna county, Hungary.
