= Dúzs =

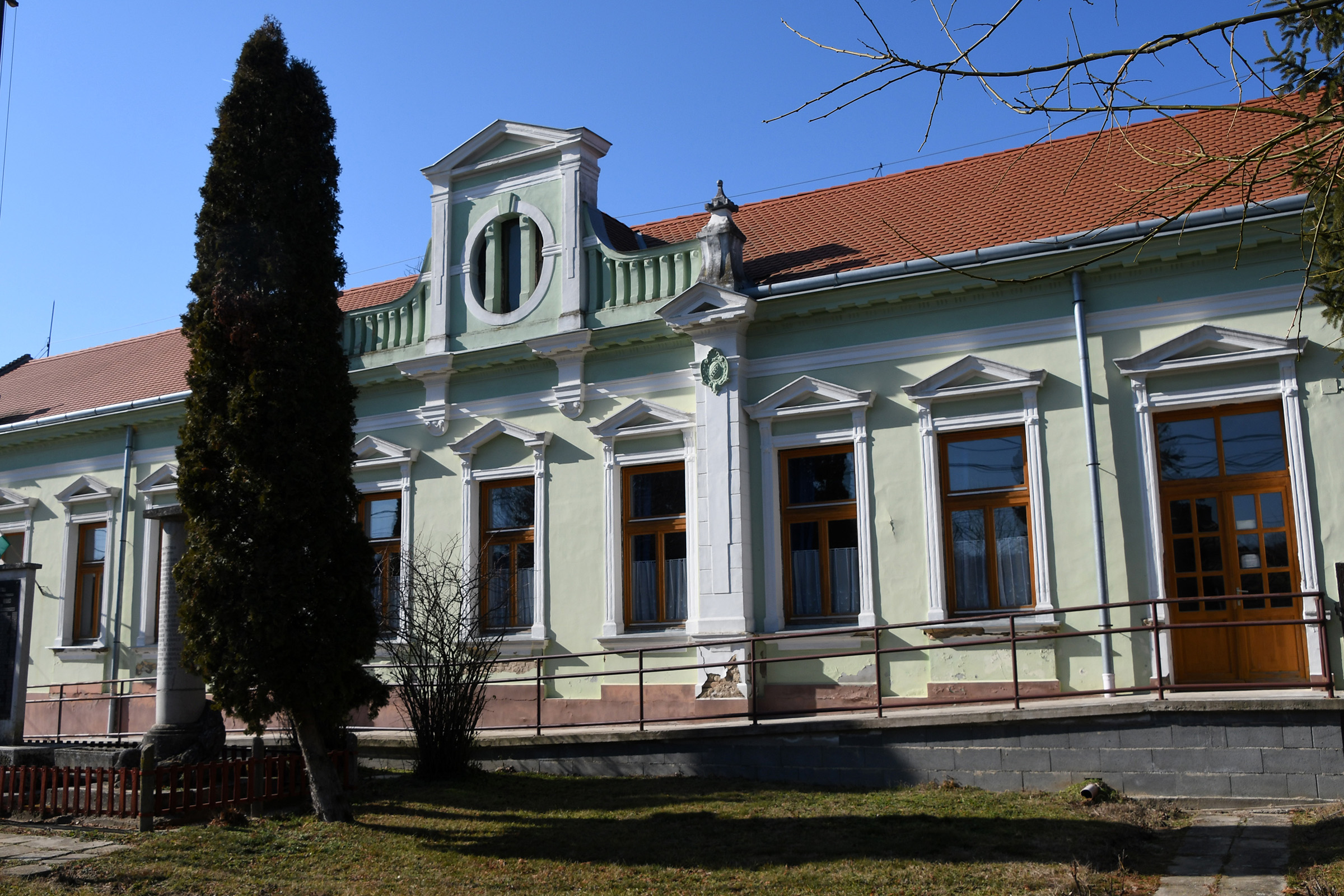
- Village hall

- Coat of arms

- Location of Dúzs in Hungary
- Coordinates: 46.48895°N 18.37985°E
- Country: Hungary
- Region: Southern Transdanubia
- County: Tolna
- Subregion: Tamási
- Rank: Village

Area
  - Total: 11.27 km^{2} (4.35 sq mi)

Population (1 January 2008)
  - Total: 276
  - Density: 24.5/km^{2} (63.4/sq mi)
- Time zone: UTC+1 (CET)
  - Summer (DST): UTC+2 (CEST)
- Postal code: 7224
- Area code: +36 74
- KSH code: 19202
- Website: https://www.duzs.hu/

Dúzs is a village in Tolna County, Hungary.
