= Belecska =

- Location of Tolna county in Hungary

- Location of Belecska
- Coordinates: 46.64227°N 18.41871°E
- Country: Hungary
- County: Tolna

Area
  - Total: 14.4 km^{2} (5.6 sq mi)

Population (2004)
  - Total: 451
  - Density: 31.31/km^{2} (81.1/sq mi)
- Time zone: UTC+1 (CET)
  - Summer (DST): UTC+2 (CEST)
- Postal code: 7061
- Area code: 74

Belecska is a village in Tolna County, Hungary.
