= Sárpilis =

- Coat of arms

- Location of Sárpilis in Hungary
- Coordinates: 46°15′00″N 18°44′26″E
- Country: Hungary
- Region: Southern Transdanubia
- County: Tolna

Area
  - Total: 21.7 km^{2} (8.4 sq mi)

Population (2011)
  - Total: 690
  - Density: 32/km^{2} (82/sq mi)
- Time zone: UTC+1 (CET)
  - Summer (DST): UTC+2 (CEST)
- Postal code: 7145
- Area code: +36 74
- Website: www.sarpilis.hu

Sárpilis is a village in Tolna county, Hungary.
