= Varsád =

- Coat of arms

- Location of Varsád in Hungary
- Coordinates: 46°31′18″N 18°31′23″E
- Country: Hungary
- Region: Southern Transdanubia
- County: Tolna

Area
  - Total: 21.6 km^{2} (8.3 sq mi)

Population (2011)
  - Total: 364
  - Density: 16.9/km^{2} (43.6/sq mi)
- Time zone: UTC+1 (CET)
  - Summer (DST): UTC+2 (CEST)
- Postal code: 7067
- Area code: +36 74
- Website: www.varsad.hu

Varsád is a village in Tolna county, Hungary.
