= Tolna, Hungary =

Tolna
- Town
- Flag Coat of arms
- Interactive map of Tolna
- Location of Tolna, Hungary
- Coordinates: 46.42363°N 18.79025°E
- Country: Hungary
- County: Tolna
- District: Tolna (district)

Area
  - Total: 71.08 km^{2} (27.44 sq mi)

Population (2010)
  - Total: 11,518
  - Density: 162.0/km^{2} (419.7/sq mi)
- Time zone: UTC+1 (CET)
  - Summer (DST): UTC+2 (CEST)
- Postal code: 7130
- Area code: (+36) 74
- Website: www.tolna.hu

Tolna (German: Tolnau; Latin: Alta Ripa) is a town in Tolna County, Hungary. It lies about 10 kilometres (6 miles) north of Szekszárd and 135 kilometres (84 miles) south of Budapest.

== History ==
The area around Tolna was already settled in Roman times, when the Romans likely built a border fort here called Alta Ripa, which was later eroded by the Danube in the post-Roman era. During the reign of the Árpád dynasty in Hungary, the settlement was called Thelena and was later renamed Tolna.

== Notable residents ==
- Piali Pasha (1515-1578), Ottoman admiral who was allegedly from the town before being kidnapped

== Twin towns – sister cities ==
Tolna is twinned with:

- Ozun, Romania
- Palić (Subotica), Serbia
- Stutensee, Germany
