= Értény =

- Coat of arms

- Location of Értény in Hungary
- Coordinates: 46.60920°N 18.13570°E
- Country: Hungary
- Region: Southern Transdanubia
- County: Tolna
- Subregion: Tamási
- Rank: Village

Area
  - Total: 29.95 km^{2} (11.56 sq mi)

Population (1 January 2008)
  - Total: 780
  - Density: 26/km^{2} (67/sq mi)
- Time zone: UTC+1 (CET)
  - Summer (DST): UTC+2 (CEST)
- Postal code: 7093
- Area code: +36 74
- KSH code: 08448
- Website: http://www.értény.hu

Értény is a village in Tolna County, Hungary.
