= Nagykónyi =

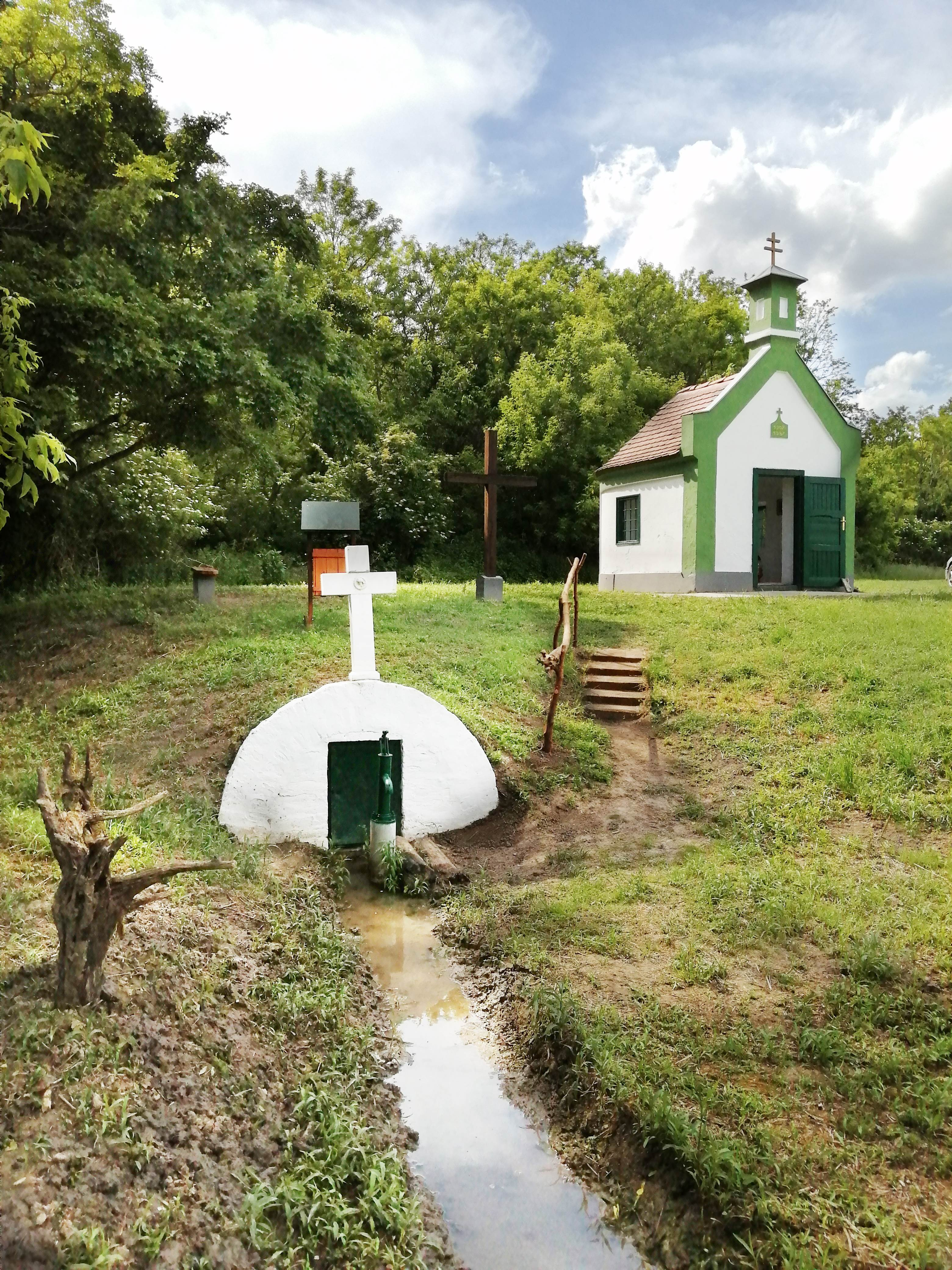
- Chapel of Saint Roch

- Coat of arms

- Location within Hungary
- Coordinates: 46°35′39″N 18°12′03″E
- Country: Hungary
- County: Tolna

Area
  - Total: 47.8 km^{2} (18.5 sq mi)

Population (2011)
  - Total: 1,111
  - Density: 23.2/km^{2} (60.2/sq mi)
- Time zone: UTC+1 (CET)
  - Summer (DST): UTC+2 (CEST)
- Postal code: 7092
- Area code: 74

Nagykónyi is a village in Tolna County, Hungary.

It was once settled by Danube Swabians. Around 1865–1880, several Danube Swabian from the Tolna settled in Slavonia, several families from Nagykónyi went to Slavonia and settled there.
