= Sárszentlőrinc =

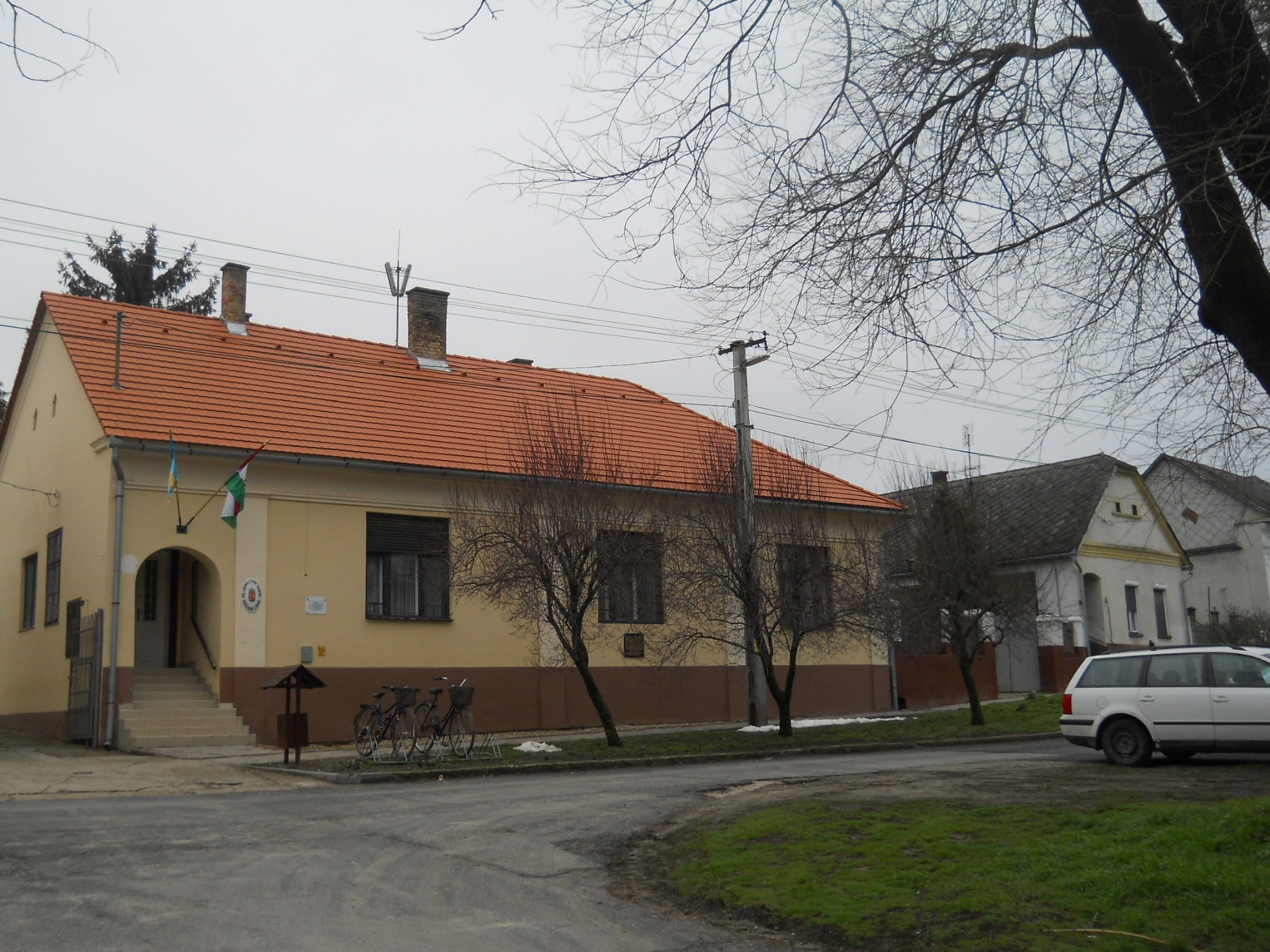
- Village hall

- Coat of arms

- Location of Sárszentlőrinc in Hungary
- Coordinates: 46°37′26″N 18°36′18″E
- Country: Hungary
- Region: Southern Transdanubia
- County: Tolna

Area
  - Total: 46.7 km^{2} (18.0 sq mi)

Population (2011)
  - Total: 941
  - Density: 20.1/km^{2} (52.2/sq mi)
- Time zone: UTC+1 (CET)
  - Summer (DST): UTC+2 (CEST)
- Postal code: 7047
- Area code: +36 74
- Website: http://www.sarszentlorinc.hu

Sárszentlőrinc is a village in Tolna county, Hungary founded in 1722.
