= Regöly =

- Coat of arms

- Location of Regöly in Hungary
- Coordinates: 46°34′43″N 18°23′26″E
- Country: Hungary
- Region: Southern Transdanubia
- County: Tolna

Area
  - Total: 62.6 km^{2} (24.2 sq mi)

Population (2011)
  - Total: 1,109
  - Density: 17.7/km^{2} (45.9/sq mi)
- Time zone: UTC+1 (CET)
  - Summer (DST): UTC+2 (CEST)
- Postal code: 7090 7193
- Area code: +36 74
- Website: www.regoly.hu

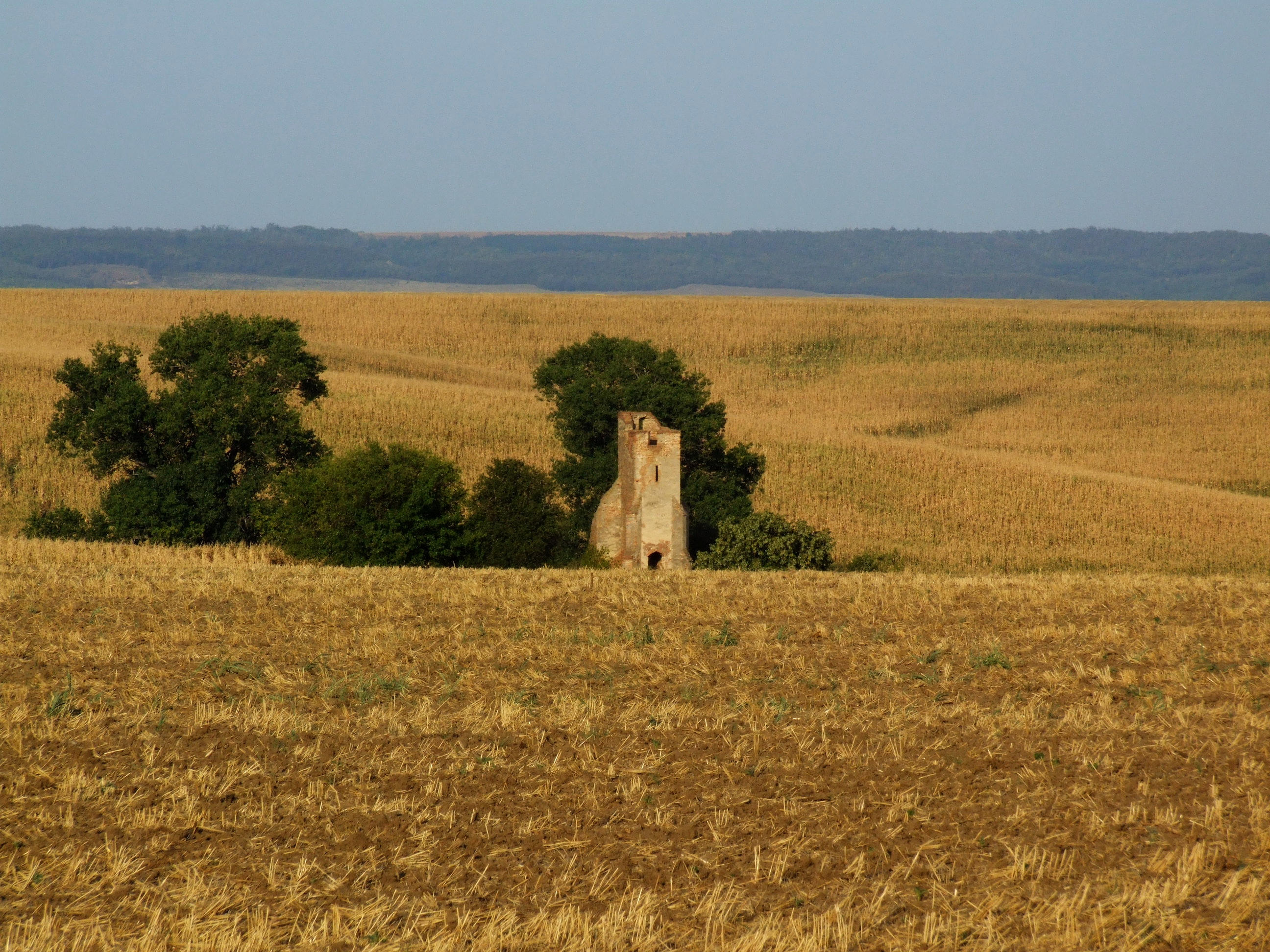
Ruins of gothic church near Regöly

Regöly is a village in Tolna county, Hungary.
