= Pálfa =

- Coat of arms

- Location within Hungary
- Coordinates: 46°42′43″N 18°36′47″E
- Country: Hungary
- County: Tolna

Area
  - Total: 34.7 km^{2} (13.4 sq mi)

Population (2025)
  - Total: 1,398
  - Density: 40.3/km^{2} (104/sq mi)
- Time zone: UTC+1 (CET)
  - Summer (DST): UTC+2 (CEST)
- Postal code: 7042
- Area code: 74

Pálfa is a village in Tolna county, Hungary.
