= Báta =

- Village
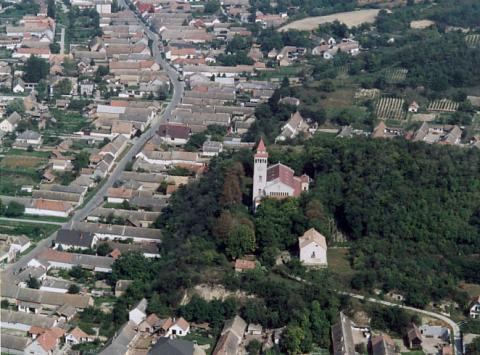
- Aerial view of Báta

- Coat of arms

- Location of Báta in Hungary
- Coordinates: 46.12640°N 18.77167°E
- Country: Hungary
- Region: Southern Transdanubia
- County: Tolna
- Subregion: Szekszárdi
- Rank: Village

Government
  - Mayor: Sziebert György

Area
  - Total: 66.17 km^{2} (25.55 sq mi)

Population (1 January 2008)
  - Total: 1,767
  - Density: 26.70/km^{2} (69.16/sq mi)
- Time zone: UTC+1 (CET)
  - Summer (DST): UTC+2 (CEST)
- Postal code: 7149
- Area code: +36 74
- KSH code: 11712
- Website: www.bata.hu

Báta is a village in Tolna County, Hungary.
