= Kalaznó =

- Location of Tolna county in Hungary

- Location within Hungary
- Coordinates: 46°30′04″N 18°28′33″E
- Country: Hungary
- County: Tolna

Area
  - Total: 18.3 km^{2} (7.1 sq mi)

Population (2011)
  - Total: 167
  - Density: 9.13/km^{2} (23.6/sq mi)
- Time zone: UTC+1 (CET)
  - Summer (DST): UTC+2 (CEST)
- Postal code: 7194
- Area code: 74

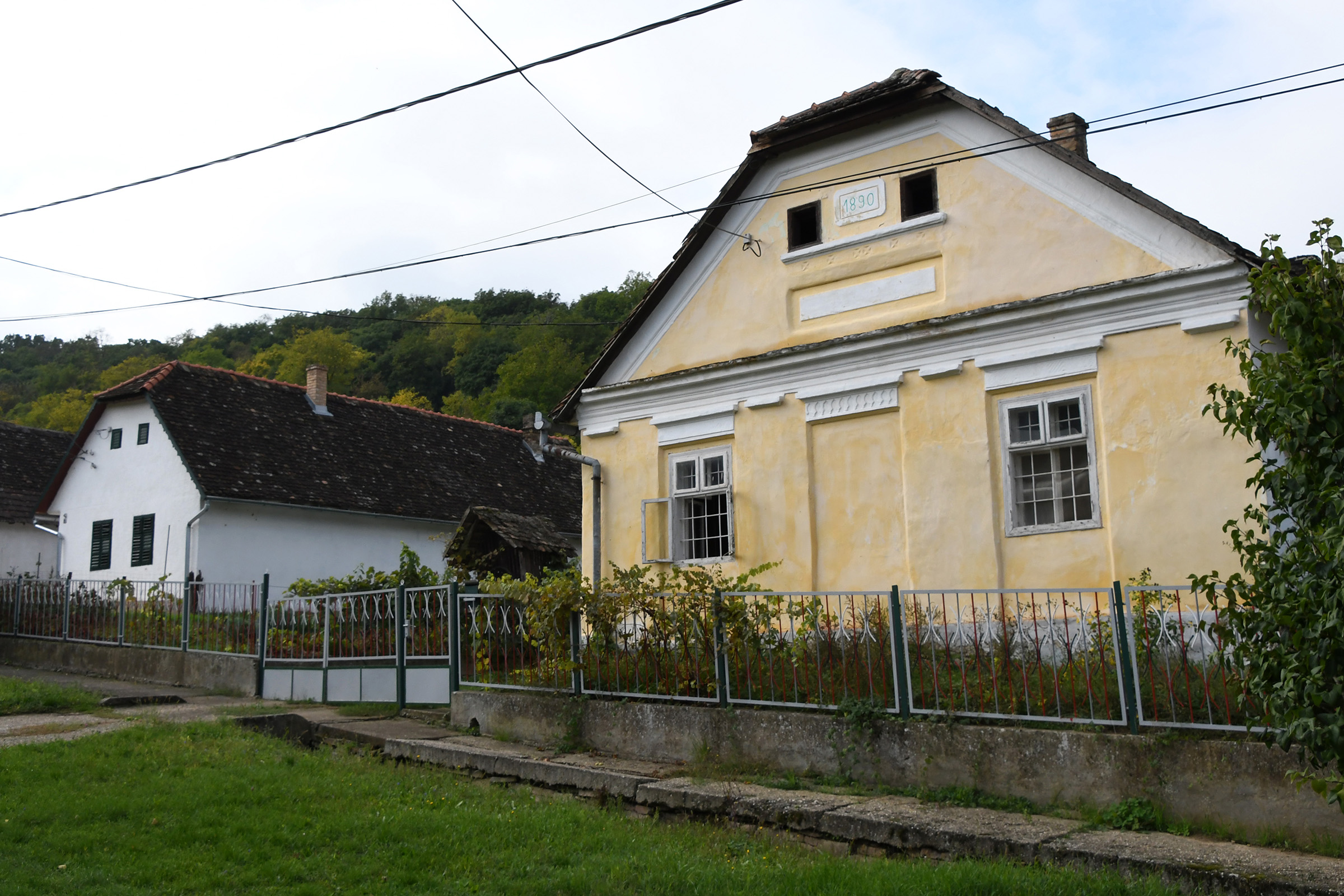
Kalaznó

Kalaznó is a village in Tolna county, Hungary.
