= Mucsi =

- Location of Tolna county in Hungary

- Location of Mucsi
- Coordinates: 46.42998°N 18.39432°E
- Country: Hungary
- County: Tolna

Area
  - Total: 24.76 km^{2} (9.56 sq mi)

Population (2004)
  - Total: 554
  - Density: 22.37/km^{2} (57.9/sq mi)
- Time zone: UTC+1 (CET)
  - Summer (DST): UTC+2 (CEST)
- Postal code: 7195
- Area code: 74

Mucsi is a village in Tolna County, Hungary. The former German name was Mutsching.

From about four hundred German settlements in Hungary, Mucsi was one of only twenty-four which were repopulated after the 150-year-long Turkish occupation. The new settlers were peasants and artisans from around Fulda in the Hessen province of Germany and were described as Stifollers - from Stift Fulda. They undertook the major part of the reconstruction of the almost entirely destroyed country and established a high standard of agricultural and industrial society.

In the year 1703 Mucsi was inhabited. Nine farmers and their families lived in the village. After the [Ferenc] Rákóczi struggle for [Hungarian] independence [1703-1711], the village had no inhabitants. In 1720 eleven families settled there, including Hungarians, Slavs and Germans. The first organized wave of [German] immigrants reached Mucsi in 1721. Count Sinzendorf introduced the settling of the village by Germans, but it was carried out under the direction of Count Mercy. Following the concept of establishing new villages, colonists with the same religion and nationality were settled in one village.

Thus, the localities were divided into two large groups: German and Hungarian places. It was the same whether a village was Protestant or Catholic. Mucsi was a purely Catholic village. The few Hungarians moved out. In Tolna County in Mucsi and in Závod the population was predominantly “Stiffolders.” These immigrants came from the Diocese [Stift] of Fulda in Germany. It is in a hilly area of Germany. The 30 Years War led to a depletion of the German population. Because of that, it is no surprise that the people wanted to begin a new life.

Mucsi and the other Fulda villages received emigrants from those localities. After their immigration the Fulda colonists quickly became accustomed to their new homeland. In addition, the colonists like other German Hungarians bore the common name Swabians and Stiffolders. The dialect of the Stiffolders was recognized as an independent dialect. This group of people maintained not only their dialect but also their customs far away from their homeland, and they also kept the recipe for “Fulda sausage.” In Mucsi a Fulda settlement developed over the course of two centuries, as well as in other areas of Hungary where the Danube Swabians settled. For more information and sources, follow this link - http://www.dvhh.org/musci/
