= Szakály, Hungary =

Szakály
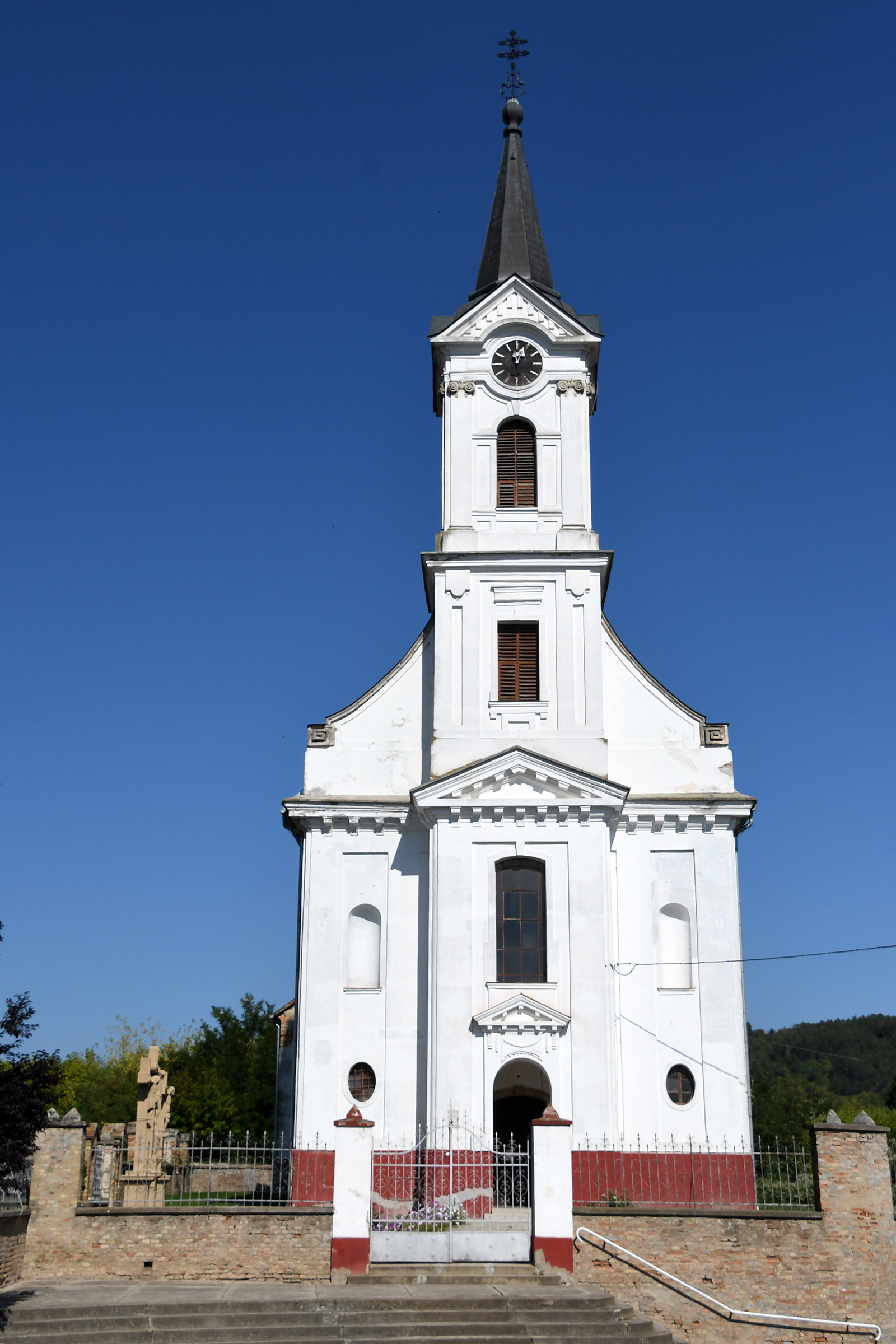
- A catholic church

- Location of Szálka in Hungary
- Coordinates: 46°31′28″N 18°22′47″E
- Country: Hungary
- Region: Southern Transdanubia
- County: Tolna

Government
  - Mayor: Ferenc Péter Törő

Area
  - Total: 41.01 km^{2} (15.83 sq mi)

Population (2015)
  - Total: 1,352
  - Density: 32.97/km^{2} (85.39/sq mi)
- Time zone: UTC+1 (CET)
  - Summer (DST): UTC+2 (CEST)
- Postal code: 7192
- Area code: +36 74

Szakály is a village in Tolna County, Hungary.
