= Koppányszántó =

- Location of Tolna county in Hungary

- Location within Hungary
- Coordinates: 46°35′36″N 18°06′35″E
- Country: Hungary
- County: Tolna

Area
  - Total: 22.5 km^{2} (8.7 sq mi)

Population (2011)
  - Total: 308
  - Density: 13.7/km^{2} (35.5/sq mi)
- Time zone: UTC+1 (CET)
  - Summer (DST): UTC+2 (CEST)
- Postal code: 7094
- Area code: 74

Koppányszántó is a village in Tolna county, Hungary.
