= Diósberény =

- Location of Tolna county in Hungary

- Location of Diósberény
- Coordinates: 46.53228°N 18.44334°E
- Country: Hungary
- County: Tolna

Area
  - Total: 17.75 km^{2} (6.85 sq mi)

Population (2004)
  - Total: 387
  - Density: 21.8/km^{2} (56/sq mi)
- Time zone: UTC+1 (CET)
  - Summer (DST): UTC+2 (CEST)
- Postal code: 7072
- Area code: 74

Diósberény is a village in Tolna County, Hungary.

It is situated in the middle of Tolna county, in equal distance from Paks, the town of the atomic power station, Szekszárd, the capital of Tolna county and Dombóvár. It has only 400 inhabitants, but there is a telecottage run by the Association for Diosbereny, where everyone can use the Internet, make photocopies, use the computers and it is also a good place for the young people of the village to gather.
