= Szárazd =

- Coat of arms

- Location of Szárazd in Hungary
- Coordinates: 46°34′29″N 18°25′33″E
- Country: Hungary
- Region: Southern Transdanubia
- County: Tolna

Area
  - Total: 7.8 km^{2} (3.0 sq mi)

Population (2011)
  - Total: 250
  - Density: 32/km^{2} (83/sq mi)
- Time zone: UTC+1 (CET)
  - Summer (DST): UTC+2 (CEST)
- Postal code: 7063
- Area code: +36 74
- Website: http://szarazd.hu/

Szárazd is a village in Tolna county, Hungary.
