= Tolna County =

County of Hungary

Tolna County Tolna megye
- Counties of Hungary
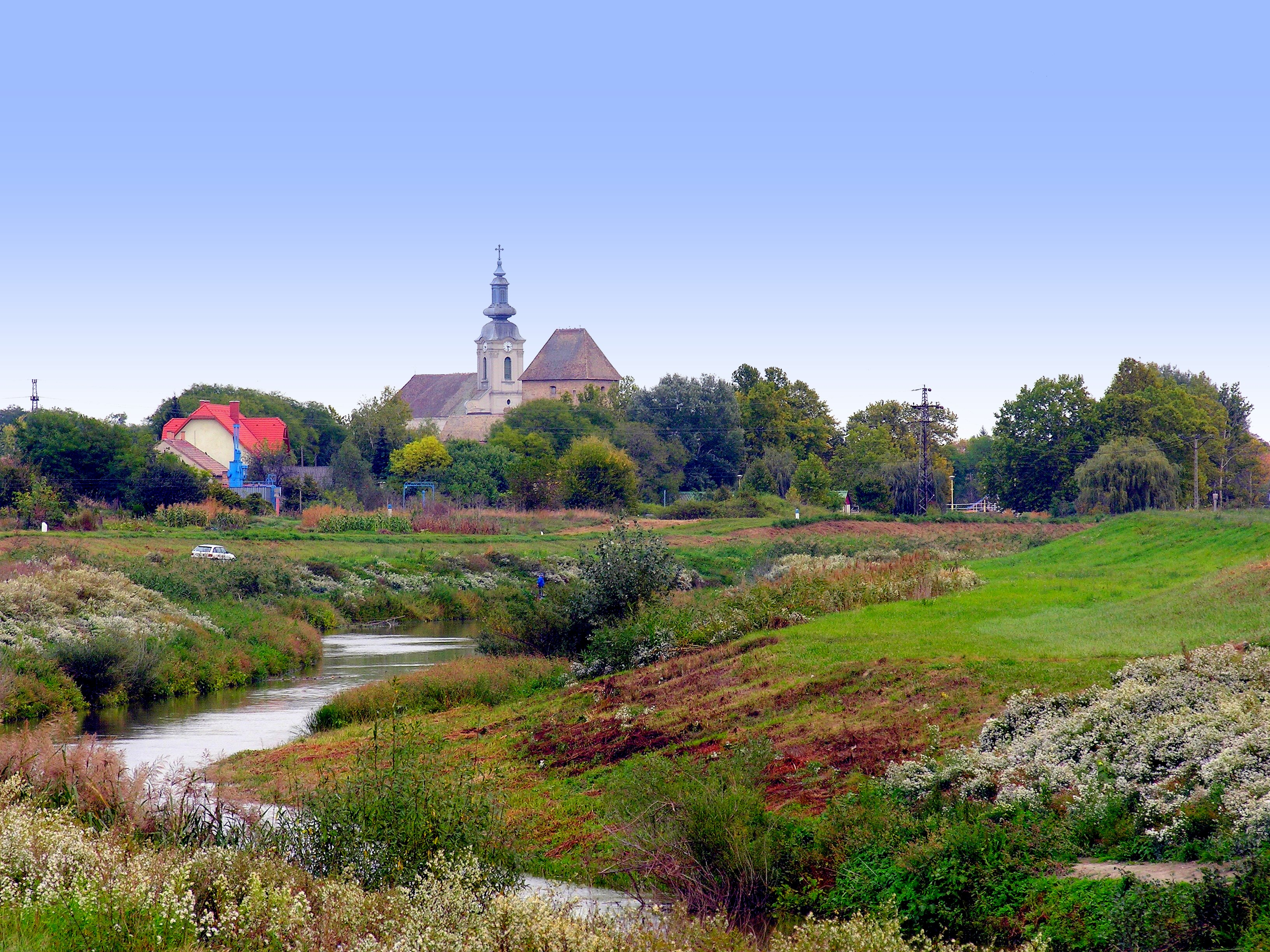
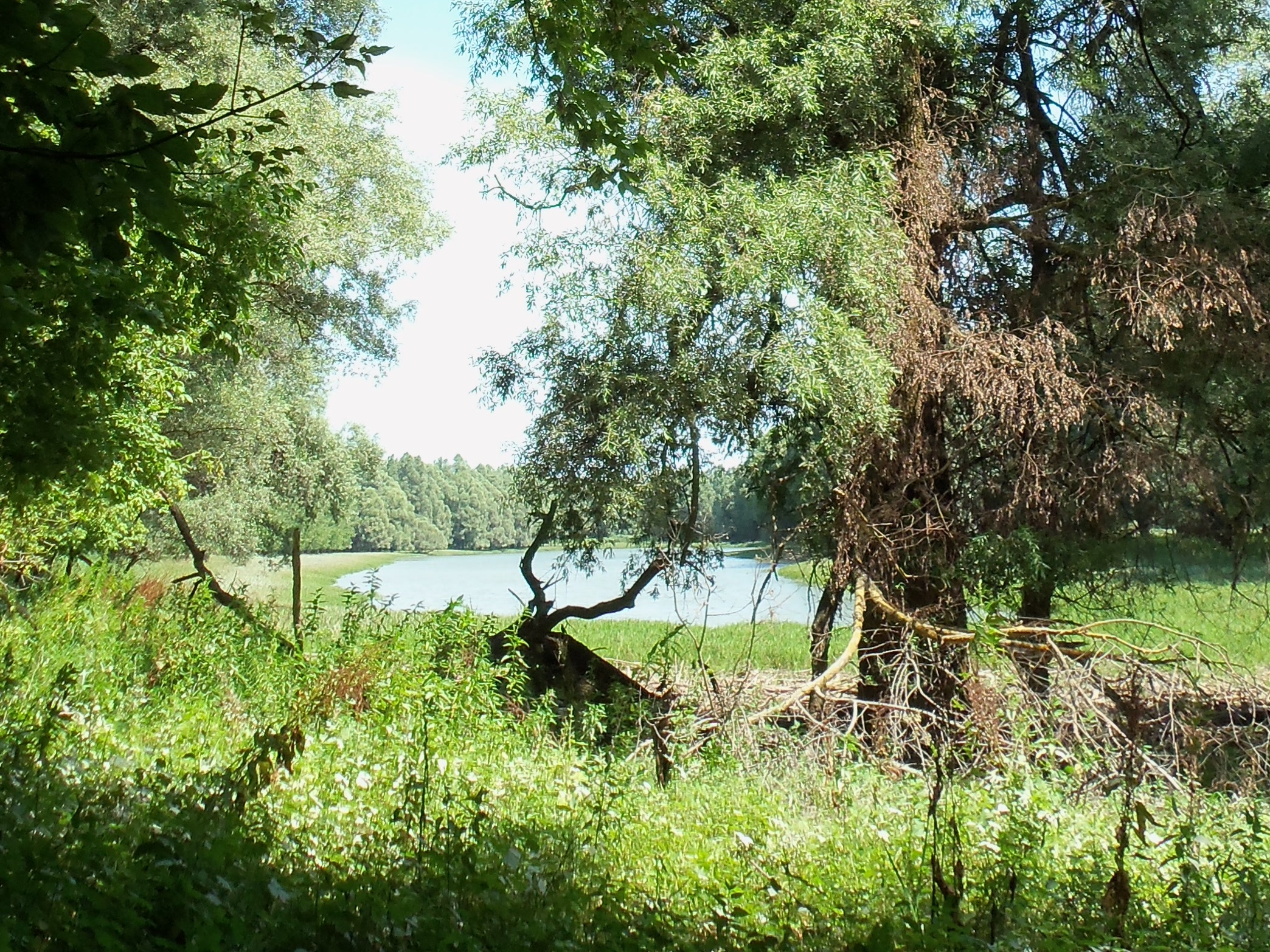
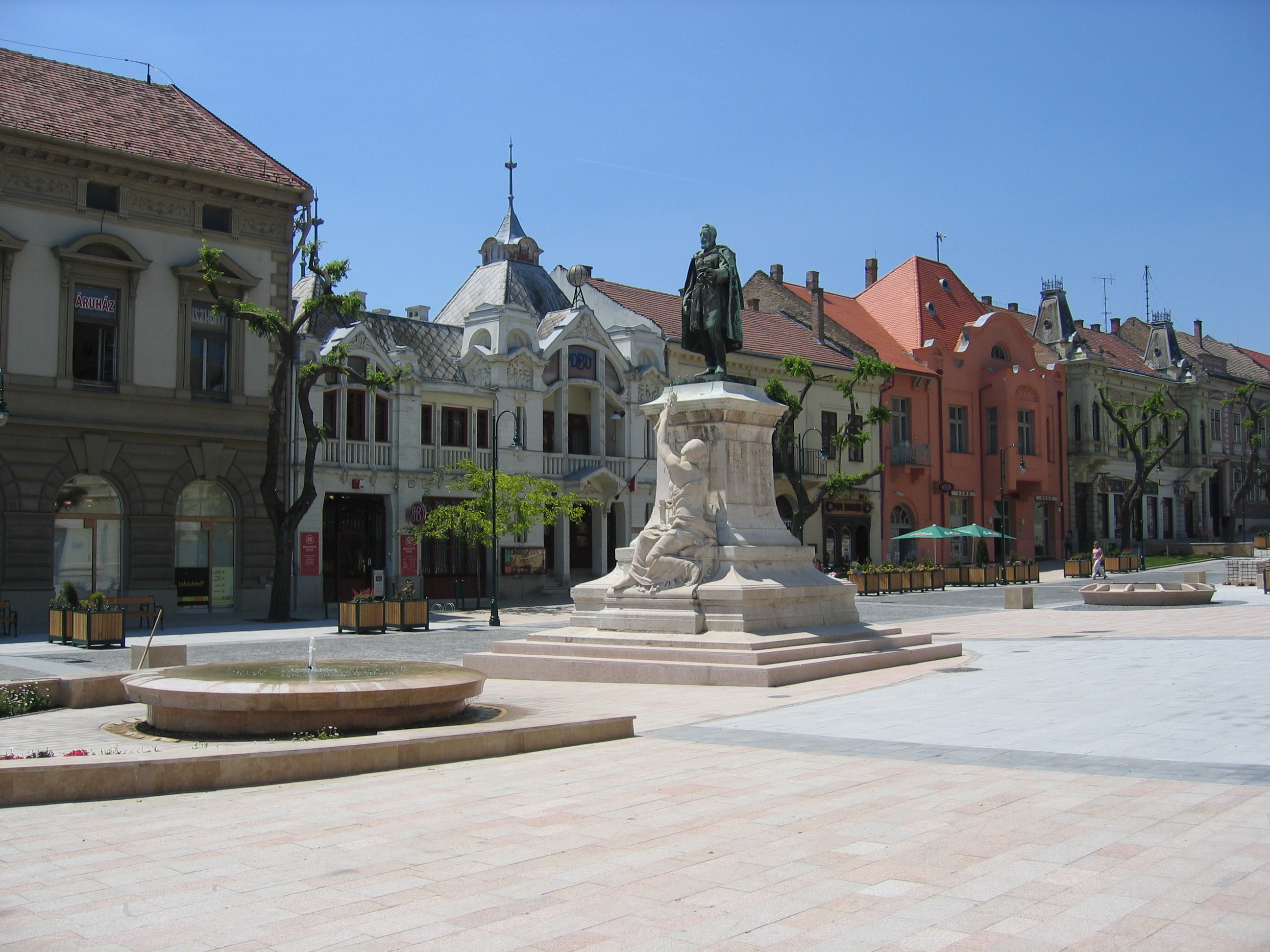
- Descending, from top: View of Simontornya, Landscape in Gemenc forest, and Downtown of Szekszárd

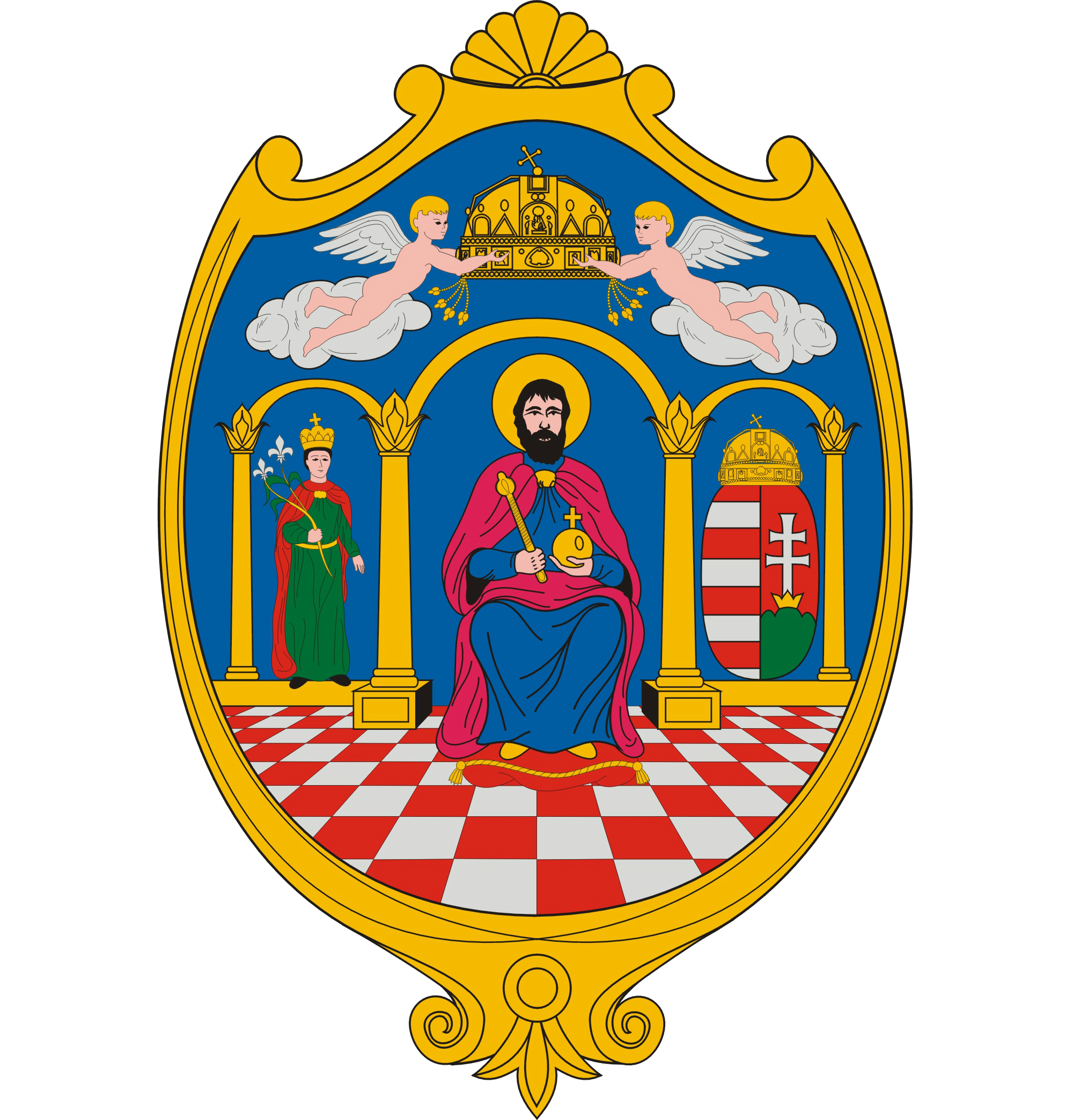
- Flag Coat of arms

- Tolna County within Hungary
- Coordinates: 46°30′N 18°35′E
- Country: Hungary
- Region: Southern Transdanubia
- County seat: Szekszárd
- Districts: 6 districts: Bonyhád District; Dombóvár District; Paks District; Szekszárd District; Tamási District; Tolna District

Government
  - President of the General Assembly: Tamás Fehérvári (Fidesz-KDNP)

Area
  - Total: 3,703.16 km^{2} (1,429.80 sq mi)
  - Rank: 15th in Hungary

Population (2018)
  - Total: 219,317
  - Rank: 18th in Hungary
  - Density: 59.2243/km^{2} (153.390/sq mi)

GDP
  - Total: HUF 592 billion €1.900 billion (2016)
- Postal code: 702x – 7252, 7352 – 7361
- Area code(s): (+36) 74, 75
- ISO 3166 code: HU-TO
- Website: www.tolnamegye.hu

Tolna (Hungarian: Tolna megye, pronounced [ˈtolnɒ]; German: Komitat Tolnau) is an administrative county (comitatus or megye) in present-day Hungary as it was in the former Kingdom of Hungary. It lies in central Hungary, on the west bank of the river Danube. It shares borders with the Hungarian counties of Somogy, Fejér, Bács-Kiskun, and Baranya. The capital of Tolna county is Szekszárd. Its area is 3,703 km^{2} (1,430 sq mi).

== History ==
Tolna (in Latin: comitatus Tolnensis) was also the name of a historic administrative county (comitatus) of the Kingdom of Hungary. Its territory, which was about the same as that of the present Tolna county, is now in central Hungary. The capital of the county was Szekszárd.

== Demographics ==
Religion in Tolna County (2022 census – of those who declared their religion (62.2%))
1. Roman Catholic (56.0%)
2. Calvinistic (10.8%)
3. Lutheran (4.20%)
4. Other Christian denomination (3.80%)
5. Other religion (0.30%)
6. Not religious (24.9%)

In 2015, Tolna had a population of 225,936 and the population density was 61 inhabitants per square kilometre (160/sq mi).

Year	County population	Change
1949	275,644	n/a
1960	▼272,101	-1.29%
1970	▼258,760	-4.90%
1980	▲266,273	2.90%
1990	▼253,675	-4.73%
2001	▼249,683	-1.57%
2011	▼230,361	-7.74%
2015	▼225,936	-1.95%
2018	▼219,317	-3.01%

=== Ethnicity ===
Besides the Hungarian majority, the main minorities are the Germans (approx. 10,000) and Roma (8,500).

Total population (2011 census): 230,361
Ethnic groups (2011 census): Identified themselves: 214,953 persons:

- Hungarians: 194,685 (90,57%)
- Germans: 10,195 (4,74%)
- Roma: 8,768 (4,08%)
- Others and indefinable: 1 305 (0,61%)

Approx. 32,000 persons in Tolna County did not declare their ethnic group at the 2011 census.

=== Religion ===
Religious adherence in the county according to 2011 census:

- Catholic – 108,755 (Roman Catholic – 108,392; Greek Catholic – 331)
- Reformed – 18,533;
- Evangelical – 6,800;
- Other religions – 2,734;
- Non-religious – 35,803;
- Atheism – 2,194;
- Undeclared – 55,542.

== Regional structure ==
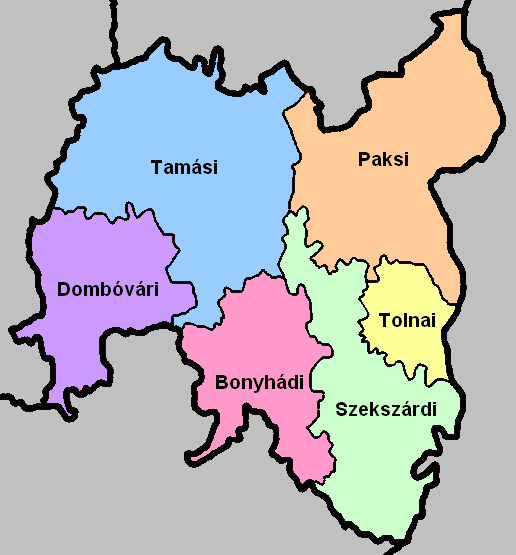
District of Tolna County

No.	English and Hungarian names	Area (km^{2})	Population (2011)	Density (pop./km^{2})	Seat	No. of municipalities
1	Bonyhád District; Bonyhádi járás	476.77	31,567	66	Bonyhád	25
2	Dombóvár District; Dombóvári járás	509.02	32,331	64	Dombóvár	16
3	Paks District; Paksi járás	836.00	49,433	59	Paks	15
4	Szekszárd District; Szekszárdi járás	656.18	60,122	92	Szekszárd	17
5	Tamási District; Tamási járás	1,019.94	38,705	38	Tamási	32
6	Tolna District; Tolnai járás	205.24	18,203	89	Tolna (town)	4
Tolna County		3,703.16	231,183	64	Szekszárd	109

== Politics ==
The Tolna County Council, elected at the 2024 local government elections, is made up of 15 counselors, with the following party composition:

Party	Seats	Current County Assembly
Fidesz-KDNP	11	
Our Homeland Movement	2	
Democratic Coalition	1	
Momentum Movement	1	

=== Presidents of the General Assembly ===
List of presidents since 1990
Tamás Fehérvári (Fidesz-KDNP)	2014–

== Municipalities ==
Tolna County has 1 urban county, 10 towns, 5 large villages and 93 villages.

City with county rights

(ordered by population, as of 2011 census)

- Szekszárd (34,296) – county seat

Towns

- Paks (19,369)
- Dombóvár (19,010)
- Bonyhád (13,630)
- Tolna (11,126)
- Dunaföldvár (8,775)
- Tamási (8,349)
- Bátaszék (6,370)
- Simontornya (4,057)
- Nagymányok (2,338)
- Gyönk (2,052)

Villages

- Alsónána
- Alsónyék
- Aparhant
- Attala
- Báta
- Bátaapáti
- Belecska
- Bikács
- Bogyiszló
- Bonyhádvarasd
- Bölcske
- Cikó
- Csibrák
- Csikóstőttős
- Dalmand
- Decs
- Diósberény
- Döbrököz
- Dunaszentgyörgy
- Dúzs
- Értény
- Fadd
- Fácánkert
- Felsőnána
- Felsőnyék
- Fürged
- Gerjen
- Grábóc
- Györe
- Györköny
- Gyulaj
- Harc
- Hőgyész
- Iregszemcse
- Izmény
- Jágónak
- Kajdacs
- Kakasd
- Kalaznó
- Kapospula
- Kaposszekcső
- Keszőhidegkút
- Kéty
- Kisdorog
- Kismányok
- Kisszékely
- Kistormás
- Kisvejke
- Kocsola
- Koppányszántó
- Kölesd
- Kurd
- Lápafő
- Lengyel
- Madocsa
- Magyarkeszi
- Medina
- Miszla
- Mórágy
- Mőcsény
- Mucsfa
- Mucsi
- Murga
- Nagydorog
- Nagykónyi
- Nagyszékely
- Nagyszokoly
- Nagyvejke
- Nak
- Németkér
- Ozora
- Őcsény
- Pálfa
- Pári
- Pincehely
- Pörböly
- Pusztahencse
- Regöly
- Sárpilis
- Sárszentlőrinc
- Sióagárd
- Szakadát
- Szakály
- Szakcs
- Szálka
- Szárazd
- Szedres
- Tengelic
- Tevel
- Tolnanémedi
- Udvari
- Újireg
- Varsád
- Váralja
- Várdomb
- Várong
- Závod
- Zomba

municipalities are large villages.

== Gallery ==
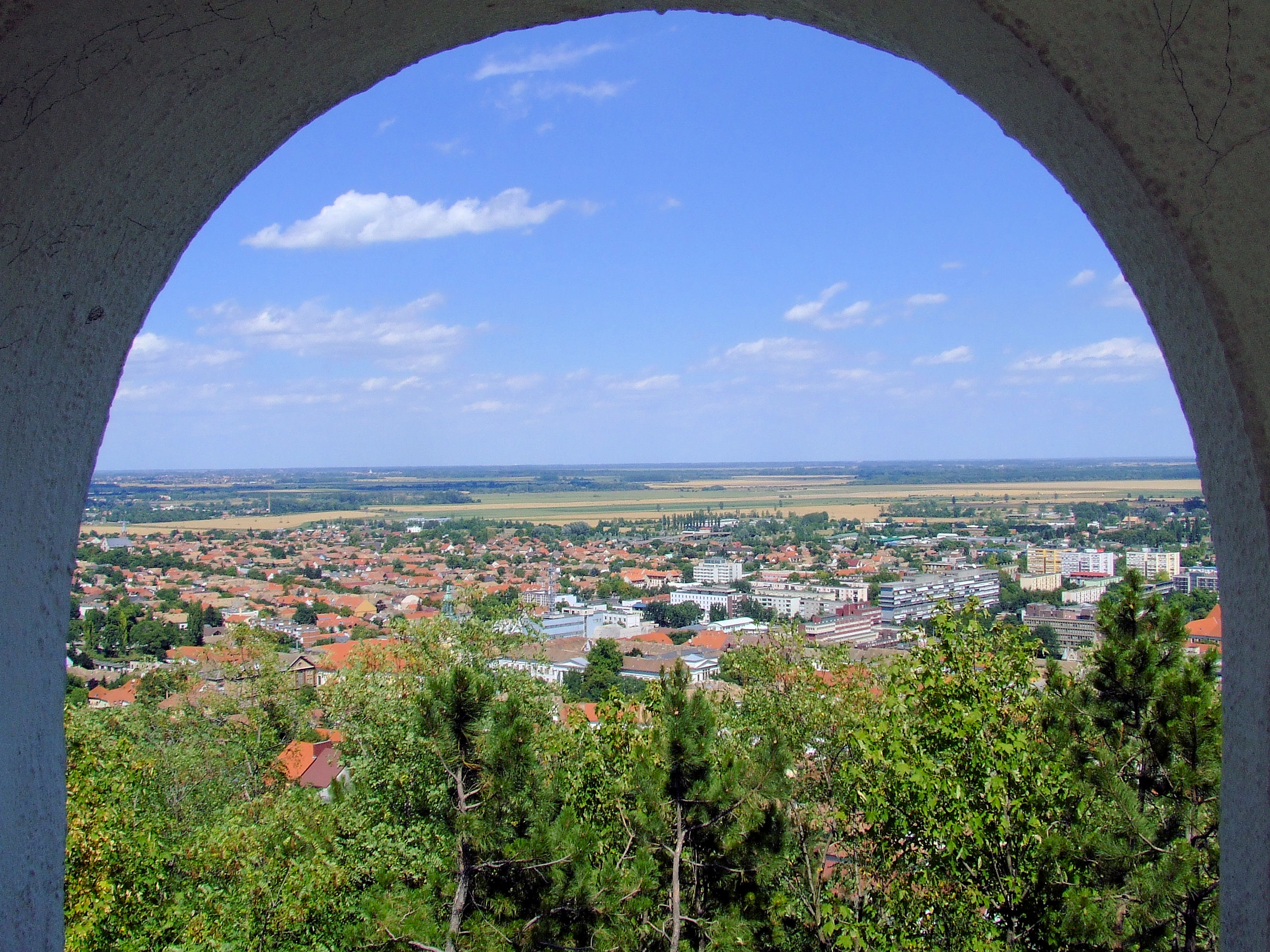
Szekszárd, the seat of the county

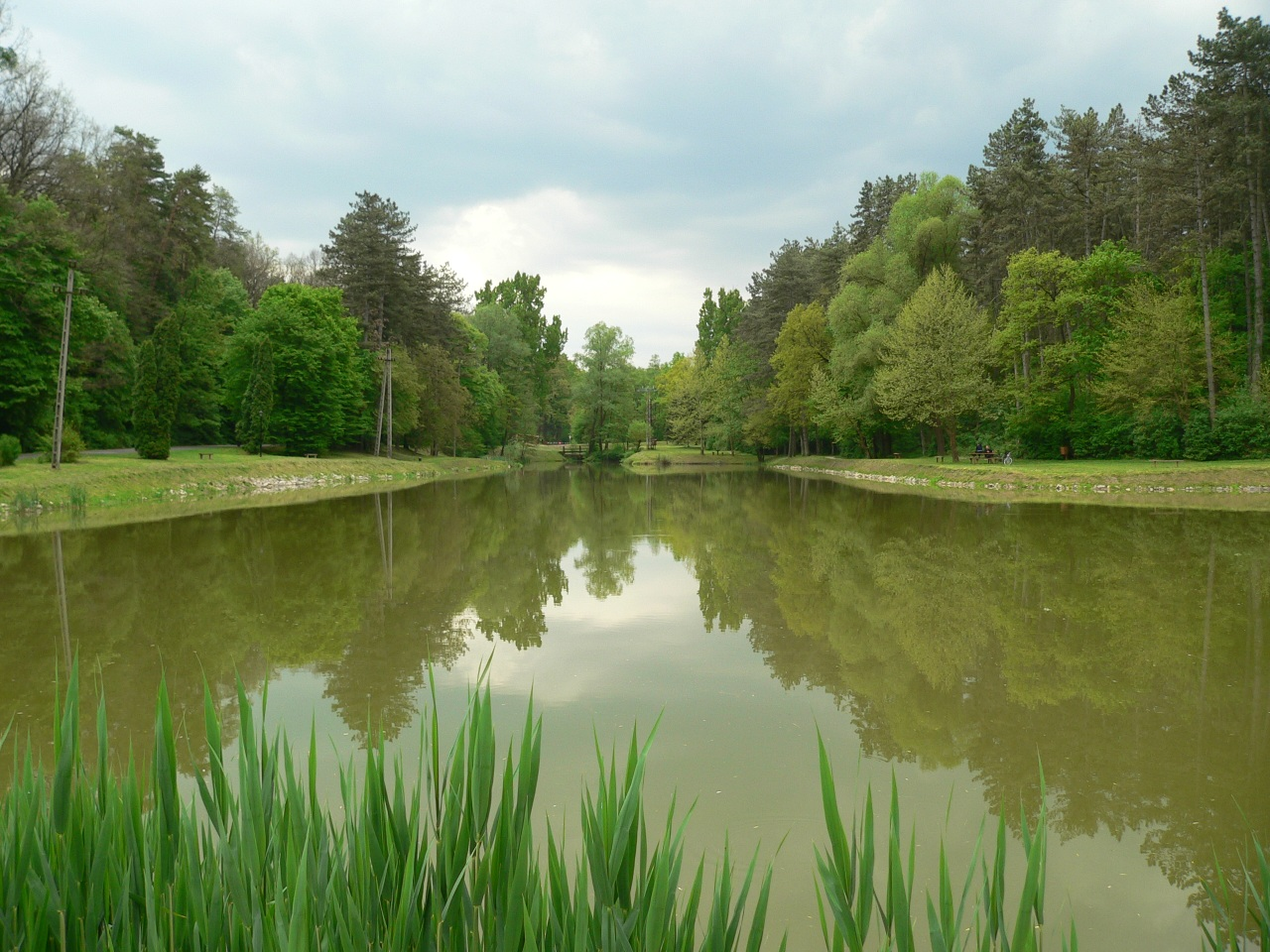
Lake in Tamási

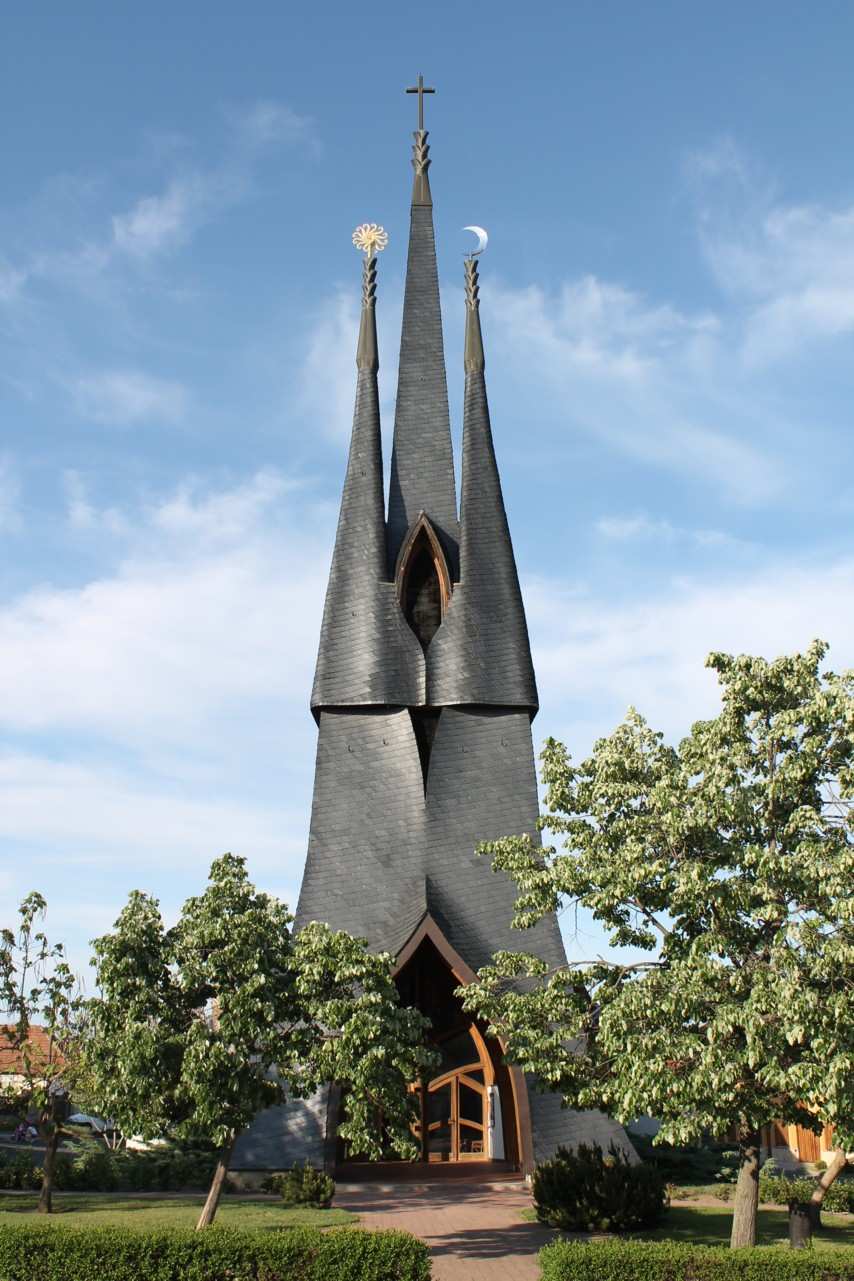
Holy Spirit Church in Paks

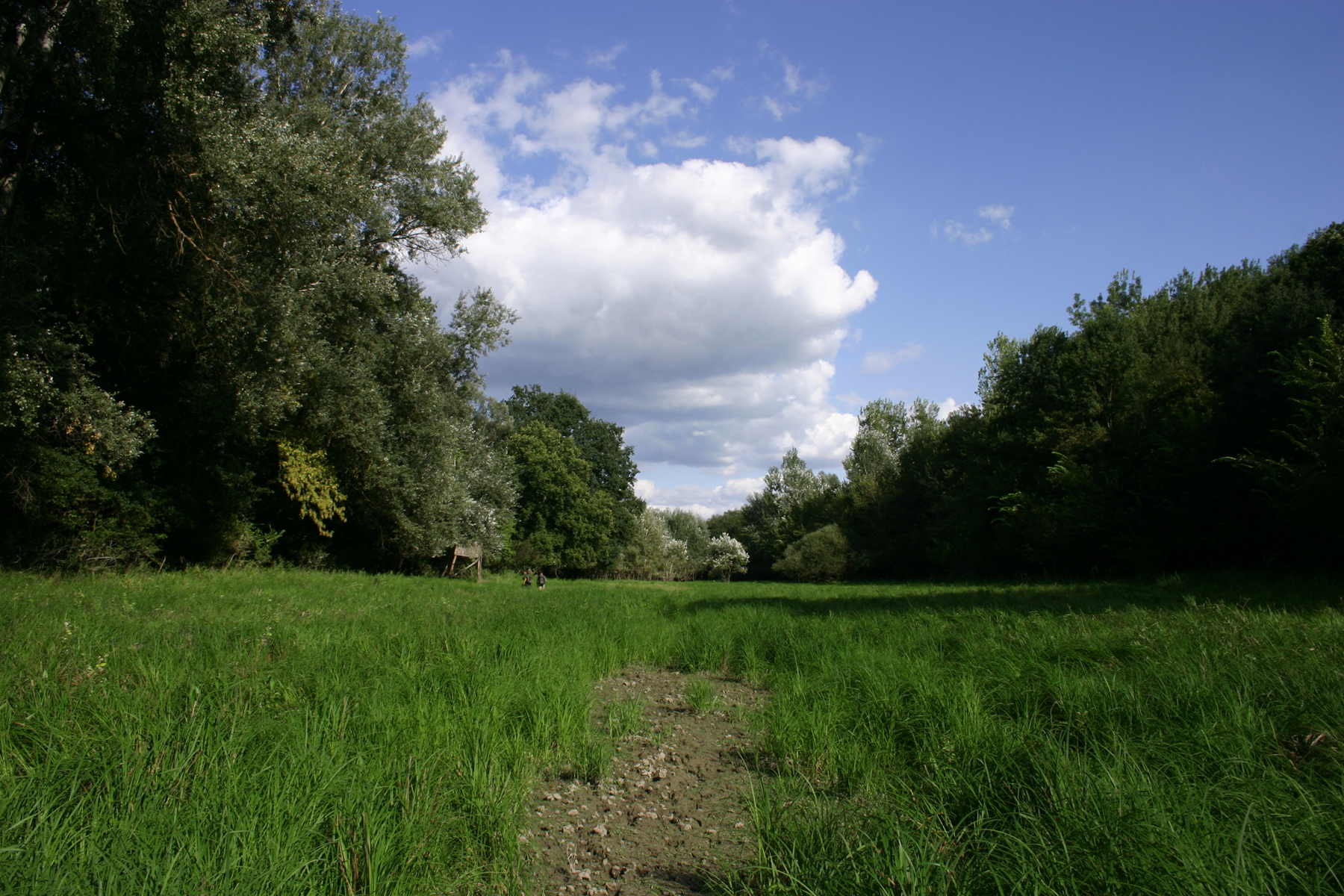
Landscape in Gemenc Forest

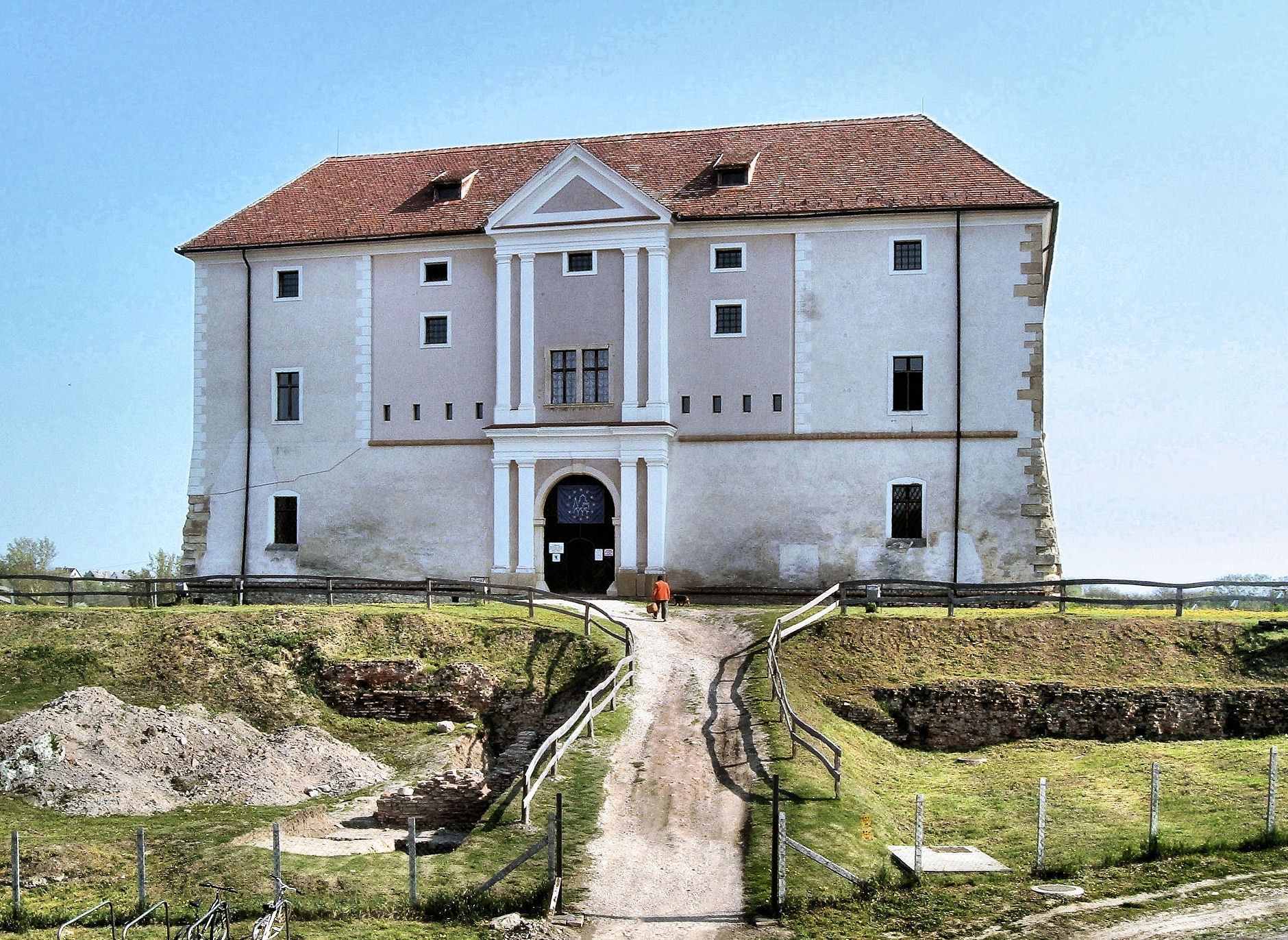
Pipo de Ozora Castle in Ozora

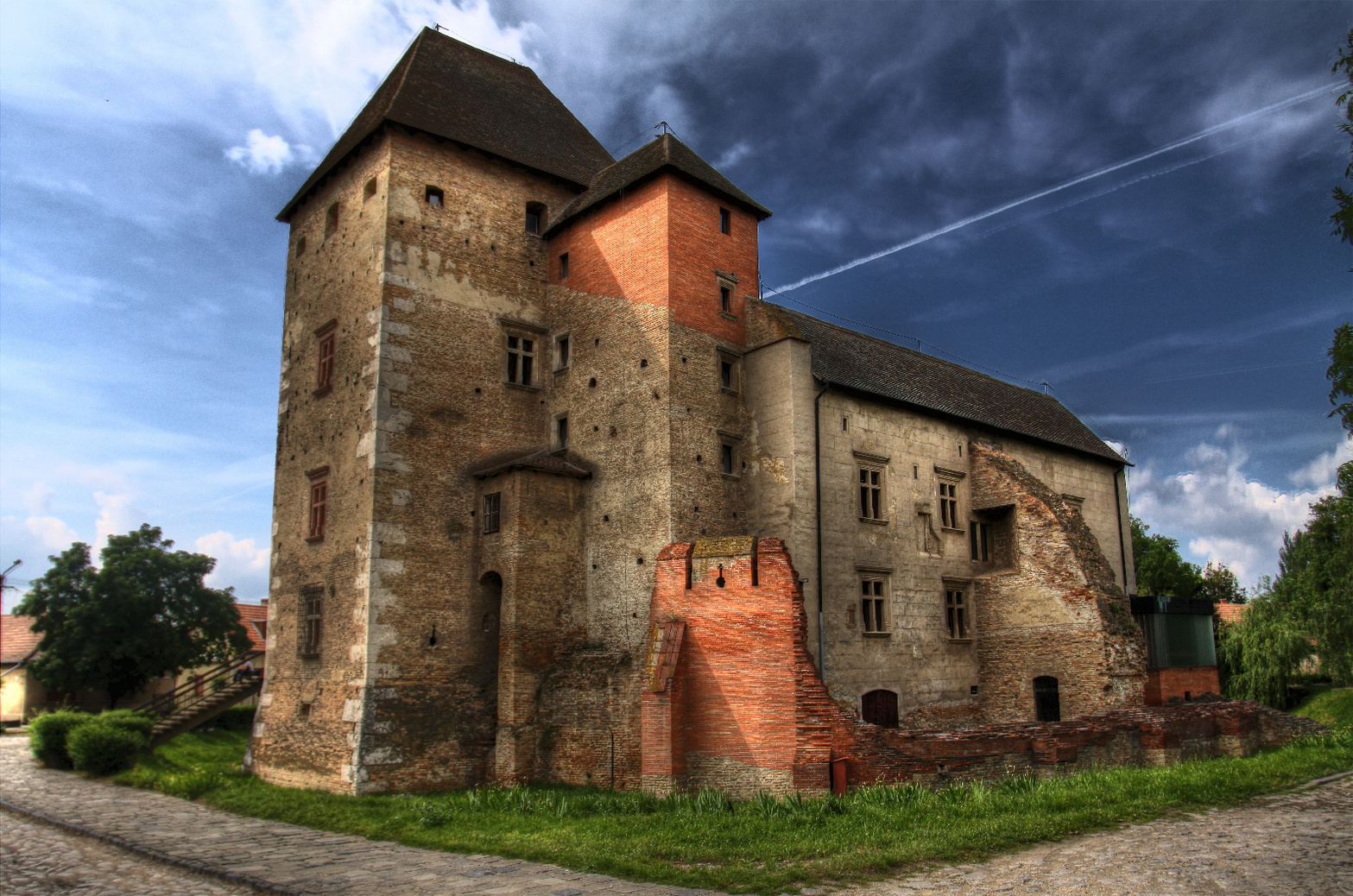
Simontornya Castle

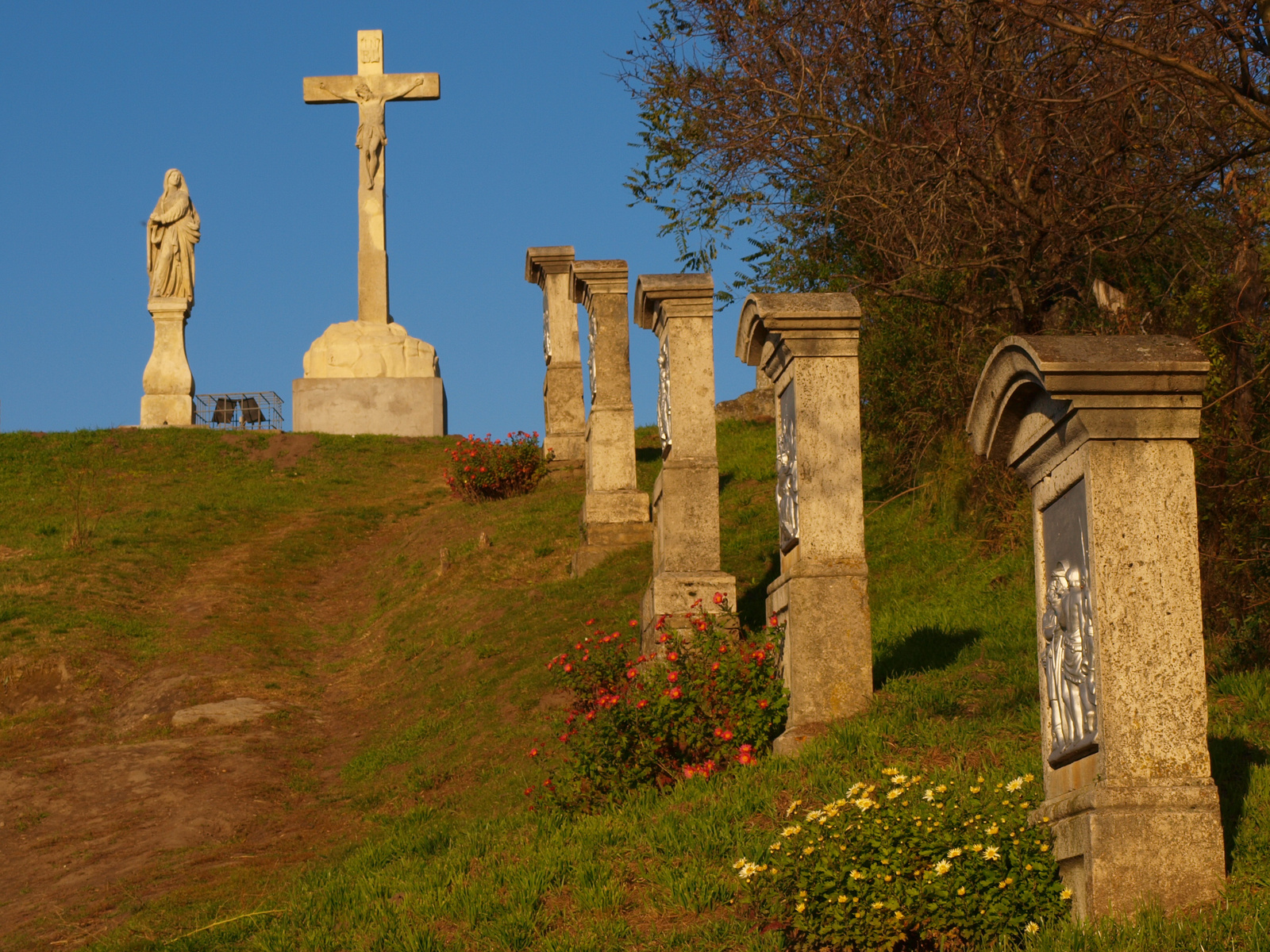
Calvary in Dunaföldvár

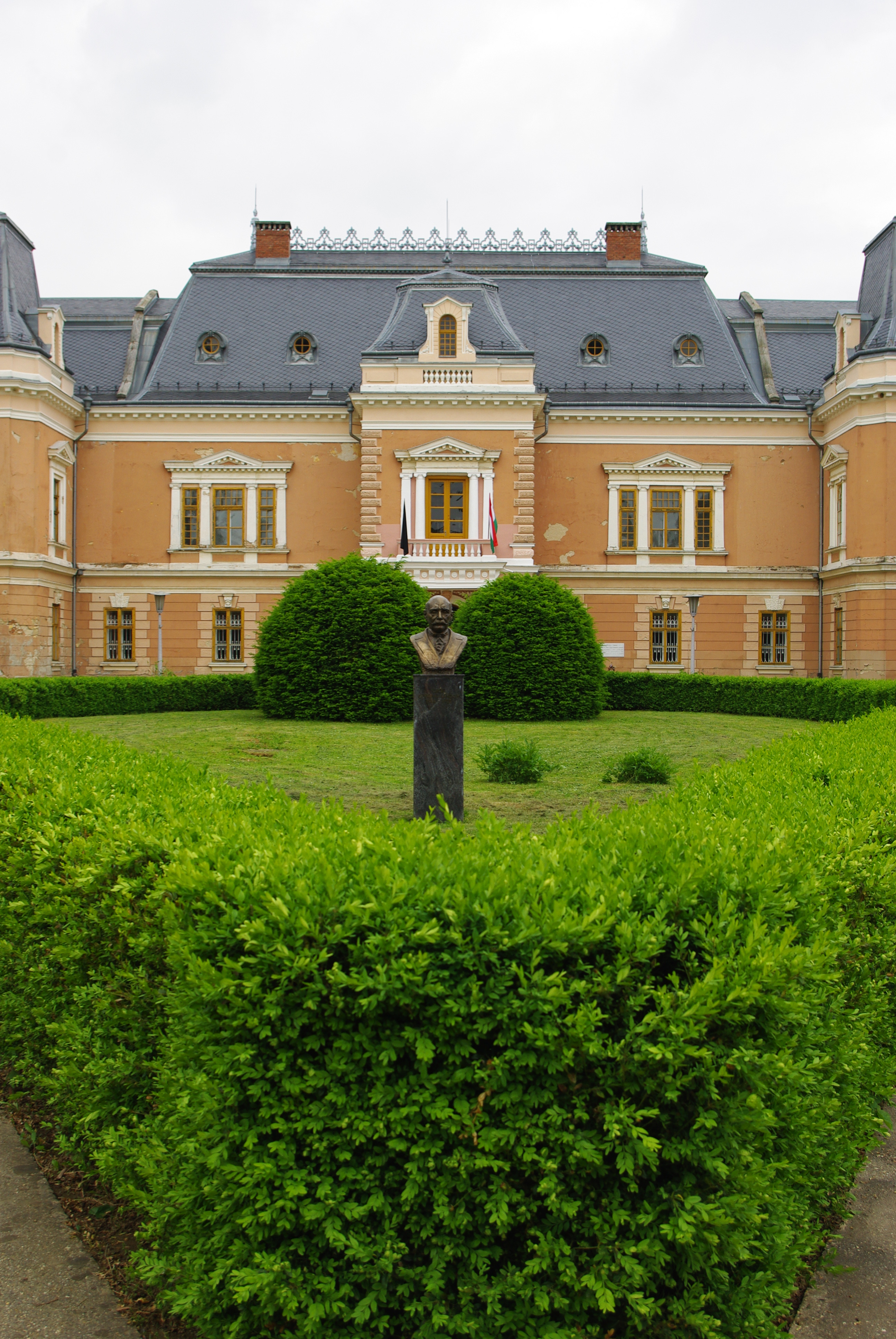
Apponyi Mansion in Lengyel
