= Pusztahencse =

- Location of Tolna county in Hungary

- Location of Pusztahencse
- Coordinates: 46.59233°N 18.71487°E
- Country: Hungary
- County: Tolna

Area
  - Total: 31.71 km^{2} (12.24 sq mi)

Population (2004)
  - Total: 1,069
  - Density: 33.71/km^{2} (87.3/sq mi)
- Time zone: UTC+1 (CET)
  - Summer (DST): UTC+2 (CEST)
- Postal code: 7038
- Area code: 75

Pusztahencse is a village in Tolna County, Hungary.
