= Szakadát =

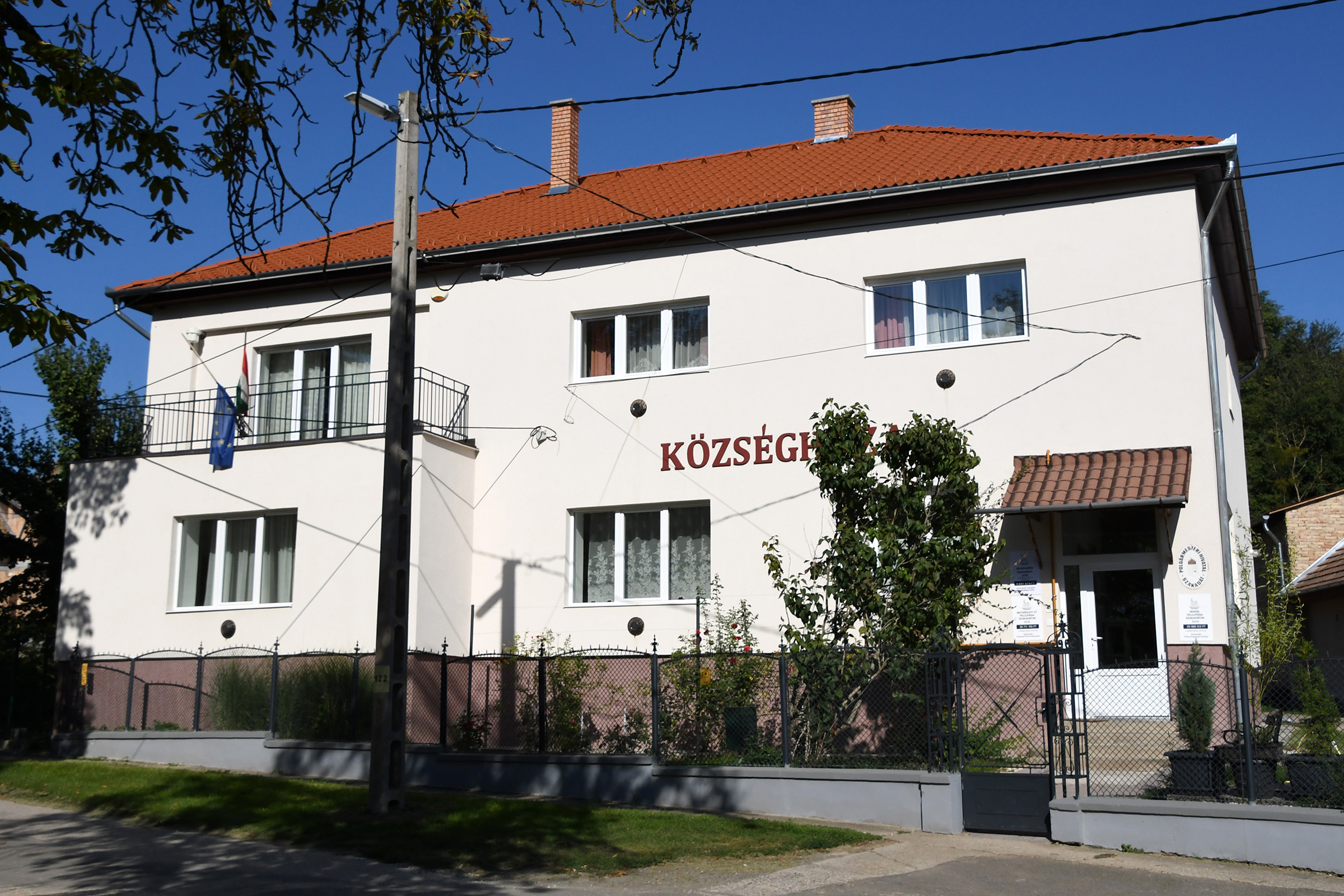
- Village hall

- Location of Tolna county in Hungary

- Location of Szakadát, Hungary
- Coordinates: 46.538°N 18.471°E
- Country: Hungary
- County: Tolna

Area
  - Total: 10.70 km^{2} (4.13 sq mi)

Population (2013)
  - Total: 227
  - Density: 23.55/km^{2} (61.0/sq mi)
- Time zone: UTC+1 (CET)
  - Summer (DST): UTC+2 (CEST)
- Postal code: 7071
- Area code: 74

Szakadát is a village in Tolna County, Hungary.
