= Udvari =

- Location of Tolna county in Hungary

- Location of Udvari
- Coordinates: 46.59382°N 18.51155°E
- Country: Hungary
- County: Tolna

Area
  - Total: 27.65 km^{2} (10.68 sq mi)

Population (2004)
  - Total: 489
  - Density: 17.68/km^{2} (45.8/sq mi)
- Time zone: UTC+1 (CET)
  - Summer (DST): UTC+2 (CEST)
- Postal code: 7066
- Area code: 74

Udvari is a village in Tolna County, Hungary.
