= Magyarkeszi =

- Location of Tolna county in Hungary

- Location of Magyarkeszi
- Coordinates: 46.74831°N 18.23565°E
- Country: Hungary
- County: Tolna

Area
  - Total: 38.16 km^{2} (14.73 sq mi)

Population (2004)
  - Total: 1,342
  - Density: 35.16/km^{2} (91.1/sq mi)
- Time zone: UTC+1 (CET)
  - Summer (DST): UTC+2 (CEST)
- Postal code: 7098
- Area code: 74

Magyarkeszi is a village in Tolna County, Hungary.
