= Bikács =

- Location of Tolna county in Hungary

- Location of Bikács
- Coordinates: 46.676°N 18.668°E
- Country: Hungary
- County: Tolna

Area
  - Total: 34.67 km^{2} (13.39 sq mi)

Population (2025)
  - Total: 392
  - Density: 14.1/km^{2} (37/sq mi)
- Time zone: UTC+1 (CET)
  - Summer (DST): UTC+2 (CEST)
- Postal code: 7043
- Area code: 75

Bikács is a village in Tolna (county) in Hungary. Its population is 392 inhabitants as of 2025.
