= Keszőhidegkút =

- Village
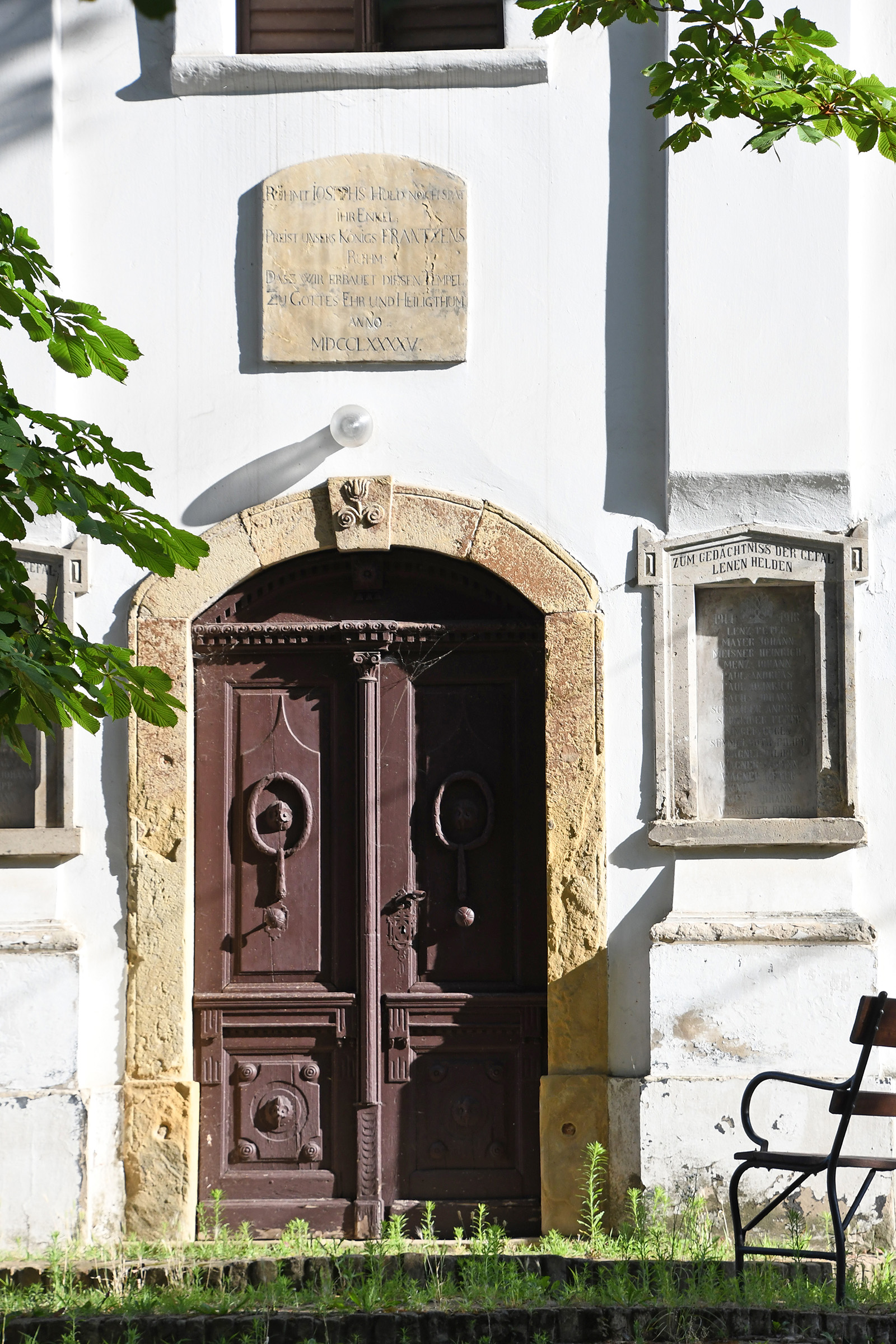
- Entrance to the Lutheran Church

- Coat of arms

- Location of Tolna county in Hungary

- Location within Hungary
- Coordinates: 46°36′40″N 18°25′14″E
- Country: Hungary
- County: Tolna

Area
  - Total: 10.3 km^{2} (4.0 sq mi)

Population (2011)
  - Total: 204
  - Density: 19.8/km^{2} (51.3/sq mi)
- Time zone: UTC+1 (CET)
  - Summer (DST): UTC+2 (CEST)
- Postal code: 7062
- Area code: 74

Keszőhidegkút is a village in Tolna county, Hungary.
