= Tolnanémedi =

- Coat of arms

- Location of Tolnanémedi in Hungary
- Coordinates: 46°42′55″N 18°28′33″E
- Country: Hungary
- Region: Southern Transdanubia
- County: Tolna

Area
  - Total: 21.10 km^{2} (8.15 sq mi)

Population (2011)
  - Total: 1,079
  - Density: 51.14/km^{2} (132.4/sq mi)
- Time zone: UTC+1 (CET)
  - Summer (DST): UTC+2 (CEST)
- Postal code: 7083
- Area code: +36 74
- Website: http://www.tolnanemedi.hu/

Tolnanémedi is a village in Tolna county, Hungary.
