= Györköny =

Györköny Jerking
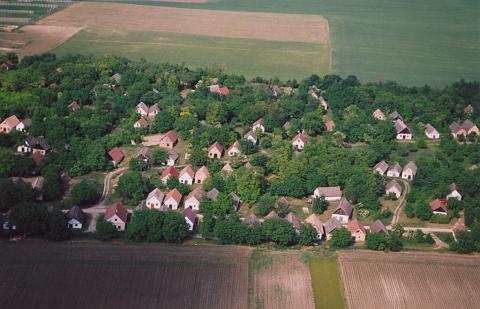
- Aerial view

- Coat of arms

- Location within Hungary
- Coordinates: 46°38′10″N 18°41′49″E
- Country: Hungary
- County: Tolna

Area
  - Total: 31.6 km^{2} (12.2 sq mi)

Population (2011)
  - Total: 938
  - Density: 29.7/km^{2} (76.9/sq mi)
- Time zone: UTC+1 (CET)
  - Summer (DST): UTC+2 (CEST)
- Postal code: 7045
- Area code: 75

Györköny (German: Jerking) is a village in Tolna county, Hungary.
