= Kistormás =

- Location of Tolna county in Hungary

- Location within Hungary
- Coordinates: 46°30′01″N 18°33′59″E
- Country: Hungary
- County: Tolna

Area
  - Total: 11.3 km^{2} (4.4 sq mi)

Population (2011)
  - Total: 324
  - Density: 28.7/km^{2} (74.3/sq mi)
- Time zone: UTC+1 (CET)
  - Summer (DST): UTC+2 (CEST)
- Postal code: 7068
- Area code: 74

Kistormás is a village in Tolna county, Hungary.
