= Kisszékely =

- Location of Tolna county in Hungary

- Location within Hungary
- Coordinates: 46°40′46″N 18°32′20″E
- Country: Hungary
- County: Tolna

Government
  - Mayor: Pajor Ágnes (Ind.)

Area
  - Total: 28.3 km^{2} (10.9 sq mi)

Population (2022)
  - Total: 266
  - Density: 9.40/km^{2} (24.3/sq mi)
- Time zone: UTC+1 (CET)
  - Summer (DST): UTC+2 (CEST)
- Postal code: 7082
- Area code: 74

Kisszékely is a village in Tolna county, Hungary.
