= Fürged =

- Location of Tolna county in Hungary

- Location of Fürged
- Coordinates: 46°43′42″N 18°18′13″E
- Country: Hungary
- County: Tolna

Area
  - Total: 26.7 km^{2} (10.3 sq mi)

Population (2025)
  - Total: 622
  - Density: 23.3/km^{2} (60.3/sq mi)
- Time zone: UTC+1 (CET)
  - Summer (DST): UTC+2 (CEST)
- Postal code: 7087
- Area code: 74

Fürged is a village in Tolna county, Hungary.
