= Dalmand =

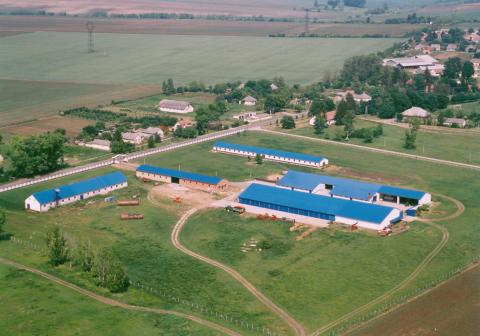
- Aerial photograph of Dalmand

- Location of Tolna county in Hungary

- Location of Dalmand
- Coordinates: 46.49204°N 18.18987°E
- Country: Hungary
- County: Tolna

Area
  - Total: 48.77 km^{2} (18.83 sq mi)

Population (2004)
  - Total: 1,460
  - Density: 29.93/km^{2} (77.5/sq mi)
- Time zone: UTC+1 (CET)
  - Summer (DST): UTC+2 (CEST)
- Postal code: 7211
- Area code: 74

Dalmand is a village in Tolna County, Hungary.
