= Nak, Hungary =

Nak
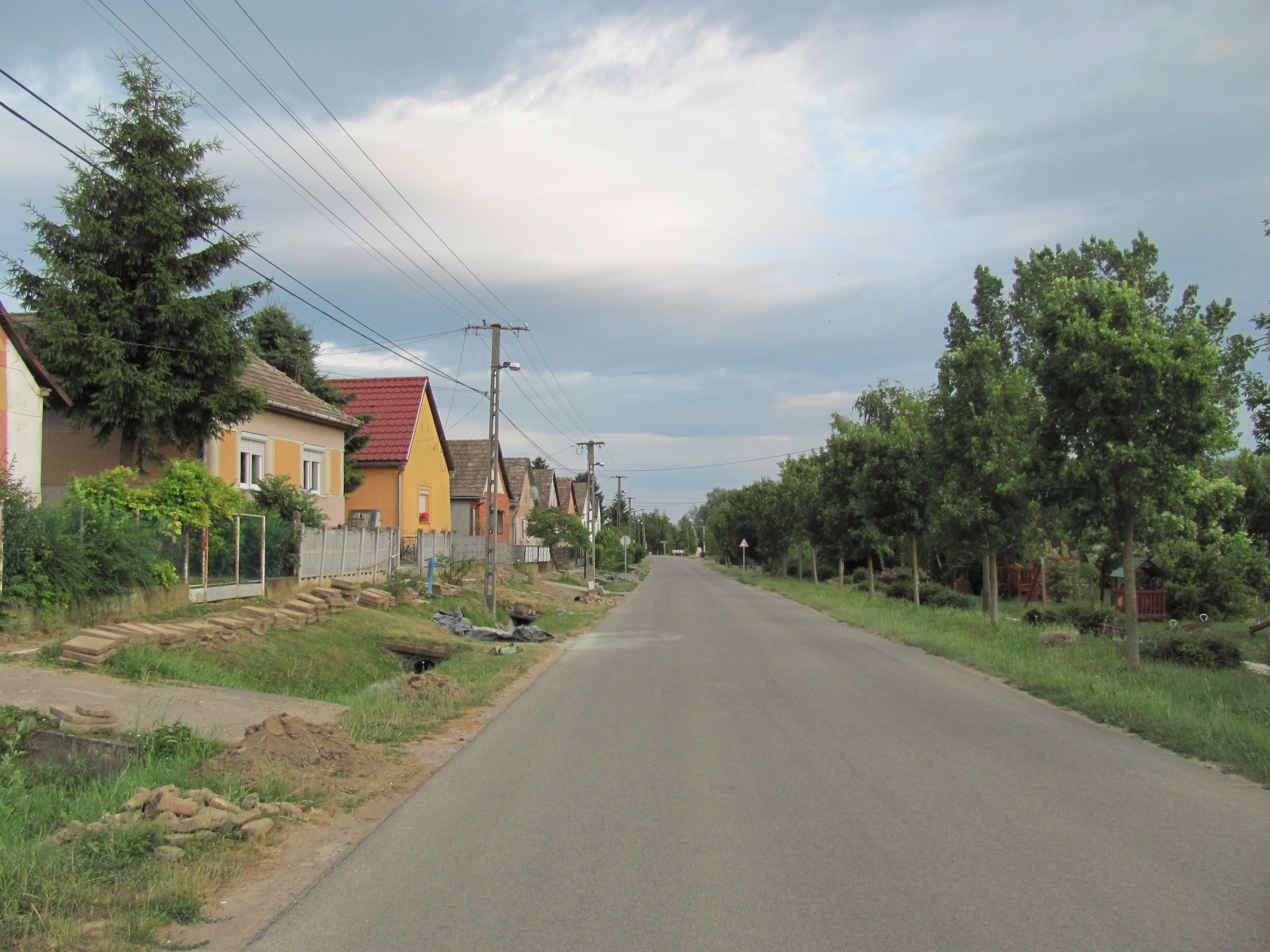
- Nak main street

- Location of Tolna county in Hungary

- Location of Nak, Hungary
- Coordinates: 46.48109°N 18.05813°E
- Country: Hungary
- County: Tolna

Area
  - Total: 27.78 km^{2} (10.73 sq mi)

Population (2004)
  - Total: 672
  - Density: 24.19/km^{2} (62.7/sq mi)
- Time zone: UTC+1 (CET)
  - Summer (DST): UTC+2 (CEST)
- Postal code: 7215
- Area code: 74

Nak is a village in Tolna County, Hungary.
