= Kocsola =

- Location of Tolna county in Hungary

- Location of Kocsola
- Coordinates: 46.52773°N 18.18209°E
- Country: Hungary
- County: Tolna

Area
  - Total: 33.34 km^{2} (12.87 sq mi)

Population (2004)
  - Total: 1,416
  - Density: 42.47/km^{2} (110.0/sq mi)
- Time zone: UTC+1 (CET)
  - Summer (DST): UTC+2 (CEST)
- Postal code: 7212
- Area code: 74

Kocsola is a village in Tolna County, Hungary.
