= Jágónak =

- Village
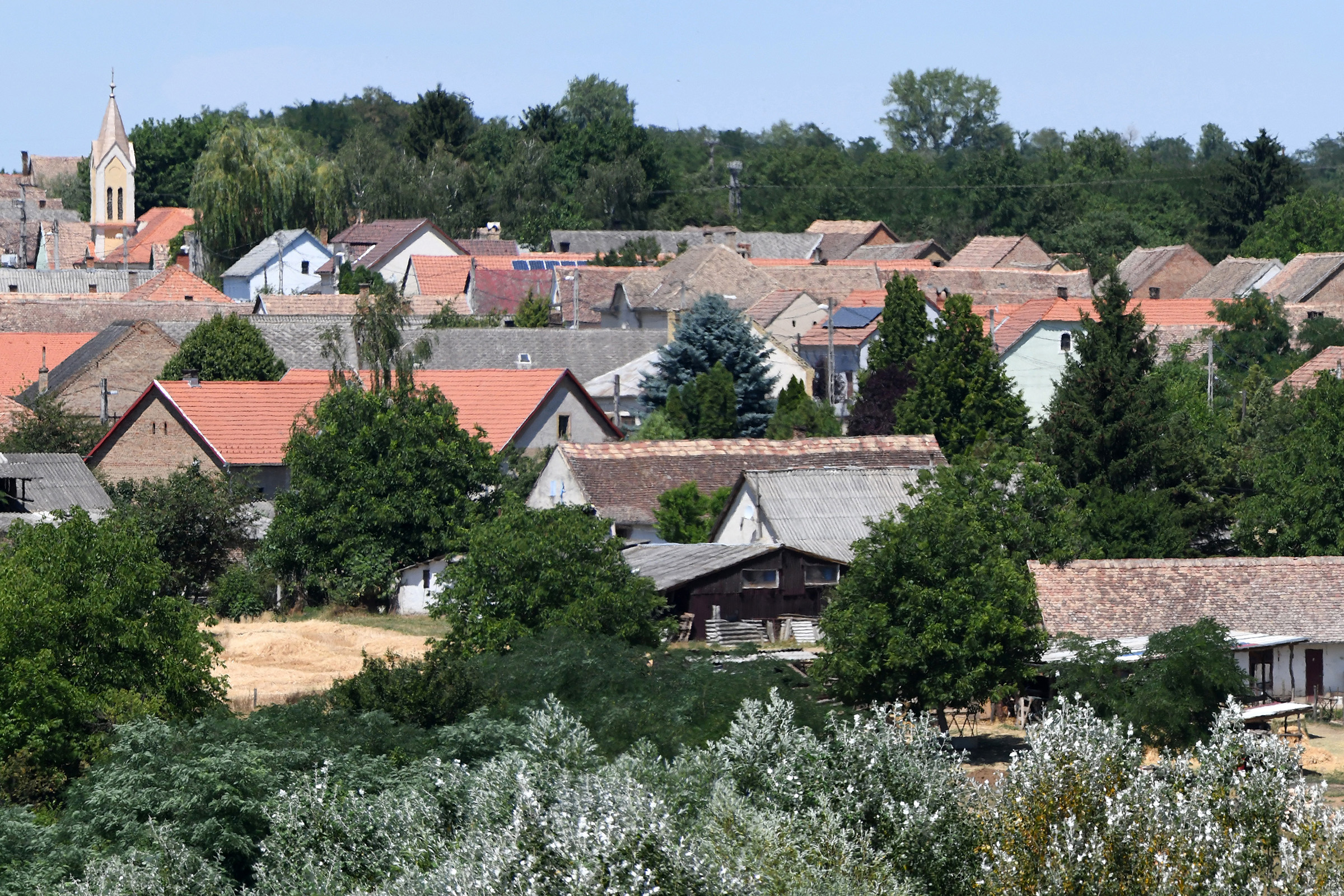
- View of the village from the southeast

- Coat of arms

- Location of Tolna county in Hungary

- Location within Hungary
- Coordinates: 46°18′49″N 18°05′33″E
- Country: Hungary
- County: Tolna

Area
  - Total: 15.4 km^{2} (5.9 sq mi)

Population (2011)
  - Total: 239
  - Density: 15.5/km^{2} (40.2/sq mi)
- Time zone: UTC+1 (CET)
  - Summer (DST): UTC+2 (CEST)
- Postal code: 7357
- Area code: 74

Jágónak is a village in Tolna county, Hungary.

== History ==
In the second half of the 18th century, Swabians arrived in the village. Following the Second World War, the village's German population was deported, and replaced with Hungarians from Slovakia. This resettlment was coordinated by the Czechoslovak–Hungarian population exchange program.

In 1975, the village was transferred from Baranya County to Tolna County.

== Demographics ==
As of 2011, the village was 84.9% Hungarian, 3.8% German, and 1.3% Gypsy. The villagers are 62.6% Roman Catholic, and 3.4% Reformed.
