= Lápafő =

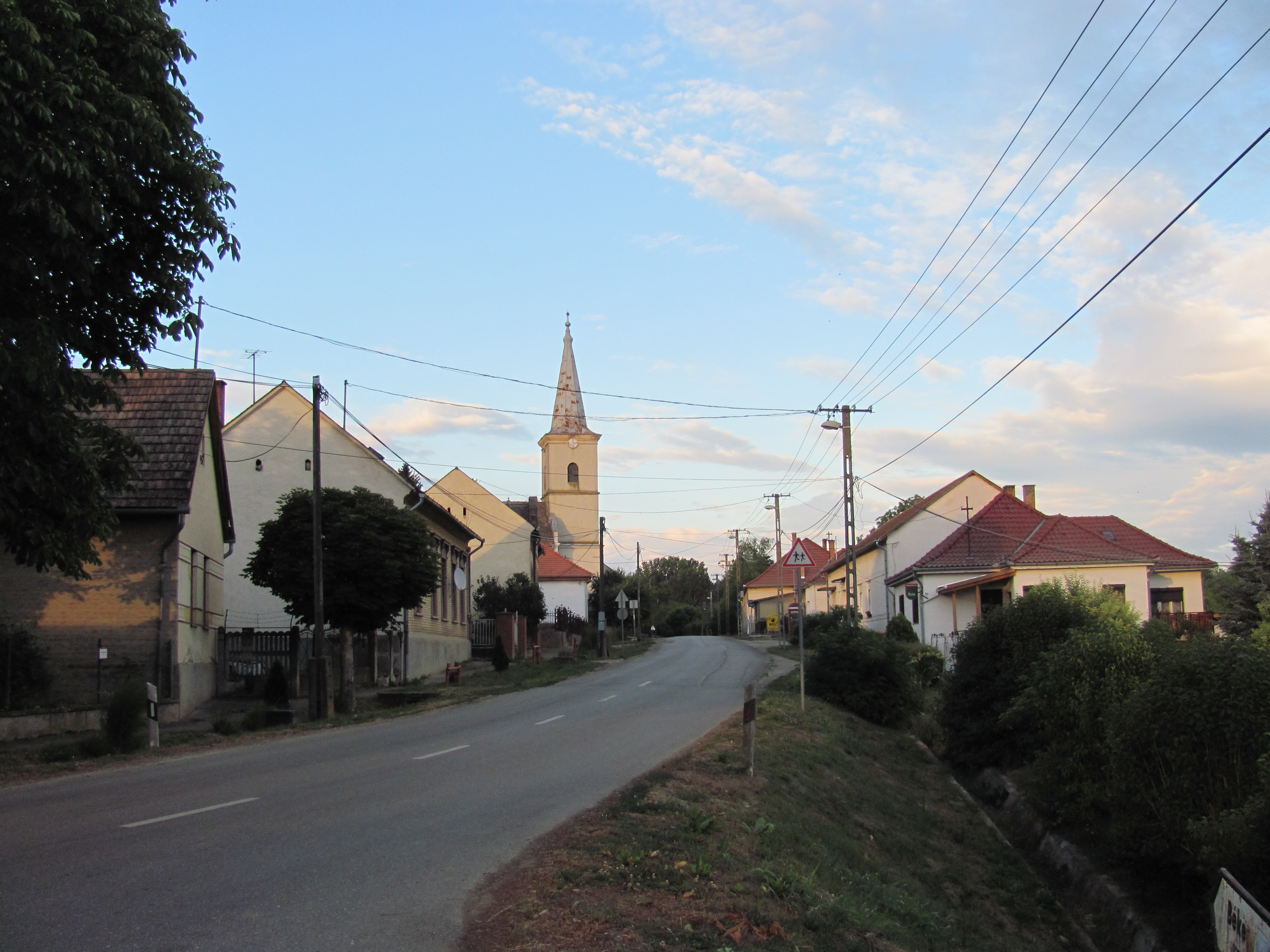
- Lápafő

- Location of Tolna county in Hungary

- Location within Hungary
- Coordinates: 46°30′51″N 18°03′26″E
- Country: Hungary
- County: Tolna

Area
  - Total: 9.3 km^{2} (3.6 sq mi)

Population (2011)
  - Total: 152
  - Density: 16/km^{2} (42/sq mi)
- Time zone: UTC+1 (CET)
  - Summer (DST): UTC+2 (CEST)
- Postal code: 7214
- Area code: 74

Lápafő is a village in Tolna county, Hungary.
