= Várong =

- Coat of arms

- Location of Várong in Hungary
- Coordinates: 46°31′31″N 18°02′47″E
- Country: Hungary
- Region: Southern Transdanubia
- County: Tolna

Area
  - Total: 6.6 km^{2} (2.5 sq mi)

Population (2011)
  - Total: 148
  - Density: 22/km^{2} (58/sq mi)
- Time zone: UTC+1 (CET)
  - Summer (DST): UTC+2 (CEST)
- Postal code: 7214
- Area code: +36 74
- Website: www.varong.hu

Várong is a village in Tolna County, Hungary. A few Vikings from Russia were settled here.
