= Attala, Hungary =

Attala
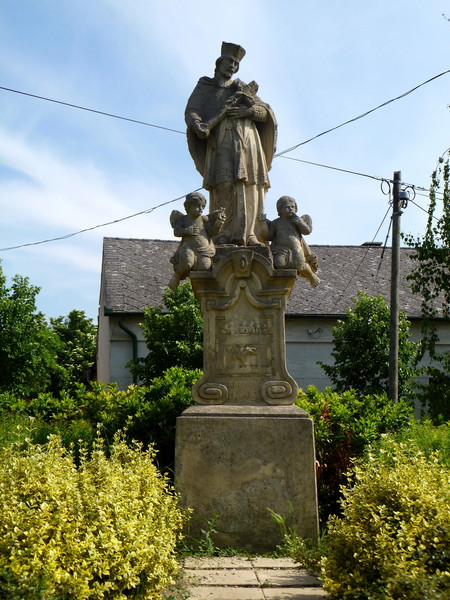
- Monument of St. John of Nepomuk

- Coat of arms

- Location of Tolna county in Hungary

- Location of Attala, Hungary
- Coordinates: 46.37757°N 18.06721°E
- Country: Hungary
- County: Tolna

Area
  - Total: 20.64 km^{2} (7.97 sq mi)

Population (2015)
  - Total: 820
  - Density: 40/km^{2} (100/sq mi)
- Time zone: UTC+1 (CET)
  - Summer (DST): UTC+2 (CEST)
- Postal code: 7252
- Area code: 74
- Website: http://www.attala.hu/

Attala is a village in Tolna County, Hungary.

== Etymology ==
According to the local legends the name comes from the name of the mistress of Sülledvár. Her name could be Atala. She committed blasphemy as the legend says and her castle sank into the ground. There was indeed a castle during the Roman times.

The accepted theory states that the name could came from the person name Attila.

== History ==
According to László Szita the settlement was completely Hungarian in the 18th century.
