= Szakcs =

- Location of Tolna county in Hungary

- Location of Szakcs
- Coordinates: 46.54187°N 18.11042°E
- Country: Hungary
- County: Tolna

Area
  - Total: 55.79 km^{2} (21.54 sq mi)

Population (2004)
  - Total: 1,003
  - Density: 17.97/km^{2} (46.5/sq mi)
- Time zone: UTC+1 (CET)
  - Summer (DST): UTC+2 (CEST)
- Postal code: 7213
- Area code: 74

Szakcs is a village in Tolna County, Hungary.
