= Újireg =

- Coat of arms

- Location of Újireg in Hungary
- Coordinates: 46°39′25″N 18°10′40″E
- Country: Hungary
- Region: Southern Transdanubia
- County: Tolna

Area
  - Total: 10.9 km^{2} (4.2 sq mi)

Population (2011)
  - Total: 286
  - Density: 26.2/km^{2} (68.0/sq mi)
- Time zone: UTC+1 (CET)
  - Summer (DST): UTC+2 (CEST)
- Postal code: 7095
- Area code: +36 74
- Website: http://ujireg.hu

Újireg is a village in Tolna county, Hungary.
