= Harc =

- Location of Tolna county in Hungary

- Location of Harc
- Coordinates: 46.40184°N 18.62156°E
- Country: Hungary
- County: Tolna

Area
  - Total: 15.86 km^{2} (6.12 sq mi)

Population (2004)
  - Total: 915
  - Density: 57.69/km^{2} (149.4/sq mi)
- Time zone: UTC+1 (CET)
  - Summer (DST): UTC+2 (CEST)
- Postal code: 7172
- Area code: 74

Harc is a village in Tolna County, Hungary.
