= Csikóstőttős =

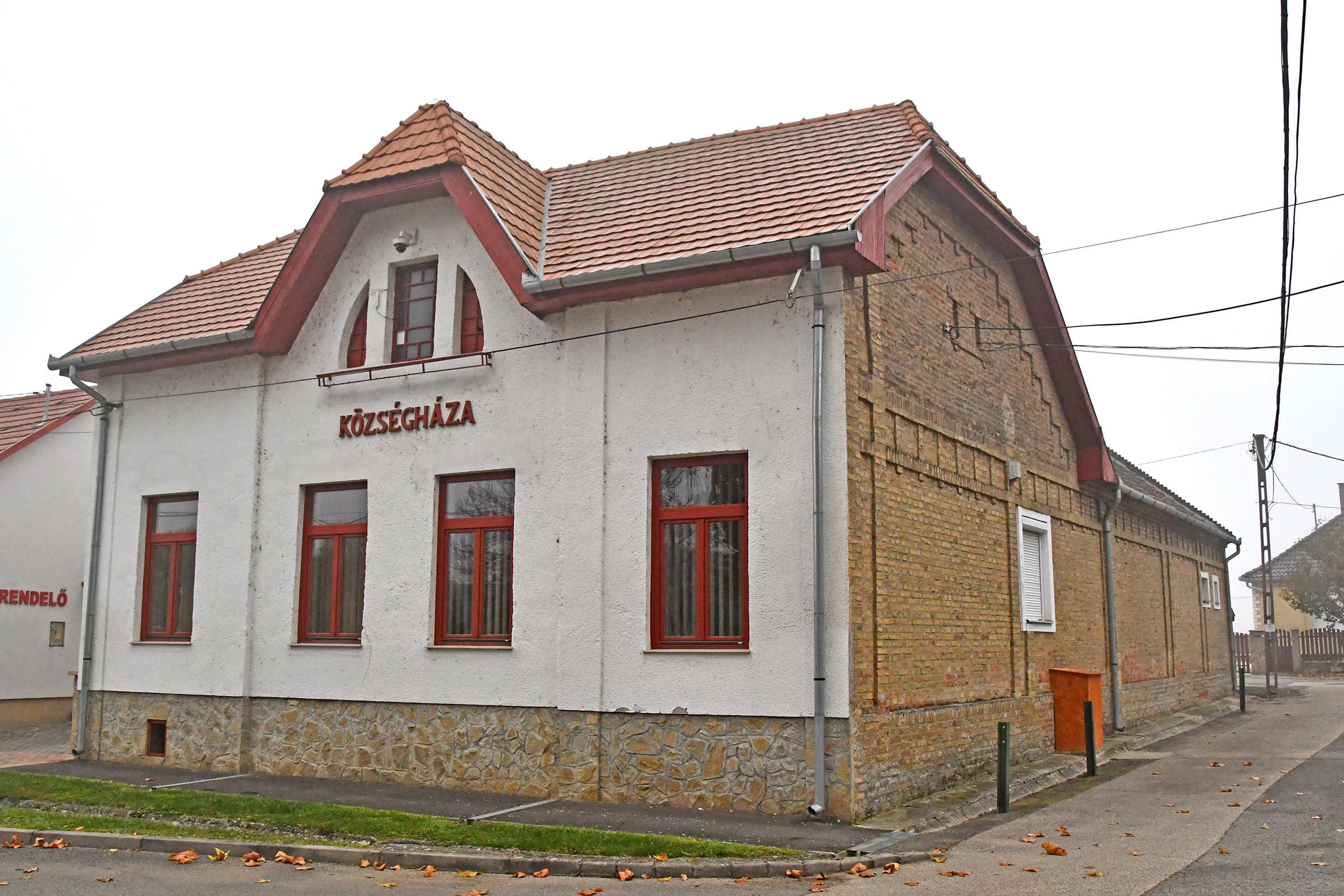
- Village hall

- Coat of arms

- Location of Csikóstőttős in Hungary
- Coordinates: 46.339769°N 18.154711°E
- Country: Hungary
- Region: Southern Transdanubia
- County: Tolna
- Subregion: Dombovári
- Rank: Village

Area
  - Total: 20.44 km^{2} (7.89 sq mi)
- Time zone: UTC+1 (CET)
  - Summer (DST): UTC+2 (CEST)
- Postal code: 7341
- Area code: +36 74
- Website: https://csikostottos.hu/

Csikóstőttős is a village in Tolna County, Hungary.
