= Döbrököz =

Place in Southern Transdanubia, Hungary

- Coat of arms

- Location of Döbrököz in Hungary
- Coordinates: 46°25′12.40″N 18°15′16.78″E
- Country: Hungary
- Region: Southern Transdanubia
- County: Tolna
- Subregion: Dombóvári
- Rank: Village

Area
  - Total: 43.13 km^{2} (16.65 sq mi)

Population (1 January 2008)
  - Total: 2,064
  - Density: 47.86/km^{2} (123.9/sq mi)
- Time zone: UTC+1 (CET)
  - Summer (DST): UTC+2 (CEST)
- Postal code: 7228
- Area code: +36 74
- KSH code: 02565
- Website: www.dobrokoz.hu

Döbrököz is a village in Tolna County, Hungary.
