= Kurd, Hungary =

Kurd
- Coat of arms

- Location of Tolna county in Hungary

- Location of Kurd, Hungary
- Coordinates: 46.44471°N 18.31631°E
- Country: Hungary
- County: Tolna

Area
  - Total: 31.19 km^{2} (12.04 sq mi)

Population (2010)
  - Total: 1,223
  - Density: 39.21/km^{2} (101.6/sq mi)
- Time zone: UTC+1 (CET)
  - Summer (DST): UTC+2 (CEST)
- Postal code: 7226
- Area code: 74
- Website: www.kurd.hu

Kurd is a village in Tolna County, Hungary.

Kurdish tribal chiefs were present in Hungary during the Ottoman–Hungarian Wars and fought the Hungarian army from 1440 to 1442. The village of Kurd can be bound to the legendary Kurdish military chief Kurd Pasha, whose grave is located near the city. In 1729, migrants from central Hungary of Hungarian, Slavic, Serbian and Slovak origin settled in the village. Until World War II Germans from Rheinland and Romas constituted the majority of the village. Whether the local population is of Kurdish descent is doubtful, but the mayor István Cser and locals expressed their awareness of Kurdish affairs during an interview in 1998.
