= Fácánkert =

- Village
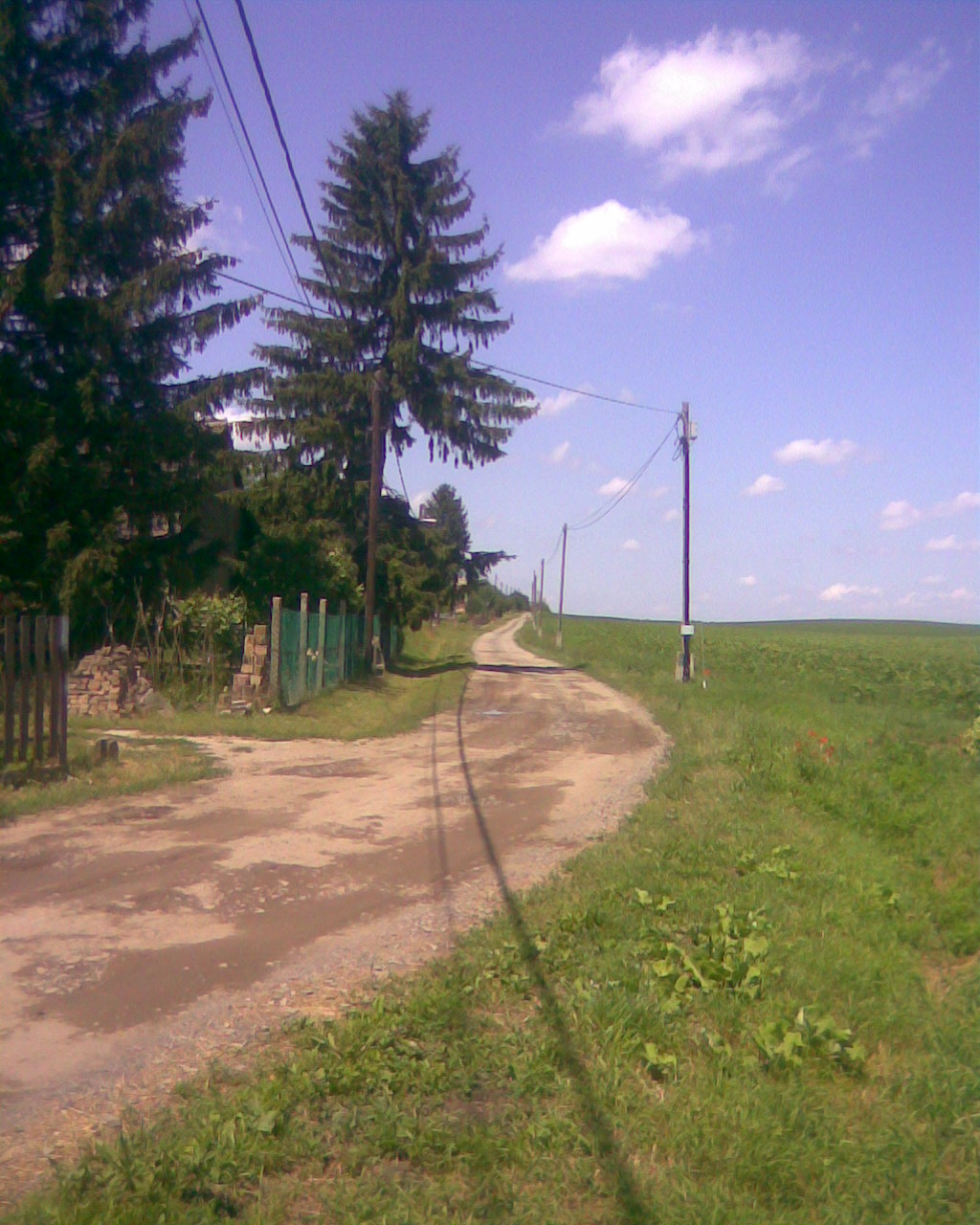

- Coat of arms

- Location of Tolna county in Hungary

- Location of Fácánkert
- Coordinates: 46°26′56″N 18°44′12″E
- Country: Hungary
- County: Tolna

Area
  - Total: 10.7 km^{2} (4.1 sq mi)

Population (2011)
  - Total: 630
  - Density: 59/km^{2} (150/sq mi)
- Time zone: UTC+1 (CET)
  - Summer (DST): UTC+2 (CEST)
- Postal code: 7136
- Area code: 74

Fácánkert is a village in Tolna county, Hungary.

The village of Facankert is located in the Hungarian county of Tolna. It hosts the estate of Count Festetich, which he lived in from 1904 to 1907, until a wealthy merchant family, the Kunffy's, purchased it and began to grow crops there.
