= Csibrák =

- Coat of arms

- Location of Csibrák in Hungary
- Coordinates: 46.4662°N 18.3445°E
- Country: Hungary
- Region: Southern Transdanubia
- County: Tolna
- Subregion: Dombóvári
- Rank: Village

Area
  - Total: 14.62 km^{2} (5.64 sq mi)

Population (1 January 2008)
  - Total: 358
  - Density: 24.5/km^{2} (63.4/sq mi)
- Time zone: UTC+1 (CET)
  - Summer (DST): UTC+2 (CEST)
- Postal code: 7225
- Area code: +36 74
- KSH code: 11998
- Website: www.csibrak.hu

Csibrák is a village in Tolna County, Hungary, once settled by Danube Swabians. Around 1865 - 1880, several Danube Swabian from the Tolna settled in Slavonia, several families from Csibrák went to Slavonia and settled there.
