= Nagyszokoly =

- Location of Tolna county in Hungary

- Location of Nagyszokoly
- Coordinates: 46.72132°N 18.21182°E
- Country: Hungary
- County: Tolna

Area
  - Total: 27.99 km^{2} (10.81 sq mi)

Population (2004)
  - Total: 970
  - Density: 34.65/km^{2} (89.7/sq mi)
- Time zone: UTC+1 (CET)
  - Summer (DST): UTC+2 (CEST)
- Postal code: 7097
- Area code: 74

Nagyszokoly (German: Großsokau) is a village in Tolna County, Hungary.
