= Kapospula =

- Location of Tolna county in Hungary

- Location of Kapospula
- Coordinates: 46.37580°N 18.10277°E
- Country: Hungary
- County: Tolna

Area
  - Total: 19.8 km^{2} (7.6 sq mi)

Population (2004)
  - Total: 998
  - Density: 50.4/km^{2} (131/sq mi)
- Time zone: UTC+1 (CET)
  - Summer (DST): UTC+2 (CEST)
- Postal code: 7251
- Area code: 74

Kapospula is a village in Tolna County, Hungary.
