= List of castles in Hungary =

This list of castles in Hungary article consists mostly of the well-known castles on the territory of today's Hungary.

== List of castles ==
List of castles in Hungary
Settlement	Castle	Picture	County	District
Budapest	Buda Castle		Budapest	District I
Budapest	Citadella		Budapest	District I
Budapest	Medieval city walls of Pest		Budapest	District I
Budapest	Vajdahunyad Castle		Budapest	District VI
Abaújvár	Abaúj Castle		Borsod-Abaúj-Zemplén County	Gönc District
Babócsa	Babócsa Castle		Somogy County	Barcs District
Bácsalmás	Bácsalmás Castle		Bács-Kiskun County	Bácsalmás District
Bakonybél	Bakonyúj Castle (Podmaniczky Castle)		Veszprém County	Zirc District
Bakonycsernye	Csikling Castle		Fejér County	Mór District
Balassagyarmat	Balassagyarmat Castle		Nógrád County	Balassagyarmat District
Balatonszemes	Bolond Castle		Somogy County	Siófok District
Balatonszentgyörgy	Csillag Castle		Somogy County	Marcali District
Bánd	Esseg Castle		Veszprém County	Veszprém District
Berzence	Berzence Castle		Somogy County	Csurgó District
Beszterec	Vársziget		Szabolcs-Szatmár-Bereg County	Kemecse District
Bokor,_Hungary	Bokor Castle		Nógrád County	Pásztó District
Boldogkőváralja	Boldogkő Castle		Borsod-Abaúj-Zemplén County	Gönc District
Boldogkőváralja	Szentiván Forthill		Borsod-Abaúj-Zemplén County	Gönc District
Borsodivánka	Nagyhalomi Forthill		Borsod-Abaúj-Zemplén County	Mezőkövesd District
Borsosberény	Borsosberényi Castlehill		Nógrád County	Rétság District
Bozsok	Bozsok District		Vas County	Kőszeg District
Buják	Buják Castle		Nógrád County	Pásztó District
Bükkszék	Pós Castle		Heves County	Pétervására District
Bükkszentlászló	Nagy-Sánc		Borsod-Abaúj-Zemplén County	Miskolc District
Bükkzsérc	Füzérkő Castle		Borsod-Abaúj-Zemplén County	Mezőkövesd District
Csabdi	Vasztil Castle		Fejér County	Bicske District
Csabrendek	Banya Castle		Veszprém County	Sümeg District
Csákány	Csákány Castle		Somogy County	Marcali District
Csákánydoroszló	Castle Hill		Vas County	Körmend District
Csepreg	Csepreg Castle		Vas County	Kőszeg District
Csepreg	Gatal Castle		Vas County	Kőszeg District
Csepreg	Hussite Fort		Vas County	Kőszeg District
Csepreg	Malomkert		Vas County	Kőszeg District
Csepreg	Meggyes		Vas County	Kőszeg District
Cserépfalu	Odor Castle		Borsod-Abaúj-Zemplén County	Mezőkövesd District
Cserépváralja	Cserép Castle		Borsod-Abaúj-Zemplén County	Mezőkövesd District
Csesznek	Csesznek Castle		Veszprém County	Zirc District
Csókakő	Csókakő Castle		Fejér County	Mór District
Csongrád	Csongrád Castle		Csongrád County	Csongrád District
Csővár	Csővár Castle		Pest County	Vác District
Dédestapolcsány	Dédes Castle		Borsod-Abaúj-Zemplén County	Kazincbarcika District
Devecser	Devecser Castle		Veszprém County	Devecser District
Diósjenő	Cseh Castle		Nógrád County	Rétság District
Diósjenő	Kámor Castle		Nógrád County	Rétság District
Doba	Somló Castle		Veszprém County	Devecser District
Dombóvár	Dombó Castle (Gólya Castle)		Tolna County	Dombóvár District
Dombóvár	Szigeterdő		Tolna County	Dombóvár District
Domoszló	Oroszlán Castle		Heves County	Gyöngyös District
Dorogháza	Dorogháza-Kastélytető		Nógrád County	Bátonyterenye District
Döbrököz	Döbrököz Castle (Werbőczy Castle)		Tolna County	Dombóvár District
Döbrönte	Szarvaskő Castle		Veszprém County	Pápa District
Dömös	Árpád Castle		Komárom-Esztergom County	Esztergom District
Döröske	Döröske Castle		Vas County	Körmend District
Drégelypalánk	Drégely Castle		Nógrád County	Balassagyarmat District
Dunaföldvár	Csonkatorony		Tolna County	Paks District
Dunaföldvár	Bottyánsánc		Tolna County	Paks District
Écs	Petke Castle		Győr-Moson-Sopron County	Győr District
Ecseg	Ilona Castle		Nógrád County	Pásztó District
Edelény	Borsod Forthill		Borsod-Abaúj-Zemplén County	Edelény District
Eger	Eger Castle		Heves County	Eger District
Egerszalók	Maklyán Castle		Heves County	Eger District
Érd	Kutya Castle		Pest County	Érd District
Esztergom	Esztergom Castle		Komárom-Esztergom County	Esztergom District
Esztergom	Sípoló-hegy		Komárom-Esztergom County	Esztergom District
Fáy	Fáy Kastély		B.O.Z.County	
Fehérvárcsurgó	Károlyi Castle		Fejér County	Mór District
Felsődobsza	Felsődobszai Forthill		Borsod-Abaúj-Zemplén County	Gönc District
Felsőmarác	Tótfalu		Vas County	Körmend District
Felsőnyék	Felsőnyék Castle		Tolna County	Tamási District
Felsőtárkány	Felsőtárkány Castle		Heves County	Eger District
Felsővadász	Felsővadászi Forthill		Borsod-Abaúj-Zemplén County	Szikszó District
Fonyód	Fácános Castle		Somogy County	Fonyód District
Füzér	Füzéri Castle		Borsod-Abaúj-Zemplén County	Sátoraljaújhely District
Galgahévíz	Galgahévíz Forthill		Pest County	Aszód District
Gönc	Amadé Castle		Borsod-Abaúj-Zemplén County	Gönc District
Gyöngyöspata	Gyöngyöspata Castle		Heves County	Gyöngyös District
Gyöngyössolymos	Dezső Castle		Heves County	Gyöngyös District
Gyöngyössolymos	Nyesett Castle		Heves County	Gyöngyös District
Gyöngyössolymos	Gyöngyössolymos Old Castle		Heves County	Gyöngyös District
Gyöngyöstarján	Világos Castle		Heves County	Gyöngyös District
Győr	Püspök Castle		Győr-Moson-Sopron County	Győr District
Gyula	Gyula Castle		Békés County	Gyula District
Gyulakeszi	Csobánc Castle		Veszprém County	Tapolca District
Hangony	Biriny Castle		Borsod-Abaúj-Zemplén County	Ózd District
Harkány	Terehegy Castle		Baranya County	Siklós District
Hatvan	Hatvan Castle		Heves County	Hatvan District
Hegyesd	Hegyesd Castle		Veszprém County	Tapolca District
Hegyfalu	Hegyfalu Forthill		Vas County	Sárvár District
Hegyhátszentmárton	Hegyhátszentmárton Castle		Vas County	Körmend District
Hernádbűd	Hernádbűd Castle		Borsod-Abaúj-Zemplén County	Gönc District
Heves	Heves Castle		Heves County	Heves District
Hollókő	Hollókő Castle		Nógrád County	Szécsény District
Hont	Hont Castle		Nógrád County	Balassagyarmat District
Ikervár	Póka Hill		Vas County	Sárvár District
Imola	Bakbány Castle		Borsod-Abaúj-Zemplén County	Putnok District
Ipolydamásd	Damásd Castle		Pest County	Kőszeg District
Ipolydamásd	Zu Castle		Pest County	Kőszeg District
Ivád	Ivád Castle		Heves County	Pétervására District
Jásd	Márkus Castle		Veszprém County	Várpalota District
Kács	Kács Castle		Borsod-Abaúj-Zemplén County	Mezőkövesd District
Kamond	Nagyváralja		Veszprém County	Devecser District
Kaposszekcső	Leány Castle		Tolna County	Dombóvár District
Kaposvár	Kaposvár Castle		Somogy County	Kaposvár District
Kapuvár	Kapuvár Castle		Győr-Moson-Sopron County	Kapuvár District
Karakó	Karakó Castle		Vas County	Celldömölk District
Kelemér	Mohos Forthill		Borsod-Abaúj-Zemplén County	Putnok District
Kemence	Pogány Castle		Pest County	Kőszeg District
Kemendollár	Kemend Castle		Zala County	Zalaegerszeg District
Kereki	Fehérkő Castle (Katona Castle, Kupa Castle)		Somogy County	Siófok District
Keszthely	Keszthely Castle		Zala County	Keszthely District
Kéthely	Kéthely Castle		Somogy County	Marcali District
Kincsesbánya	Kopaszhegy		Fejér County	Mór District
Kincsesbánya	Középbogárdi Castle		Fejér County	Mór District
Kincsesbánya	Vaskapu		Fejér County	Mór District
Kisgyőr	Alsó-Kecske Castle		Borsod-Abaúj-Zemplén County	Miskolc District
Kisgyőr	Halom Castle		Borsod-Abaúj-Zemplén County	Miskolc District
Kisgyőr	Major Castle		Borsod-Abaúj-Zemplén County	Miskolc District
Kisnána	Kisnána Castle		Heves County	Gyöngyös District
Kisvárda	Kisvárda Castle		Szabolcs-Szatmár-Bereg County	Kisvárda District
Komárom	Fort Monostor		Komárom-Esztergom County	Komárom District
Komlóska	Solymos Castle		Borsod-Abaúj-Zemplén County	Sárospatak District
Kóspallag	Pusztatorony		Pest County	Szob District
Kőszeg	Jurisics Castle		Vas County	Kőszeg District
Kőszeg	Kőszeg-Óház		Vas County	Kőszeg District
Leányvár	Kolostorhegy		Komárom-Esztergom County	Esztergom District
Lucfalva	Pogány Castle		Nógrád County	Salgótarján District
Magyaregregy	Máré Castle		Baranya County	Komló District
Máriakéménd	Máriakéméndi Castle (Török Castle)		Baranya County	Bóly District
Márianosztra	Zu Castle (Ódamásd Castle)		Pest County	Szob District
Markaz	Markaz Castle		Heves County	Gyöngyös District
Mátraderecske	Kanázs Castle		Heves County	Pétervására District
Mátrafüred	Bene Castle		Heves County	Gyöngyös District
Mátrafüred	Muzslatető		Heves County	Gyöngyös District
Mátrakeresztes	Old Castle		Nógrád County	Pásztó District
Mátramindszent	Old Castle		Nógrád County	Bátonyterenye District
Mátraszentimre	Galya Castle		Heves County	Gyöngyös District
Mátraszentlászló	Orosz Mátyás Castle		Heves County	Gyöngyös District
Mátraszőlős	Small Castle		Nógrád County	Pásztó District
Mecseknádasd	Réka Castle		Baranya County	Pécsvárad District
Meszes	Meszes Forthill		Borsod-Abaúj-Zemplén County	Edelény District
Méra	Felsőméra Forthill		Borsod-Abaúj-Zemplén County	Encs District
Miskolc	Leány Castle		Borsod-Abaúj-Zemplén County	Miskolc District
Miskolc	Diósgyőr Castle		Borsod-Abaúj-Zemplén County	Miskolc District
Monoszló	Hegyestű Castle		Veszprém County	Balatonfüred District
Mosonmagyaróvár	Mosonmagyaróvár Castle		Győr-Moson-Sopron County	Mosonmagyaróvár District
Nagyecsed	Ecsed Castle		Szabolcs-Szatmár-Bereg County	Mátészalka District
Nagyharsány	Szársomlyó Castle		Baranya County	Siklós District
Nagykálló	Kálló Castle		Szabolcs-Szatmár-Bereg County	Nagykálló District
Nagykanizsa	Kanizsa Castle		Zala County	Nagykanizsa District
Nagykarácsony	Ménesmajor		Fejér County	Dunaújváros District
Nagykereki	Bocskai Castle		Hajdú-Bihar County	Berettyóújfalu District
Nagylóc	Nagylóc Castle		Nógrád County	Szécsény District
Nagysáp	Gedáshegy		Komárom-Esztergom County	Esztergom District
Nagyvázsony	Kinizsi Castle		Veszprém County	Veszprém District
Neszmély	Small Castle		Komárom-Esztergom County	Tata District
Neszmély	Big Castle		Komárom-Esztergom County	Tata District
Nézsa	Nézsa Castle		Nógrád County	Rétság District
Nógrád	Nógrád Castle		Nógrád County	Rétság District
Nógrádsáp	Tatárka		Nógrád County	Rétság District
Nógrádsipek	Sztrahora Castle		Nógrád County	Szécsény District
Nógrádszakál	Kastélydomb		Nógrád County	Szécsény District
Nyergesújfalu	Sánc-hegy		Komárom-Esztergom County	Esztergom District
Nyírbátor	Nyírbátor Castle		Szabolcs-Szatmár-Bereg County	Nyírbátor District
Nyírkarász	Gara-halom		Szabolcs-Szatmár-Bereg County	Kisvárda District
Ónod	Ónod Castle		Borsod-Abaúj-Zemplén County	Miskolc District
Orfű	Vízfő-forrás Castle		Baranya County	Pécs District
Oroszlány	Gerencsér Castle		Komárom-Esztergom County	Oroszlány District
Oroszlány	Szentgyörgy Castle		Komárom-Esztergom County	Oroszlány District
Ostffyasszonyfa	Csonka Castle		Vas County	Celldömölk District
Őrimagyarósd	Kastélypart		Vas County	Körmend District
Őrtilos	Zrínyiúj Castle		Somogy County	Csurgó District
Öskü	Öskü Castle		Veszprém County	Várpalota District
Ötvöskónyi	Báthori Castle		Somogy County	Nagyatád District
Ozora	Ozorai Pipó Castle		Tolna County	Tamási District
Pápa	Pápa Castle		Veszprém County	Pápa District
Papkeszi	Kalapos Castle-tető (Körmösd Castle)		Veszprém County	Balatonalmádi District
Parád	Marhád Castle		Heves County	Pétervására District
Parád	Vörös Castle		Heves County	Pétervására District
Pásztó	Ágas Castle		Nógrád County	Pásztó District
Pásztó	Hasznos Castle		Nógrád County	Pásztó District
Pásztó	Hasznos Old Castle		Nógrád County	Pásztó District
Pécs	Pécs Castle		Baranya County	Pécs District
Pécs	Kanta Castle		Baranya County	Pécs District
Pécsely	Zádor Castle		Veszprém County	Balatonfüred District
Pécsvárad	Kósza Castle		Baranya County	Pécsvárad District
Perőcsény	Salgó Castle		Pest County	Szob District
Petőmihályfa	Márványkő Castle		Vas County	Vasvár District
Pocsaj	Pocsaj Castle		Hajdú-Bihar County	Derecske District
Pocsaj	Leány Castle		Hajdú-Bihar County	Derecske District
Pocsaj	Hosszúzug Castle		Hajdú-Bihar County	Derecske District
Pocsaj	Hídköz Castle		Hajdú-Bihar County	Derecske District
Pomáz	Klissza Castle		Pest County	Szentendre District
Pölöske	Pölöske Castle		Zala County	Zalaegerszeg District
Pusztavám	Gerencsér Castle		Fejér County	Mór District
Püspökszentlászló	Zengő Castle		Baranya County	Pécs District
Putnok	Kakas Castle		Borsod-Abaúj-Zemplén County	Putnok District
Recsk	Szederjes Castle		Heves County	Pétervására District
Regéc	Regéc Castle		Borsod-Abaúj-Zemplén County	Gönc District
Rezi	Rez Castle		Zala County	Keszthely District
Sajógalgóc	Sajógalgóci Castle		Borsod-Abaúj-Zemplén County	Kazincbarcika District
Sajómercse	Sajómercsei Castle		Borsod-Abaúj-Zemplén County	Putnok District
Sajónémeti	Sajónémeti Castle		Borsod-Abaúj-Zemplén County	Putnok District
Sajóvelezd	Sajóvelezdi Castle		Borsod-Abaúj-Zemplén County	Putnok District
Salgóbánya	Salgó Castle		Nógrád County	Salgótarján District
Salgótarján	Baglyaskő Castle		Nógrád County	Salgótarján District
Salgótarján	Pécskő		Nógrád County	Salgótarján District
Salgótarján	Zagyvafő Castle		Nógrád County	Salgótarján District
Sály	Lator Castle		Borsod-Abaúj-Zemplén County	Mezőkövesd District
Sály	Léleklyuk		Borsod-Abaúj-Zemplén County	Mezőkövesd District
Sály	Örsúr Castle		Borsod-Abaúj-Zemplén County	Mezőkövesd District
Sámsonháza	Fejérkő Castle		Nógrád County	Salgótarján District
Sárospatak	Pataki Castle		Borsod-Abaúj-Zemplén County	Sárospatak District
Sárvár	Sárvár Castle		Vas County	Sárvár District
Sátoraljaújhely	Sátoraljaújhely Castle		Borsod-Abaúj-Zemplén County	Sátoraljaújhely District
Siklós	Siklós Castle		Baranya County	Siklós District
Simontornya	Simontornya Castle		Tolna County	Tamási District
Sióagárd	Janya Castle		Tolna County	Szekszárd District
Sirok	Sirok Castle		Heves County	Pétervására District
Solymár	Solymár Castle		Pest County	Pilisvörösvár District
Somogyvár	Somogy Castle		Somogy County	Fonyód District
Somogyzsitfa	Szőcsény Castle		Somogy County	Marcali District
Sopron	Sopron Castle		Győr-Moson-Sopron County	Sopron District
Sorkifalud	Zalak		Vas County	Szombathely District
Sümeg	Sümeg Castle		Veszprém County	Sümeg District
Szabolcs	Szabolcs Forthill		Szabolcs-Szatmár-Bereg County	Nyíregyháza District
Szabadbattyán	Kula Castle		Fejér County	Székesfehérvár District
Szalaszend	Hönig Castle		Borsod-Abaúj-Zemplén County	Szalaszend District
Szamosangyalos	Domahídy-hegy		Szabolcs-Szatmár-Bereg County	Csenger District
Szanda	Péterhegy		Nógrád County	Balassagyarmat District
Szanda	Szanda Castle		Nógrád County	Balassagyarmat District
Szanda	Szanda Castle ramparts		Nógrád County	Balassagyarmat District
Szarvaskő	Szarvaskő Castle		Heves County	Eger District
Szászvár	Szászvár Castle		Baranya County	Komló District
Szécsény	Szécsény Castle		Nógrád County	Szécsény District
Szécsény	Kerekdomb		Nógrád County	Szécsény District
Szeged	Szeged Castle		Csongrád County	Szeged District
Szegi	Szeg Castle		Borsod-Abaúj-Zemplén County	Tokaj District
Szegvár	Szegvár Castle		Csongrád County	Szentes District
Székesfehérvár	Bory Castle		Fejér County	Székesfehérvár District
Székesfehérvár	Székesfehérvár Castle		Fejér County	Székesfehérvár District
Szendrő	Szendrő Castle		Borsod-Abaúj-Zemplén County	Edelény District
Szendrőlád	Szendrőládi Castle		Borsod-Abaúj-Zemplén County	Edelény District
Szenyér	Szenyér Castle		Somogy County	Marcali District
Szentgyörgyvár	Béka Castle		Zala County	Keszthely District
Szerencs	Szerencs Castle		Borsod-Abaúj-Zemplén County	Szerencs District
Szerencs	Takta Forthill		Borsod-Abaúj-Zemplén County	Szerencs District
Szigetvár	Szigetvári Castle		Baranya County	Szigetvár District
Szigliget	Szigligeti Castle		Veszprém County	Tapolca District
Szigliget	Szigliget Old Castle		Veszprém County	Tapolca District
Szihalom	Árpád Castle		Heves County	Füzesabony District
Szilaspogony	Kis-kő		Nógrád County	Salgótarján District
Szilvásvárad	Éleskő Castle		Heves County	Bélapátfalva District
Szilvásvárad	Gerenna Castle		Heves County	Bélapátfalva District
Szokolya	Pap-hegy Castle		Pest County	Szob District
Szolnok	Szolnok Castle		Jász-Nagykun-Szolnok County	Szolnok District
Szombathely	Szombathely Castle		Vas County	Szombathely District
Szögliget	Szág Castle		Borsod-Abaúj-Zemplén County	Edelény District
Szögliget	Szögliget Old Castle		Borsod-Abaúj-Zemplén County	Edelény District
Szuha	Várbérc		Nógrád County	Bátonyterenye District
Szuhogy	Csorbakő Castle		Borsod-Abaúj-Zemplén County	Edelény District
Szügy	Leányhegy		Nógrád County	Balassagyarmat District
Tállya	Tállya Castle		Borsod-Abaúj-Zemplén County	Szerencs District
Tamási	Tamási Castle		Tolna County	Tamási District
Tapolca	Tapolca Castle		Veszprém County	Tapolca District
Tarján	Tarján Castle		Komárom-Esztergom County	Tatabánya District
Tarnalelesz	Köböl Castle		Heves County	Pétervására District
Tarnaszentmária	Verpeléti Castle		Heves County	Eger District
Tata	Tata Castle		Komárom-Esztergom County	Tata District
Telkibánya	Telkibányai Forthill		Borsod-Abaúj-Zemplén County	Gönc District
Tihany	Csúcshegy		Veszprém County	Balatonfüred District
Tinnye	Aynard Castle		Pest County	Pilisvörösvár District
Tokaj	Tokaj Castle		Borsod-Abaúj-Zemplén County	Tokaj District
Tolmács	Calvary Hill		Nógrád County	Rétság District
Tömörd	Ilona Castle		Vas County	Kőszeg District
Törökszentmiklós	Balaszentmiklós Castle		Jász-Nagykun-Szolnok County	Törökszentmiklós District
Ugod	Ugod Castle		Veszprém County	Pápa District
Uppony	Dede Castle		Borsod-Abaúj-Zemplén County	Ózd District
Uppony	Upponyi Forthill		Borsod-Abaúj-Zemplén County	Ózd District
Vác	Vác Castle		Pest County	Vác District
Vadna	Vadna Castle		Borsod-Abaúj-Zemplén County	Kazincbarcika District
Vámosatya	Büdy Castle		Szabolcs-Szatmár-Bereg County	Vásárosnamény District
Vanyarc	Hraszti		Nógrád County	Pásztó District
Váralja	Várfő		Tolna County	Bonyhád District
Várgesztes	Gesztes Castle		Komárom-Esztergom County	Tatabánya District
Várgesztes	Small Castle		Komárom-Esztergom County	Tatabánya District
Várkesző	Várkesző Castle		Veszprém County	Pápa District
Várpalota	Bátorkő (Puszta Palace)		Veszprém County	Várpalota District
Várpalota	Várpalota Castle		Veszprém County	Várpalota District
Városlőd	Hölgykő Castle		Veszprém County	Ajka District
Vaskút	Vaskúti Castle		Bács-Kiskun County	Baja District
Velem	Szentvid		Vas County	Kőszeg District
Verpelét	Verpeléti Forthill		Heves County	Eger District
Gánt	Oroszlánkő Castle (Csáki Castle)		Fejér County	Bicske District
Vértessomló	Vitány Castle		Komárom-Esztergom County	Tatabánya District
Veszprém	Veszprém Castle		Veszprém County	Veszprém District
Visegrád	Visegrád Castle		Pest County	Szentendre District
Zalacsány	Török Castle		Zala County	Keszthely District
Zalaegerszeg	Zalaegerszeg Castle		Zala County	Zalaegerszeg District
Zalaszántó	Tátika Castle		Zala County	Keszthely District
Zalaszegvár	Ókarakó Castle		Veszprém County	Sümeg District
Zalavár	Zala Castle		Zala County	Keszthely District
Zámoly	Zámolyi őrtorony		Fejér County	Székesfehérvár District

== See also ==
- Palaces and mansions in Hungary
- List of castles in Europe
