= Tapolca District =

Coordinates: 46.88266477683308°N 17.440816218643985°E

Tapolca District Tapolcai járás
- Districts of Hungary
- Coat of arms

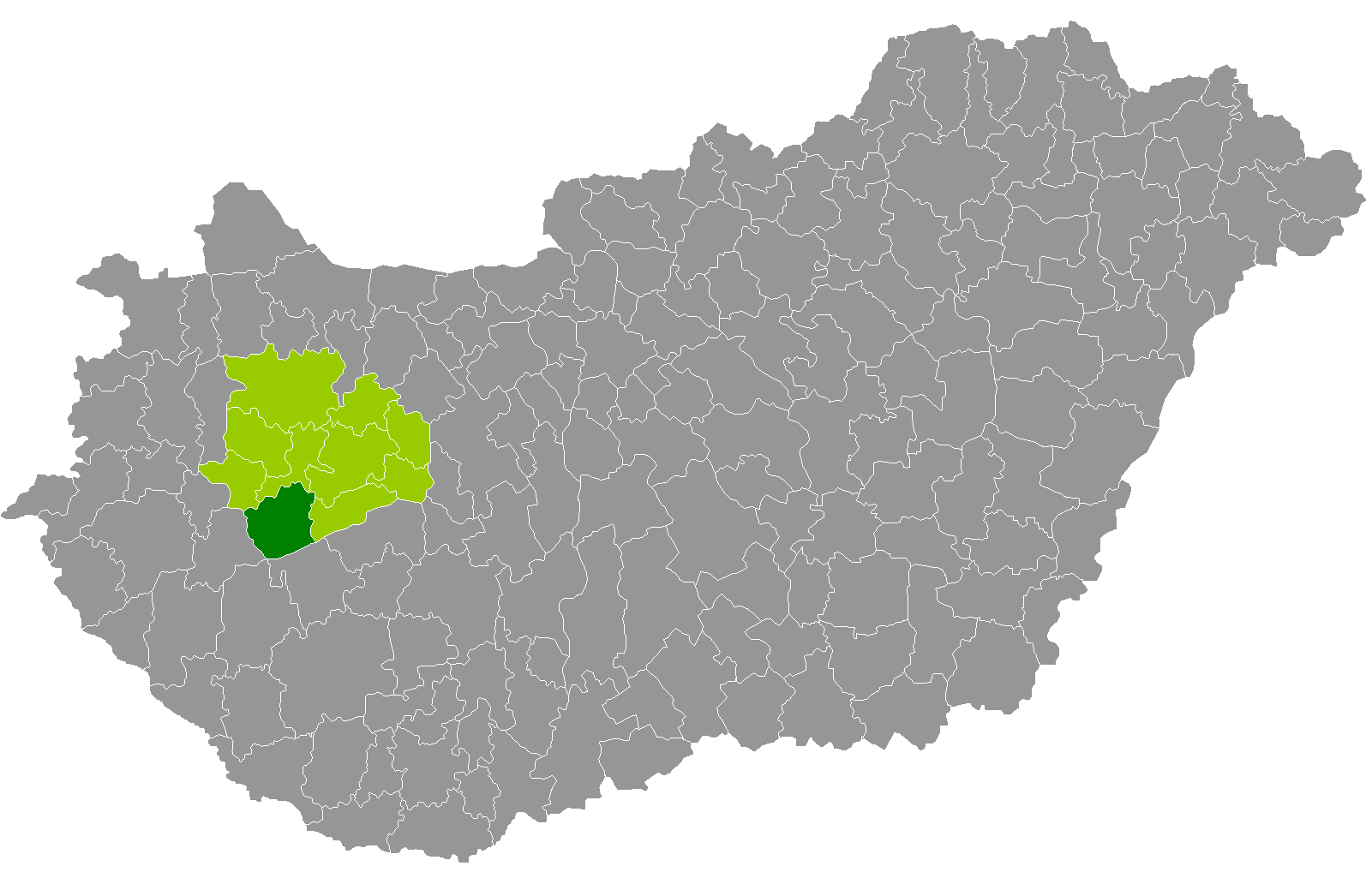
- Tapolcai District within Hungary and Veszprém County.
- Country: Hungary
- County: Veszprém
- District seat: Tapolca

Area
  - Total: 540.30 km^{2} (208.61 sq mi)
  - Rank: 3rd in Veszprém

Population (2011 census)
  - Total: 34,256
  - Rank: 5th in Veszprém
  - Density: 63/km^{2} (160/sq mi)

Tapolca (Hungarian: Tapolcai járás) is a district in south-western part of Veszprém County. Tapolca is also the name of the town where the district seat is found. The district is located in the Central Transdanubia Statistical Region.

== Geography ==
Tapolca District borders with Sümeg District and Ajka District to the north, Veszprém District and Balatonfüred District to the east, Fonyód District (Somogy County) to the south, Keszthely District (Zala County) to the west. The number of the inhabited places in Tapolca District is 33.

== Municipalities ==
The district has 2 towns, 1 large village and 30 villages. (population as of 1 January 2013)

- Ábrahámhegy (441)
- **Badacsonytomaj** (2,178)
- Badacsonytördemic (871)
- Balatonederics (1,030)
- Balatonhenye (113)
- Balatonrendes (134)
- Gyulakeszi (710)
- Hegyesd (162)
- Hegymagas (272)
- Kapolcs (370)
- Káptalantóti (452)
- Kékkút (81)
- Kisapáti (326)
- Köveskál (361)
- Kővágóörs (819)
- Lesencefalu (321)
- Lesenceistvánd (949)
- Lesencetomaj (1,141)
- Mindszentkálla (269)
- Monostorapáti (1,176)
- Nemesgulács (926)
- Nemesvita (325)
- Raposka (221)
- Révfülöp (1,187)
- Salföld (72)
- Sáska (289)
- Szentbékkálla (189)
- Szigliget (814)
- Taliándörögd (754)
- **Tapolca** (15,966) – district seat
- Uzsa (333)
- Vigántpetend (199)
- Zalahaláp (1,238)

The bolded municipalities are cities, italics municipality is large village.

== See also ==
- List of cities and towns in Hungary
