= Saska =

Saska may refer to:

- Sáska, village in Hungary
- SASKA, political party in Slovakia
