= Sümeg District =

Coordinates: 46.97759250890195°N 17.282119613370924°E

Sümeg District Sümegi járás
- Districts of Hungary
- Coat of arms

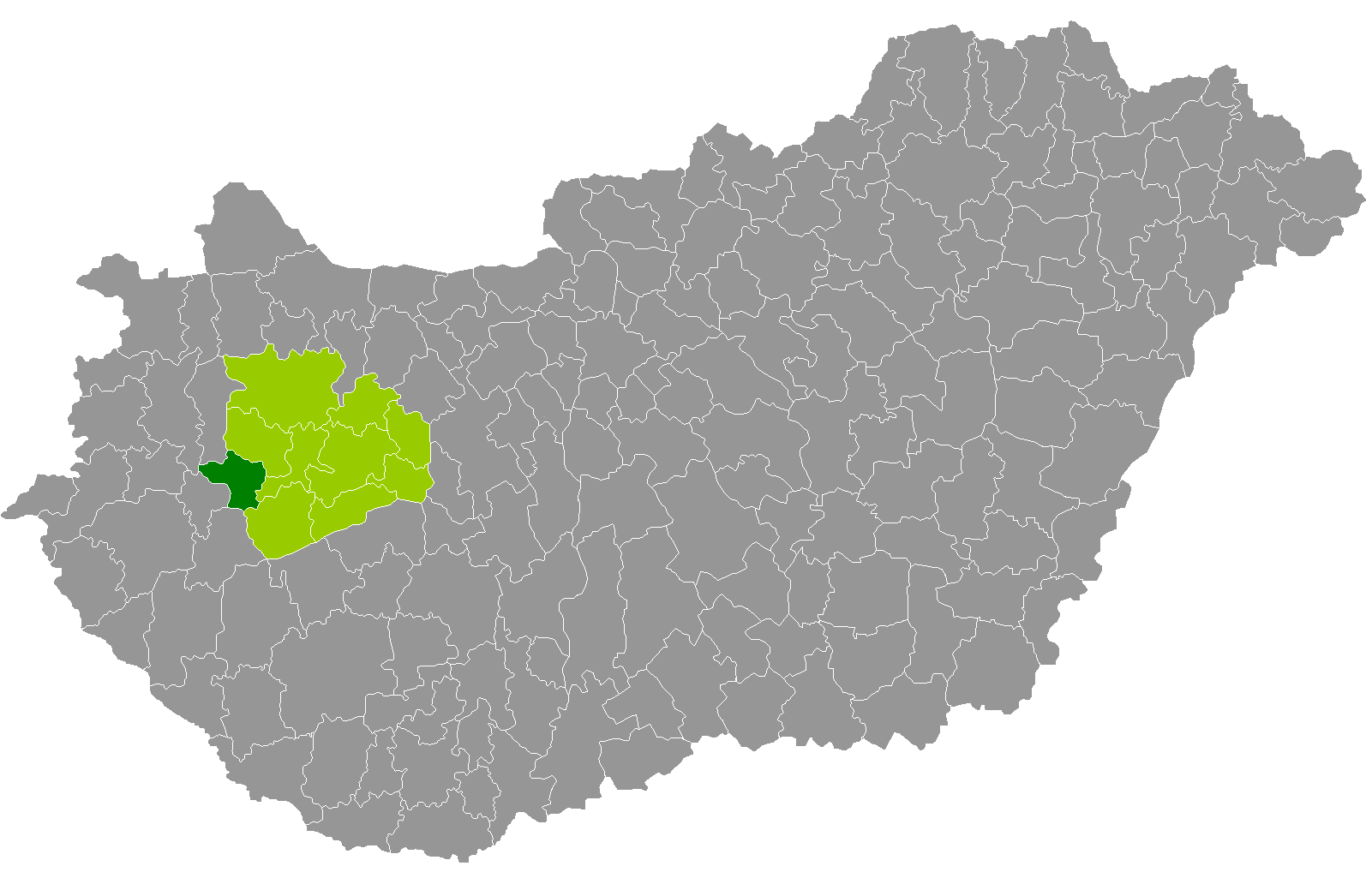
- Sümegi District within Hungary and Veszprém County.
- Country: Hungary
- County: Veszprém
- District seat: Sümeg

Area
  - Total: 306.48 km^{2} (118.33 sq mi)
  - Rank: 8th in Veszprém

Population (2011 census)
  - Total: 15,358
  - Rank: 9th in Veszprém
  - Density: 50/km^{2} (130/sq mi)

Sümeg (Hungarian: Sümegi járás) is a district in western part of Veszprém County. Sümeg is also the name of the town where the district seat is found. The district is located in the Central Transdanubia Statistical Region.

== Geography ==
Sümeg District borders with Celldömölk District (Vas County) and Devecser District to the north and east, Ajka District to the east, Tapolca District and Keszthely District (Zala County) to the south, Zalaszentgrót District (Zala County) and Sárvár District (Vas County) to the west. The number of the inhabited places in Sümeg District is 21.

== Municipalities ==
The district has 1 town and 20 villages. (ordered by population, as of 1 January 2013)

- Bazsi (388)
- Bodorfa (100)
- Csabrendek (3,113)
- Dabronc (425)
- Gógánfa (796)
- Gyepükaján (323)
- Hetyefő (73)
- Hosztót (61)
- Káptalanfa (840)
- Megyer (23)
- Nemeshany (409)
- Rigács (194)
- **Sümeg** (6,357) – district seat
- Sümegprága (613)
- Szentimrefalva (202)
- Ukk (322)
- Veszprémgalsa (279)
- Zalaerdőd (250)
- Zalagyömörő (445)
- Zalameggyes (43)
- Zalaszegvár (134)

The bolded municipality is city.

== See also ==
- List of cities and towns in Hungary
