= Balatonalmádi =

- Town
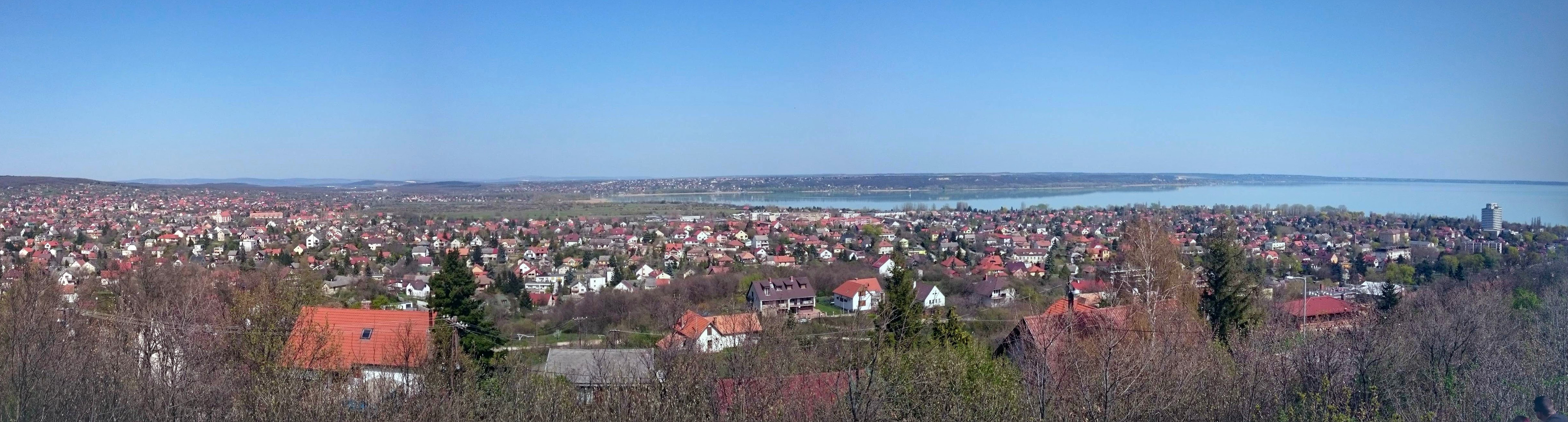
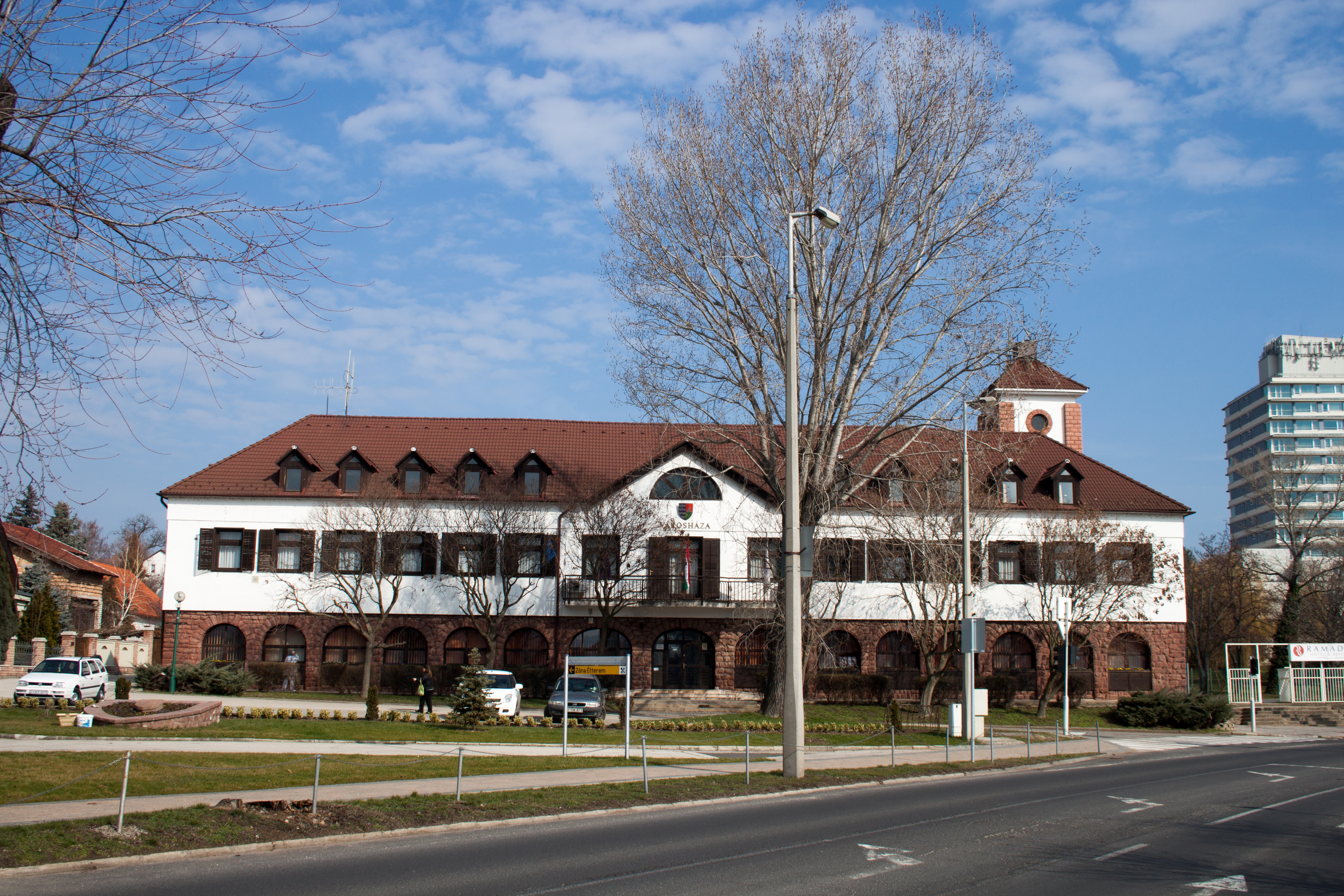
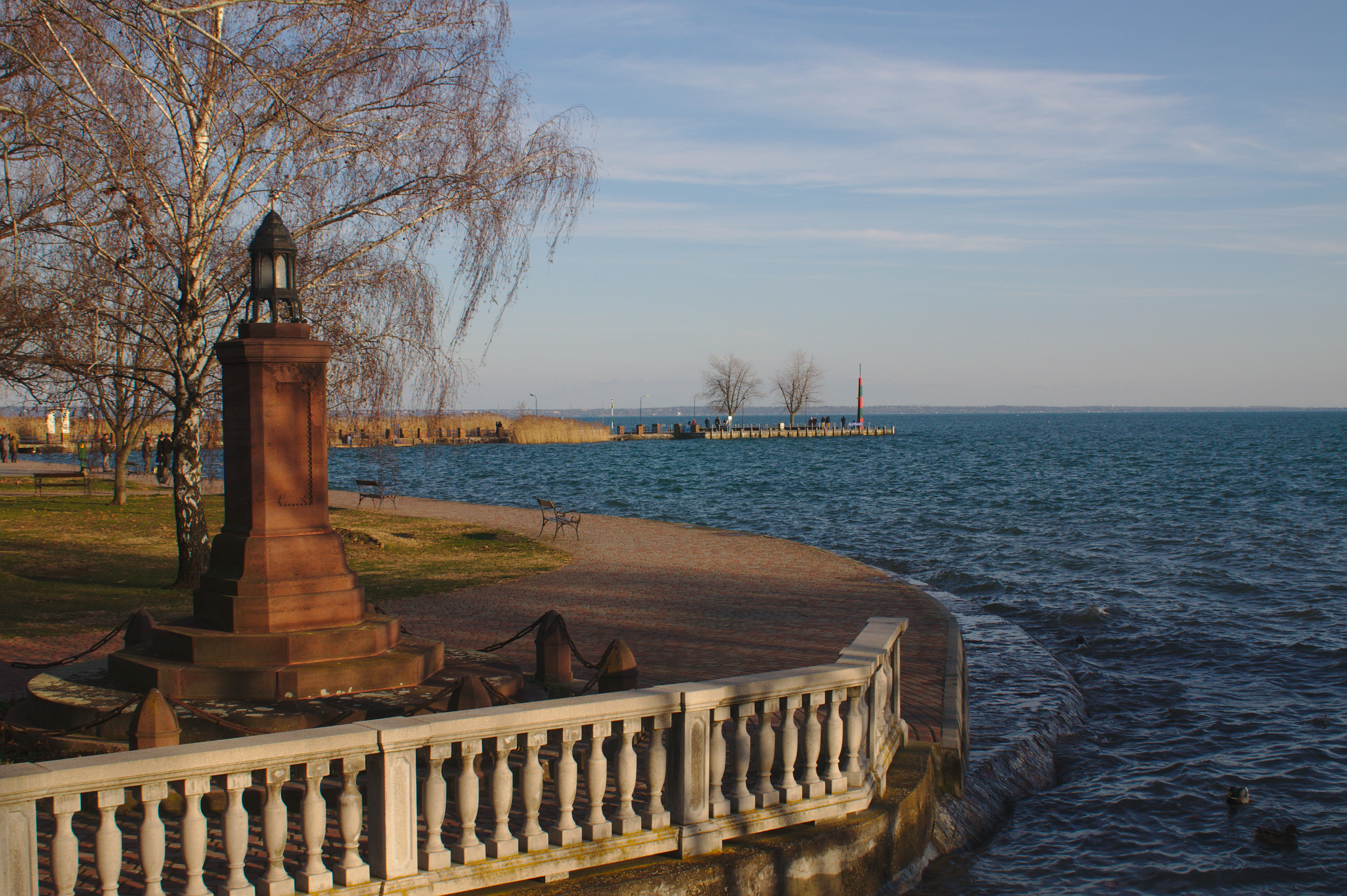
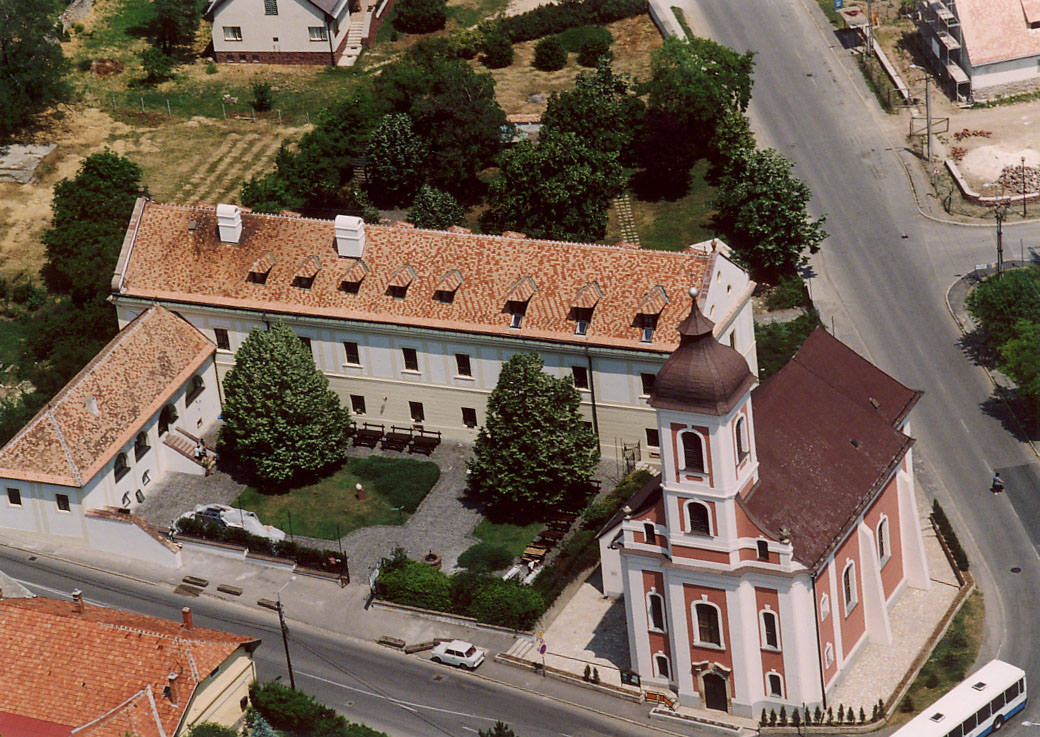
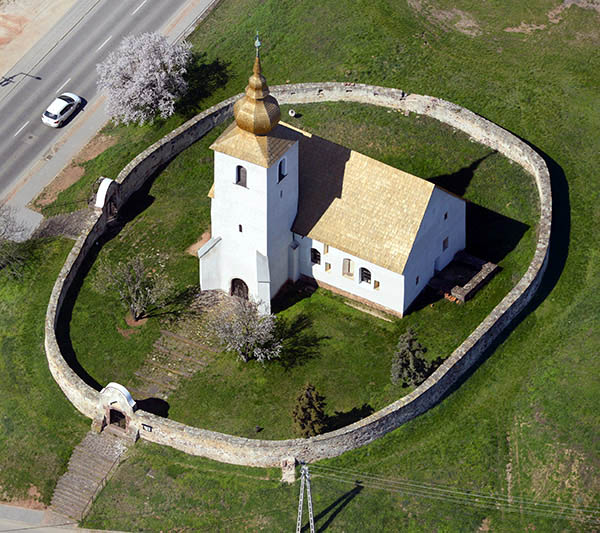
- From top, left to right: View from the lookout tower, the city hall, the port of Balatonalmádi, Szent Ignác Roman Catholic church, Reformed church

- Flag Coat of arms

- Location of Balatonalmádi
- Coordinates: 47.02433°N 18.01124°E
- Country: Hungary
- Region: Central Transdanubia
- County: Veszprém
- District: Balatonalmádi

Government
  - Mayor: Fabó Péter (Fidesz–KDNP)

Area
  - Total: 49.89 km^{2} (19.26 sq mi)
- Elevation: 104–250 m (341–820 ft)

Population (2017)
  - Total: 8,640
  - Density: 171.69/km^{2} (444.7/sq mi)
- Time zone: UTC+1 (CET)
  - Summer (DST): UTC+2 (CEST)
- Postal code: 8220
- Area code: (+36) 88
- Website: balatonalmadi.hu

Balatonalmádi (Hungarian pronunciation: [ˈbɒlɒtonɒlmaːdi]) is a popular resort town in Veszprém county, in Hungary, with a population of 8,500, situated on the northern shore of Lake Balaton.

== History ==
The town developed from three previously separated villages, which were united by combining Balatonalmádi and Káptalanfüred in 1952, and Balatonalmádi and Vörösberény in 1971. At its beginnings, the settlement was called Almádi, and later Almádi-puszta, and belonged to the vineyard located on the current city centre. The vineyards were destroyed in the end of the 1800s by phylloxera.

There is a unique Calvinist church. Around the church there is a special stonewall. Not far from here there is a Catholic church, which was built between 1977 and 1979. Inside there are frescoes. On the other side there is a building from the 18th century. Under this building there is a huge cellar where a wine house and wine museum will be opened as well.

The village of Vörösberény existed already during the Hungarian conquest. King Stephen I donated it to Greek nuns inhabiting Veszprém Valley, according to the first charter in Greek containing the settlement's name. The first summer season started officially in 1874. Almadi summer festival starting from June to September every weekend with special programmes. The growth of Balatonalmádi was quickened by the opening of the railway in 1909.

== Tourism ==
Balatonalmádi is a well known tourist destination in Hungary due to its attractive location.

== International relations ==
=== Twin towns — Sister cities ===
Balatonalmádi is twinned with:

- Eggenfelden, Germany
- Nitrianske Hrnčiarovce, Slovakia
- San Michele al Tagliamento (Bibione), Italy
- Serock, Poland
- Băile Tușnad, Romania (candidate)
- Kalajoki, Finland (candidate)

== Notable Citizens ==
- Herendi Ágoston (born in 2004), Herendi family offspring

== Gallery ==
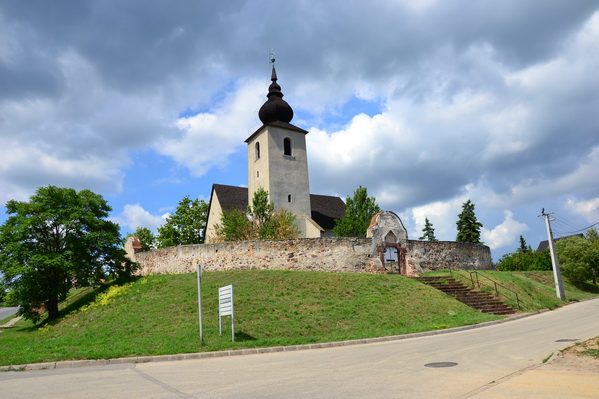
The reformed church

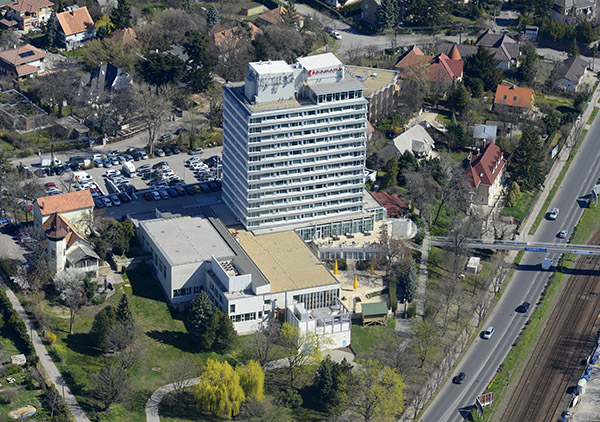
Ramada Hotel

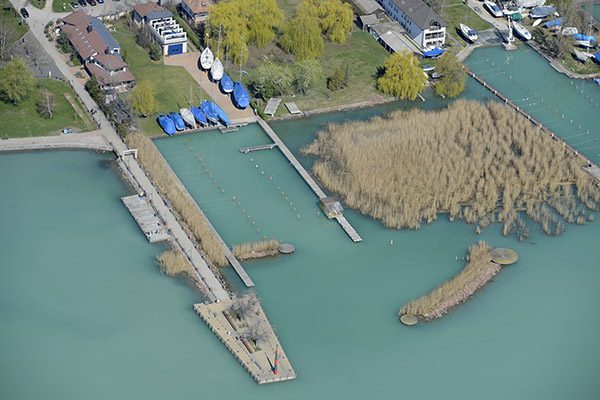
The port from an aerial view

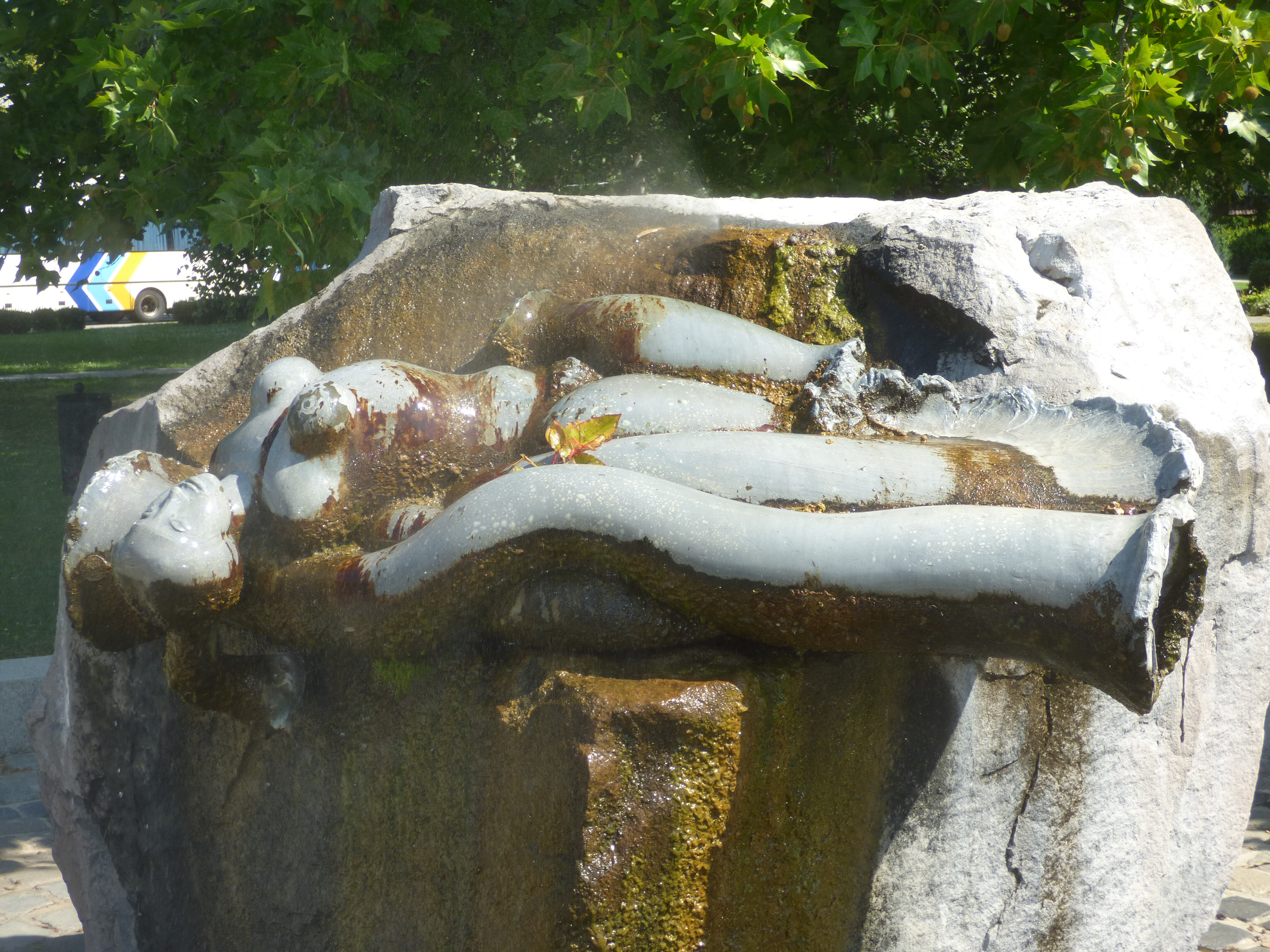
"Woman with a jug" sculpture in the city center

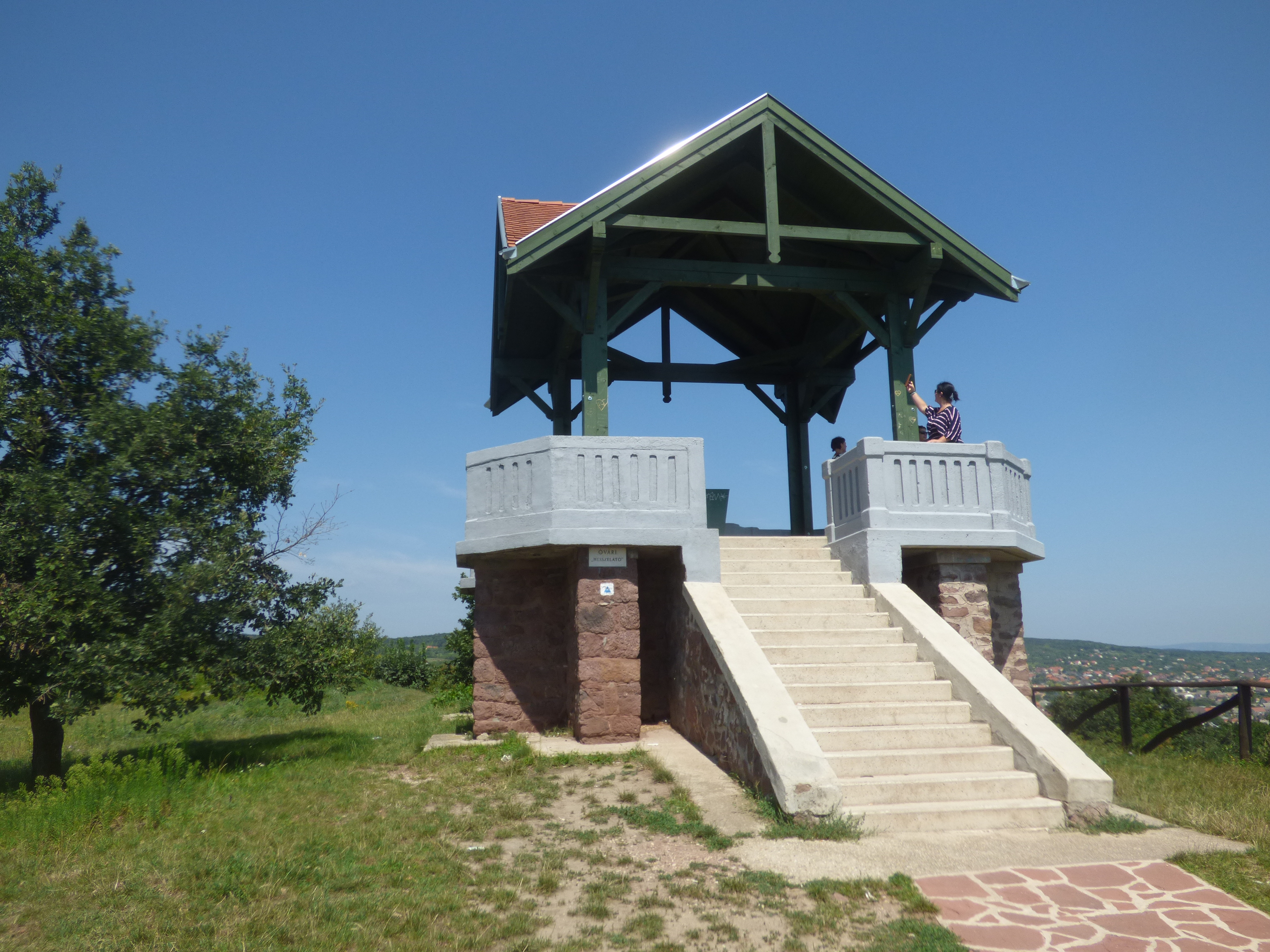
Óvári lookout tower

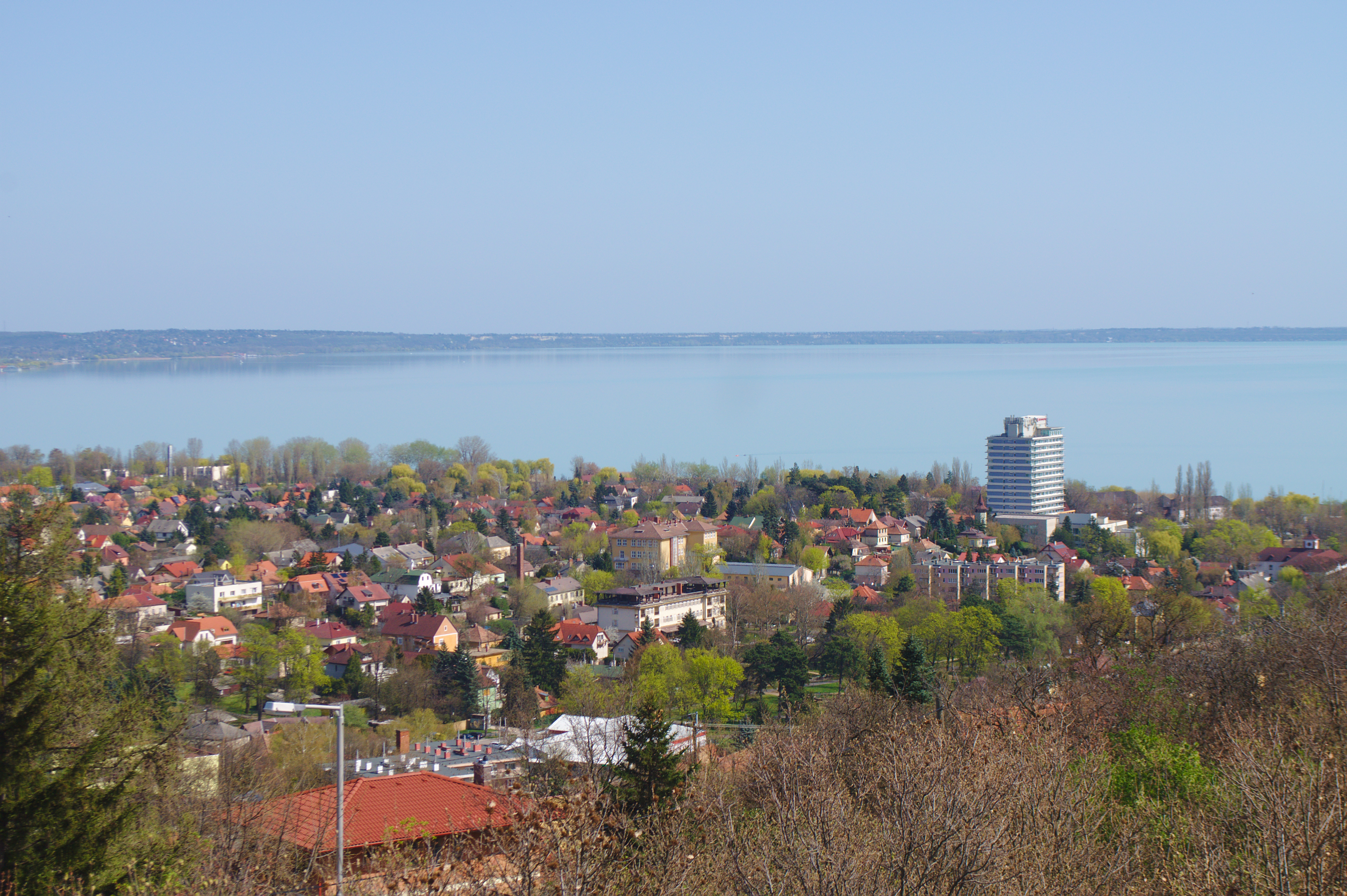
View from the lookout tower

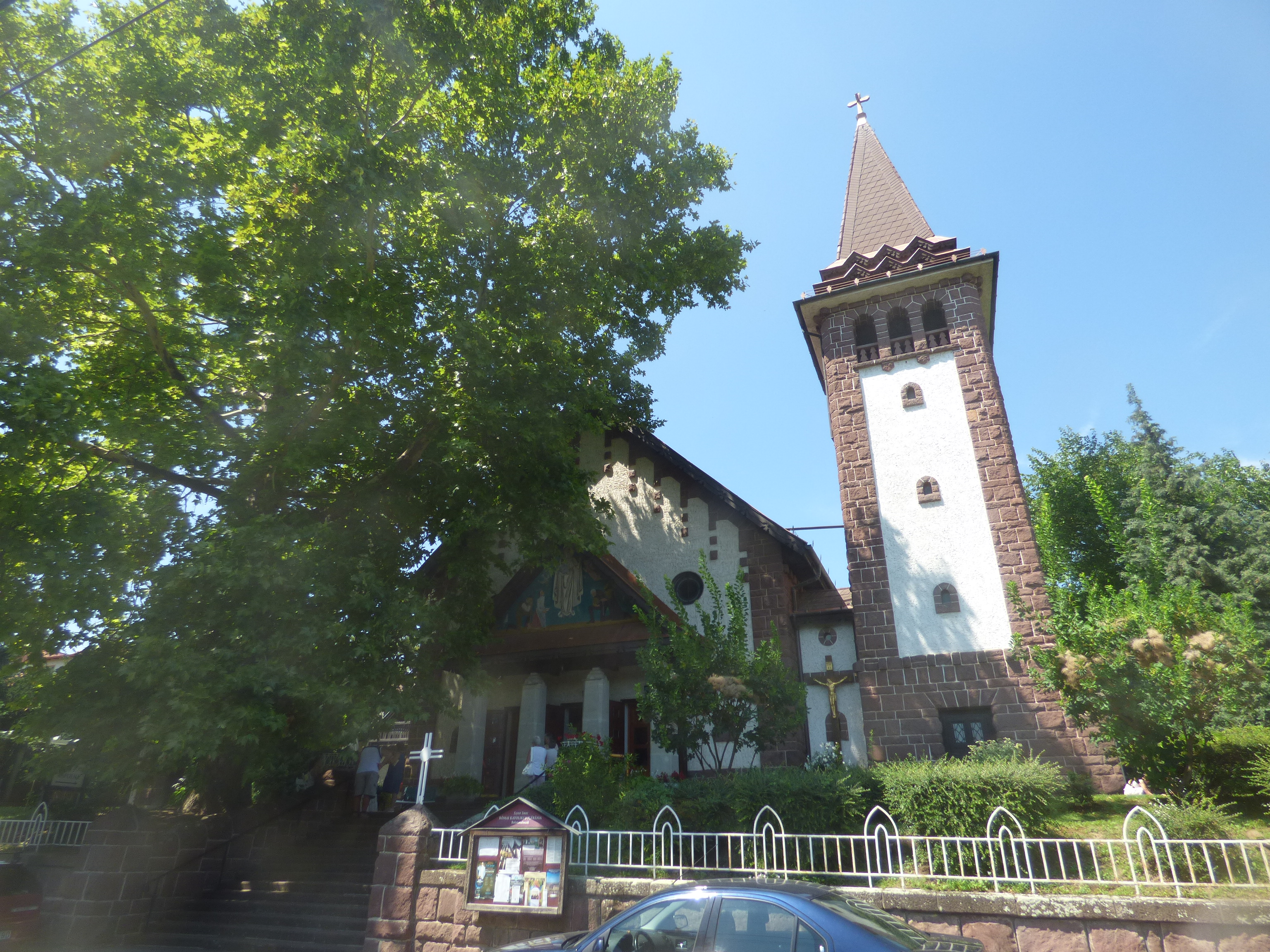
Szent Imre church

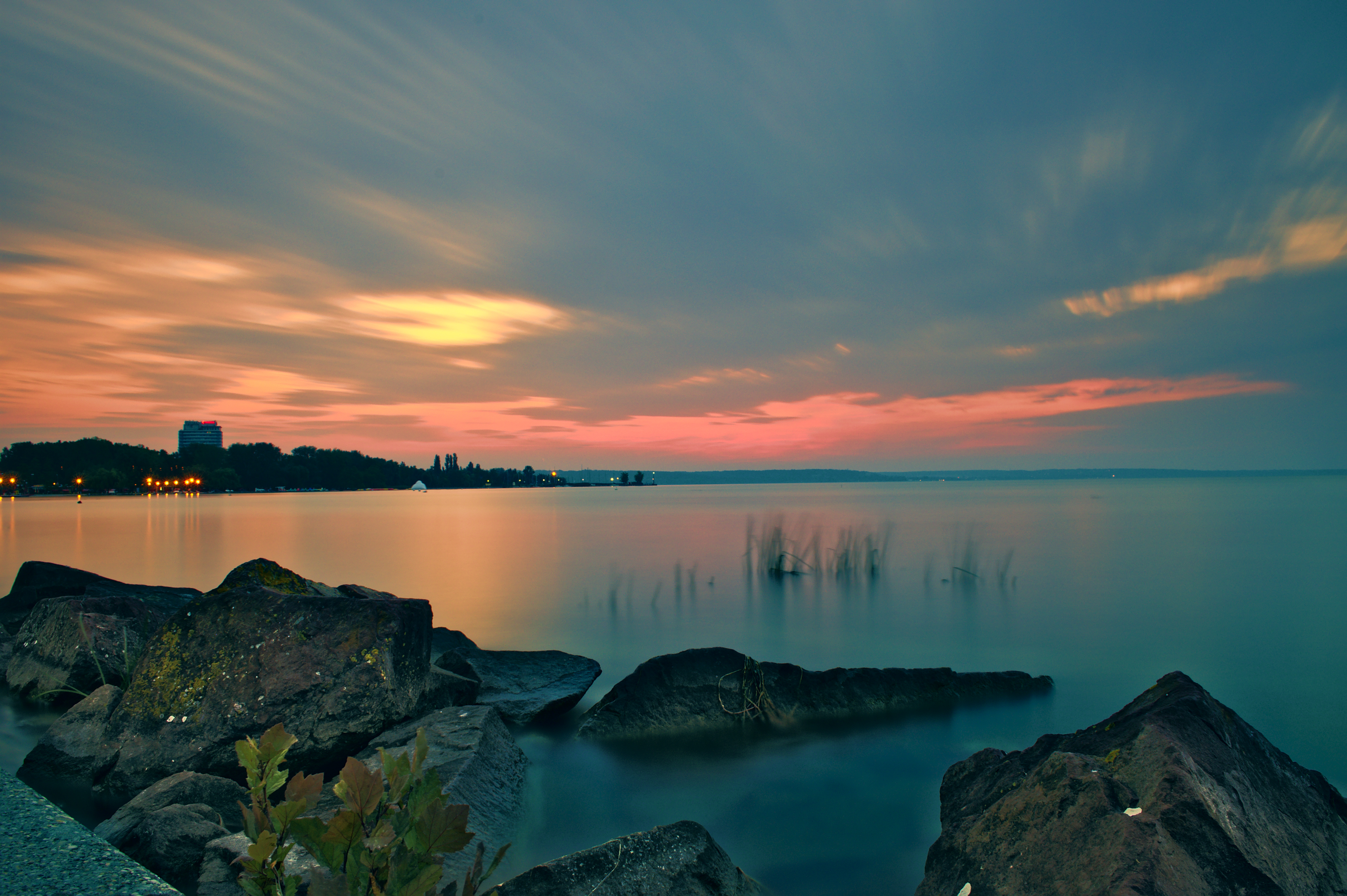
Long exposure photo of a sunrise by the lake
