= Tamási District =

Coordinates: 46.633353632143084°N 18.283819316294867°E

Tamási District Tamási járás
- Districts of Hungary
- Coat of arms

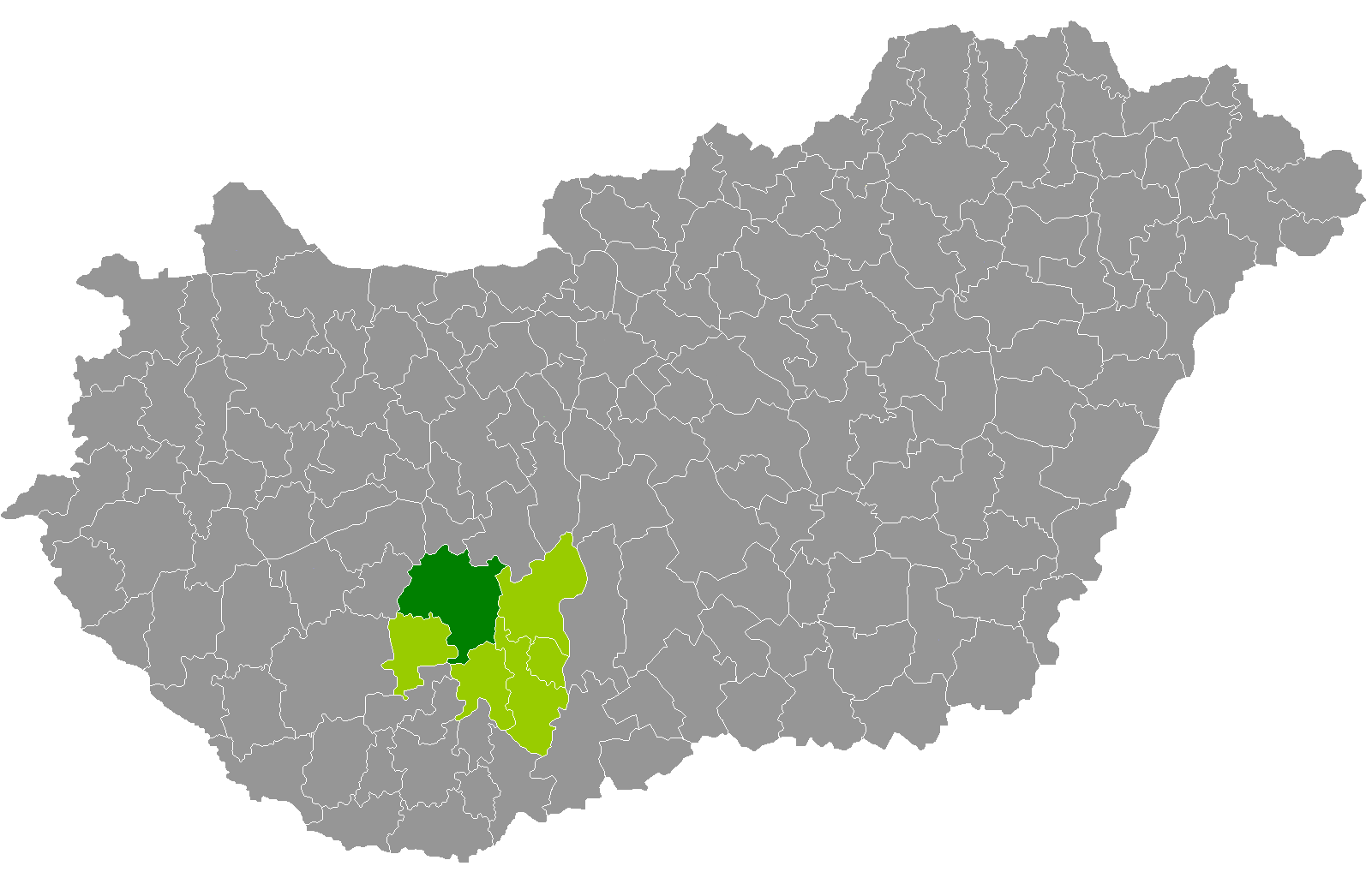
- Tamási District within Hungary and Tolna County.
- Country: Hungary
- County: Tolna
- District seat: Tamási

Area
  - Total: 1,019.94 km^{2} (393.80 sq mi)
  - Rank: 1st in Tolna

Population (2011 census)
  - Total: 38,705
  - Rank: 3rd in Tolna
  - Density: 38/km^{2} (98/sq mi)

Tamási (Hungarian: Tamási járás) is a district in north-western part of Tolna County in Hungary. Tamási is also the name of the town where the district seat is found. The district is located in the Southern Transdanubia Statistical Region.

== Geography ==
Tamási District borders with Enying District and Sárbogárd District (Fejér County) to the north, Paks District and Szekszárd District to the east, Bonyhád District and Hegyhát District (Baranya County) to the south, Dombóvár District to the southwest, Tab District and Siófok District (Somogy County) to the west. The number of the inhabited places in Tamási District is 32.

== Municipalities ==
The district has 3 towns, 2 large villages and 27 villages. (ordered by population, as of 1 January 2013)

- Belecska (388)
- Diósberény (346)
- Dúzs (258)
- Értény (803)
- Felsőnyék (1,029)
- Fürged (726)
- **Gyönk** (2,091)
- Hőgyész (2,904)
- Iregszemcse (2,692)
- Kalaznó (145)
- Keszőhidegkút (207)
- Kisszékely (324)
- Koppányszántó (326)
- Magyarkeszi (1,278)
- Miszla (292)
- Mucsi (448)
- Nagykónyi (1,144)
- Nagyszékely (401)
- Nagyszokoly (910)
- Ozora (1,620)
- Pári (631)
- Pincehely (2,288)
- Regöly (1,175)
- **Simontornya** (4,128)
- Szakadát (227)
- Szakály (1,387)
- Szárazd (234)
- **Tamási** (8,345) – district seat
- Tolnanémedi (1,052)
- Udvari (357)
- Újireg (279)
- Varsád (360)

The bolded municipalities are cities, italics municipalities are large villages.

== See also ==
- List of cities and towns in Hungary
