= Balatonalmádi District =

Coordinates: 47.034389826203224°N 18.01361244502756°E

Balatonalmádi District Balatonalmádi járás
- District
- Coat of arms

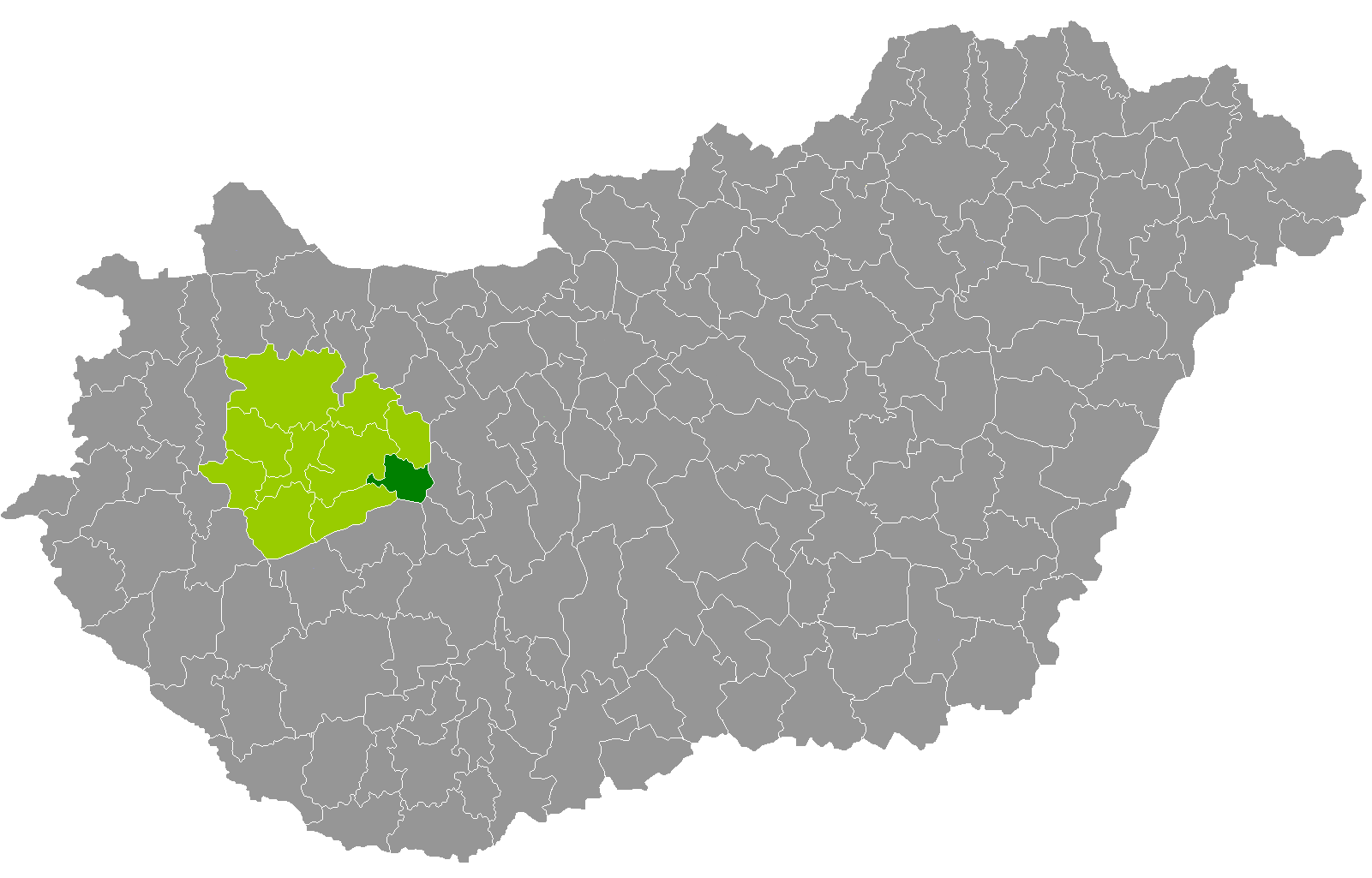
- Balatonalmádi District within Hungary and Veszprém County.
- Country: Hungary
- County: Veszprém
- District seat: Balatonalmádi

Area
  - Total: 239.75 km^{2} (92.57 sq mi)
  - Rank: 10th in Veszprém

Population (2011 census)
  - Total: 24,330
  - Rank: 6th in Veszprém
  - Density: 101/km^{2} (260/sq mi)

Balatonalmádi (Hungarian: Balatonalmádi járás) is a district in south-eastern part of Veszprém County. Balatonalmádi is also the name of the town where the district seat is found. The district is located in the Central Transdanubia Statistical Region.

== Geography ==
Balatonalmádi District borders with Várpalota District to the north, Székesfehérvár District (Fejér County) to the east, Enying District (Fejér County) and Siófok District (Somogy County) to the south, Balatonfüred District and Veszprém District to the west. The number of the inhabited places in Balatonalmádi District is 11.

== Municipalities ==
The district has 3 towns and 8 villages. (ordered by population, as of 1 January 2013)

- Balatonakarattya
- **Balatonalmádi** (8,506) – district seat
- Balatonfőkajár (1,339)
- **Balatonfűzfő** (4,248)
- **Balatonkenese** (3,334)
- Csajág (834)
- Felsőörs (1,591)
- Királyszentistván (471)
- Küngös (503)
- Litér (2,127)
- Papkeszi (1,526)

The bolded municipalities are cities.

== See also ==
- List of cities and towns in Hungary
