= Dunaszentgyörgy =

- Coat of arms

- Location of Dunaszentgyörgy in Hungary
- Coordinates: 46°32′N 18°50′E
- Country: Hungary
- Region: Southern Transdanubia
- County: Tolna
- District: Paks

Area
  - Total: 37.63 km^{2} (14.53 sq mi)

Population (1 January 2008)
  - Total: 2,585
  - Density: 68.70/km^{2} (177.9/sq mi)
- Time zone: UTC+1 (CET)
  - Summer (DST): UTC+2 (CEST)
- Postal code: 7135
- Area code: +36 75
- KSH code: 09539
- Website: www.dunaszentgyorgy.hu

Dunaszentgyörgy is a village in Tolna County, Hungary.
