= Pári =

- Location of Tolna county in Hungary

- Location of Pári
- Coordinates: 46.57972°N 18.25778°E
- Country: Hungary
- County: Tolna

Area
  - Total: 13.06 km^{2} (5.04 sq mi)

Population (2010)
  - Total: 657
  - Density: 50.31/km^{2} (130.3/sq mi)
- Time zone: UTC+1 (CET)
  - Summer (DST): UTC+2 (CEST)
- Postal code: 7091
- Area code: 74

Pári is a village in Tolna county, Hungary. It is independent again from 2006 (previously it belonged to the municipality of Tamási).

The former railway section of line 49 between Pári and Tamási were converted into a bicycle trail in 2010.
