= Veszprém District =

Veszprém District Veszprémi járás
- Districts of Hungary
- Coat of arms

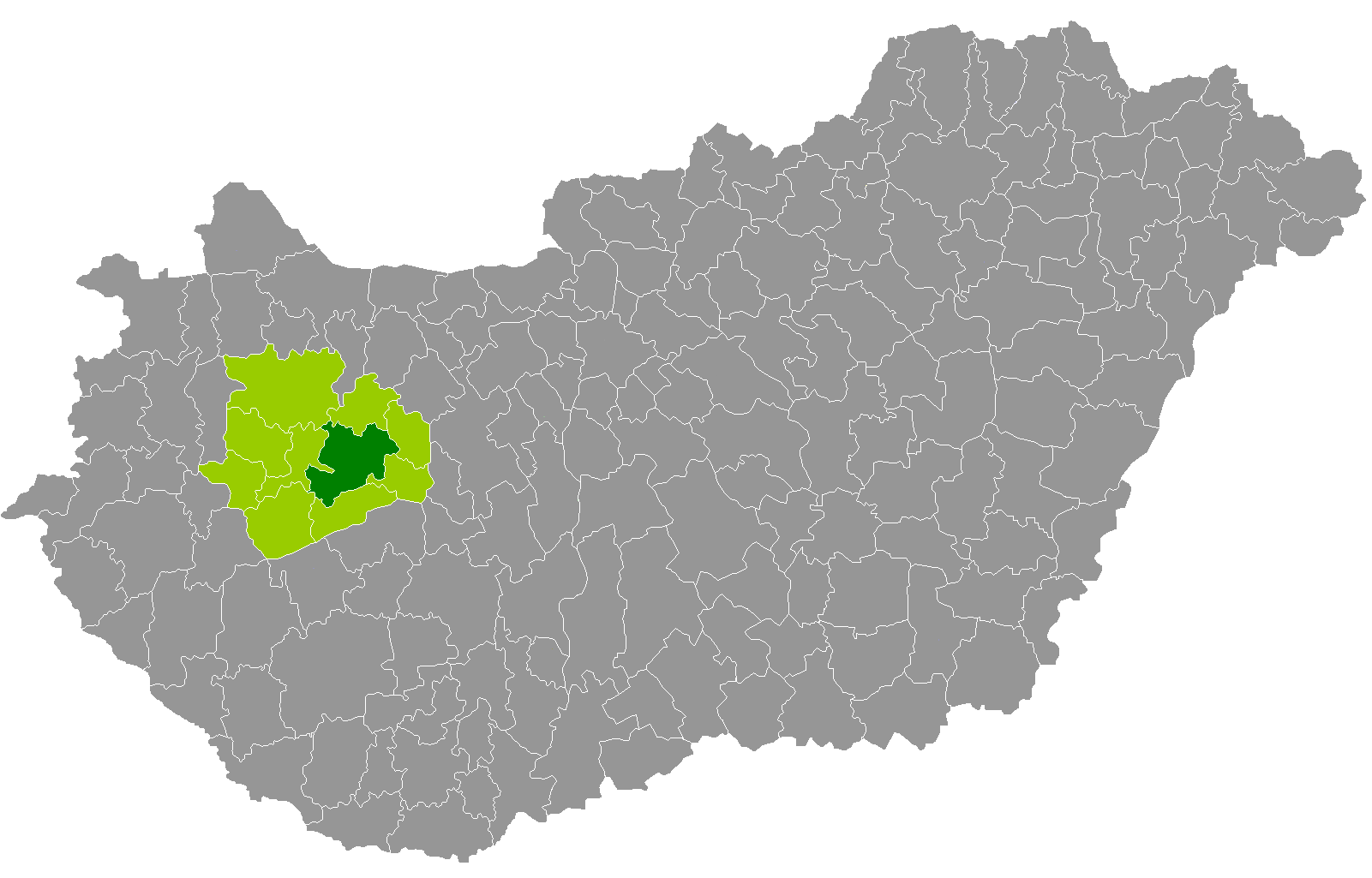
- Veszprém District within Hungary and Veszprém County.
- Coordinates: 47.10°N 17.91°E
- Country: Hungary
- County: Veszprém
- District seat: Veszprém (town)

Area
  - Total: 629.61 km^{2} (243.09 sq mi)
  - Rank: 2nd in Veszprém

Population (2011 census)
  - Total: 83,288
  - Rank: 1st in Veszprém
  - Density: 132/km^{2} (340/sq mi)

Veszprém (Hungarian: Veszprémi járás) is a district in central-eastern part of Veszprém County. Veszprém is also the name of the town where the district seat is found. The district is located in the Central Transdanubia Statistical Region.

== Geography ==
Veszprém District borders with Zirc District to the north, Várpalota District and Balatonalmádi District to the east, Balatonfüred District to the south, Tapolca District, Ajka District and Pápa District to the west. The number of the inhabited places in Veszprém District is 19.

== Municipalities ==
The district has 1 urban county, 1 town and 17 villages. (ordered by population, as of 1 January 2013)

- Barnag (132)
- Bánd (665)
- Eplény (516)
- Hajmáskér (2,865)
- Hárskút (689)
- **Herend** (3,377)
- Hidegkút (417)
- Márkó (1,216)
- Mencshely (239)
- Nagyvázsony (1,760)
- Nemesvámos (2,627)
- Pula (195)
- Sóly (474)
- Szentgál (2,762)
- Szentkirályszabadja (1,920)
- Tótvázsony (1,297)
- **Veszprém** (60,876) – district and county seat
- Veszprémfajsz (243)
- Vöröstó (83)

The bolded municipalities are cities.

== See also ==
- List of cities and towns in Hungary
