= Várpalota District =

Várpalota District Várpalotai járás
- Districts of Hungary
- Coat of arms

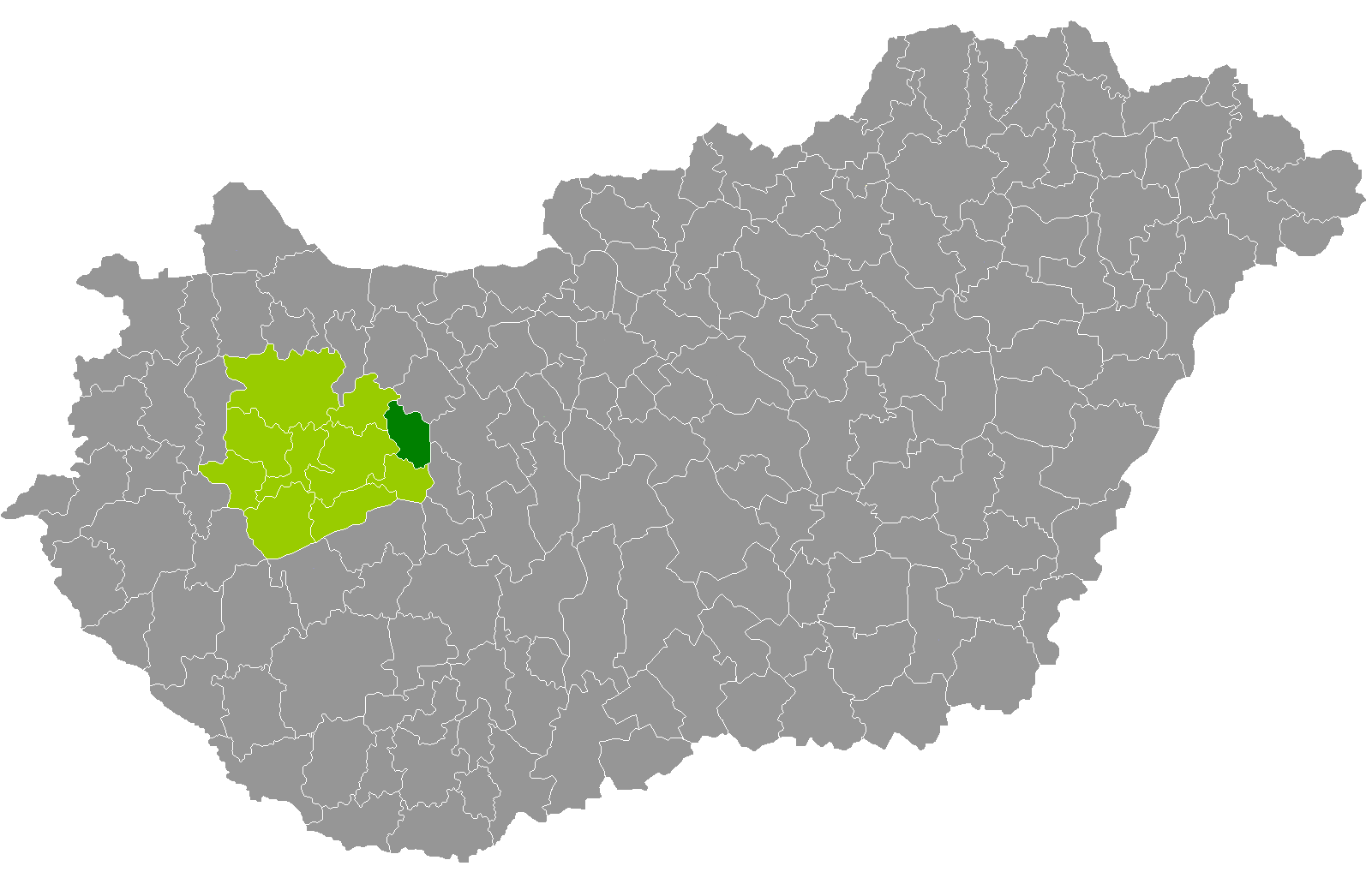
- Várpalota District within Hungary and Veszprém County.
- Coordinates: 47.1984°N 18.1409°E
- Country: Hungary
- County: Veszprém
- District seat: Várpalota

Area
  - Total: 294.28 km^{2} (113.62 sq mi)
  - Rank: 9th in Veszprém

Population (2011 census)
  - Total: 37,882
  - Rank: 4th in Veszprém
  - Density: 129/km^{2} (330/sq mi)

Várpalota (Hungarian: Várpalotai járás) is a district in eastern part of Veszprém County. Várpalota is also the name of the town where the district seat is found. The district is located in the Central Transdanubia Statistical Region.

== Geography ==
Várpalota District borders with Mór District (Fejér County) to the northeast, Székesfehérvár District (Fejér County) to the east, Balatonalmádi District to the south, Veszprém District to the west, Zirc District to the northwest. The number of the inhabited places in Várpalota District is 8.

== Municipalities ==
The district has 2 towns, 1 large village and 5 villages. (ordered by population, as of 1 January 2013)

- **Berhida** (5,917)
- Jásd (717)
- Öskü (2,230)
- Ősi (2,065)
- Pétfürdő (4,775)
- Tés (803)
- **Várpalota** (20,307) – district seat
- Vilonya (637)

The bolded municipalities are cities, italics municipality is large village.

== See also ==
- List of cities and towns in Hungary
