= Sümeg =

- Town
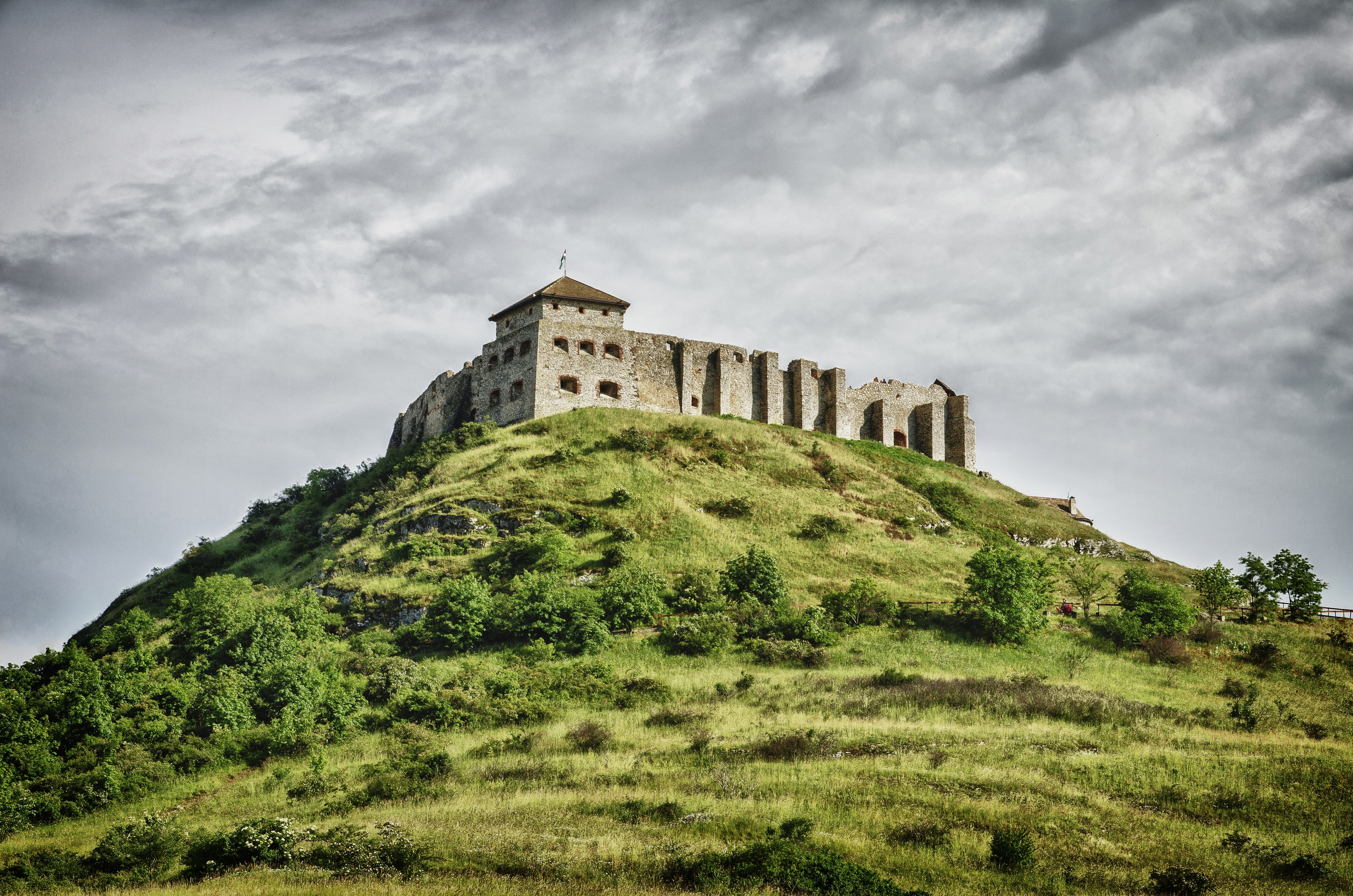
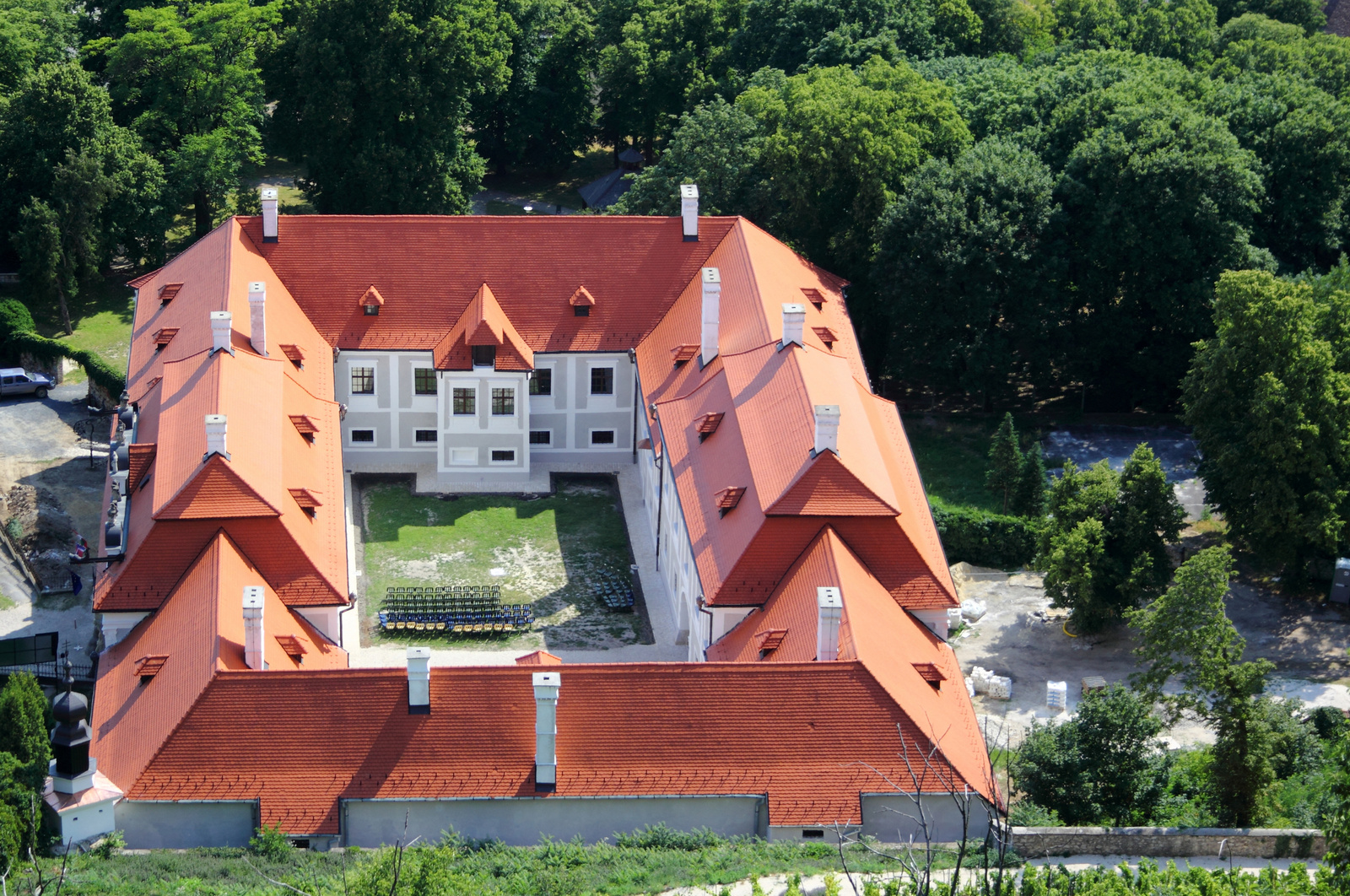
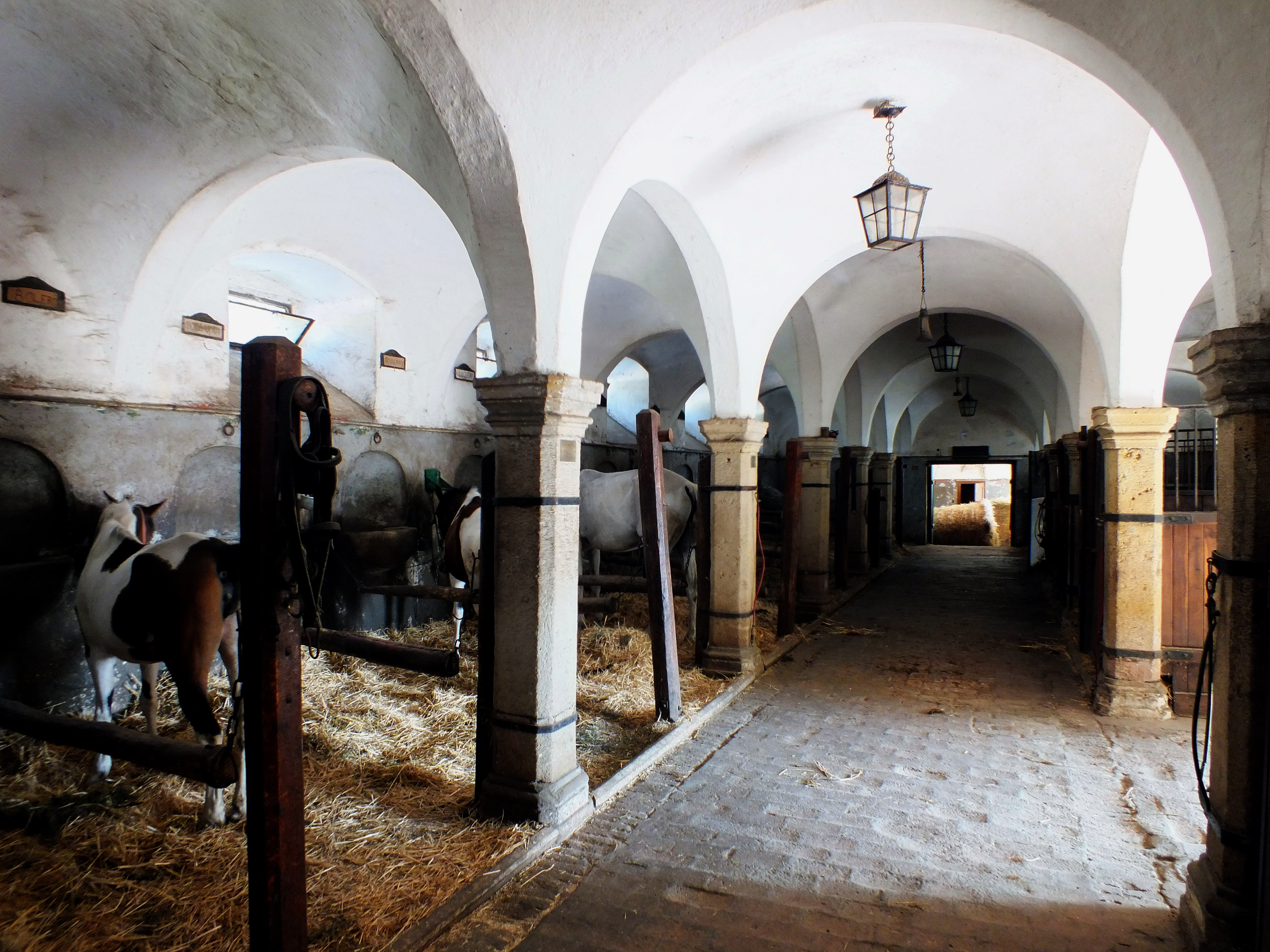

- Flag Coat of arms

- Location of Sümeg
- Coordinates: 46.97870°N 17.28206°E
- Country: Hungary
- County: Veszprém
- District: Sümeg

Area
  - Total: 64.13 km^{2} (24.76 sq mi)

Population (2004)
  - Total: 6,758
  - Density: 105.37/km^{2} (272.9/sq mi)
- Time zone: UTC+1 (CET)
  - Summer (DST): UTC+2 (CEST)
- Postal code: 8330
- Area code: (+36) 87
- Website: www.sumeg.hu

Sümeg (German: Schimeck) is a town in Veszprém county, Hungary. Sümeg is mostly known for Sümeg Castle. It is 20 kilometres (12 miles) north of Lake Balaton.

== Twin towns – sister cities ==
Sümeg is twinned with:

- Aichtal, Germany
- Sovata, Romania
- Tapolca, Hungary
- Vobarno, Italy
