= Kincsesbánya =

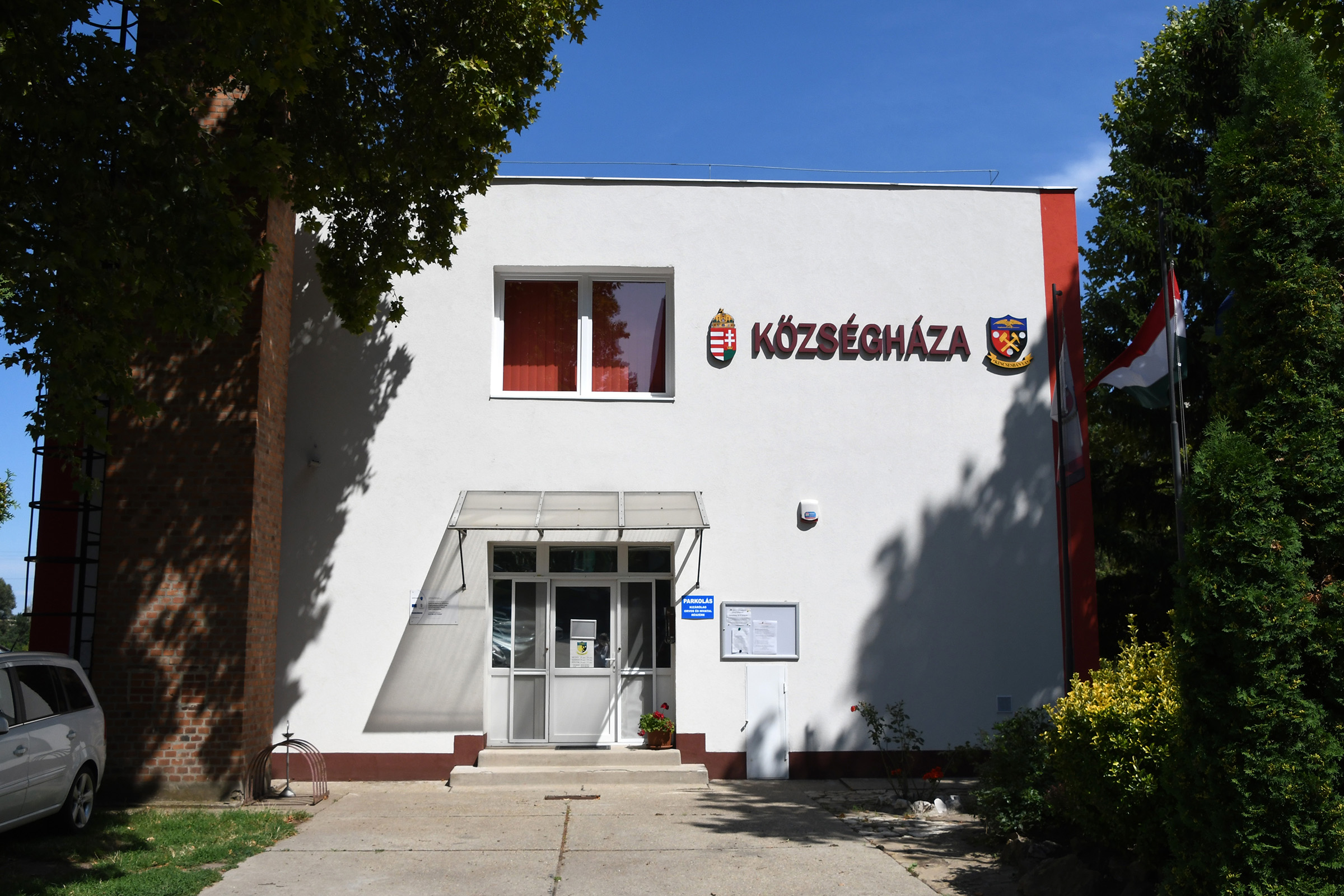
- Village hall

- Location of Kincsesbánya in Hungary
- Coordinates: 47.2645°N 18.2758°E
- Country: Hungary
- Region: Central Transdanubia
- County: Fejér

Area
  - Total: 10.87 km^{2} (4.20 sq mi)

Population (2012)
  - Total: 1,526
  - Density: 140.4/km^{2} (363.6/sq mi)
- Time zone: UTC+1 (CET)
  - Summer (DST): UTC+2 (CEST)
- Postal code: 8044
- Area code: +36 22
- Website: http://kincsesbanya.hu/

Kincsesbánya is a village in Fejér County, Hungary.
