= Kaposszekcső =

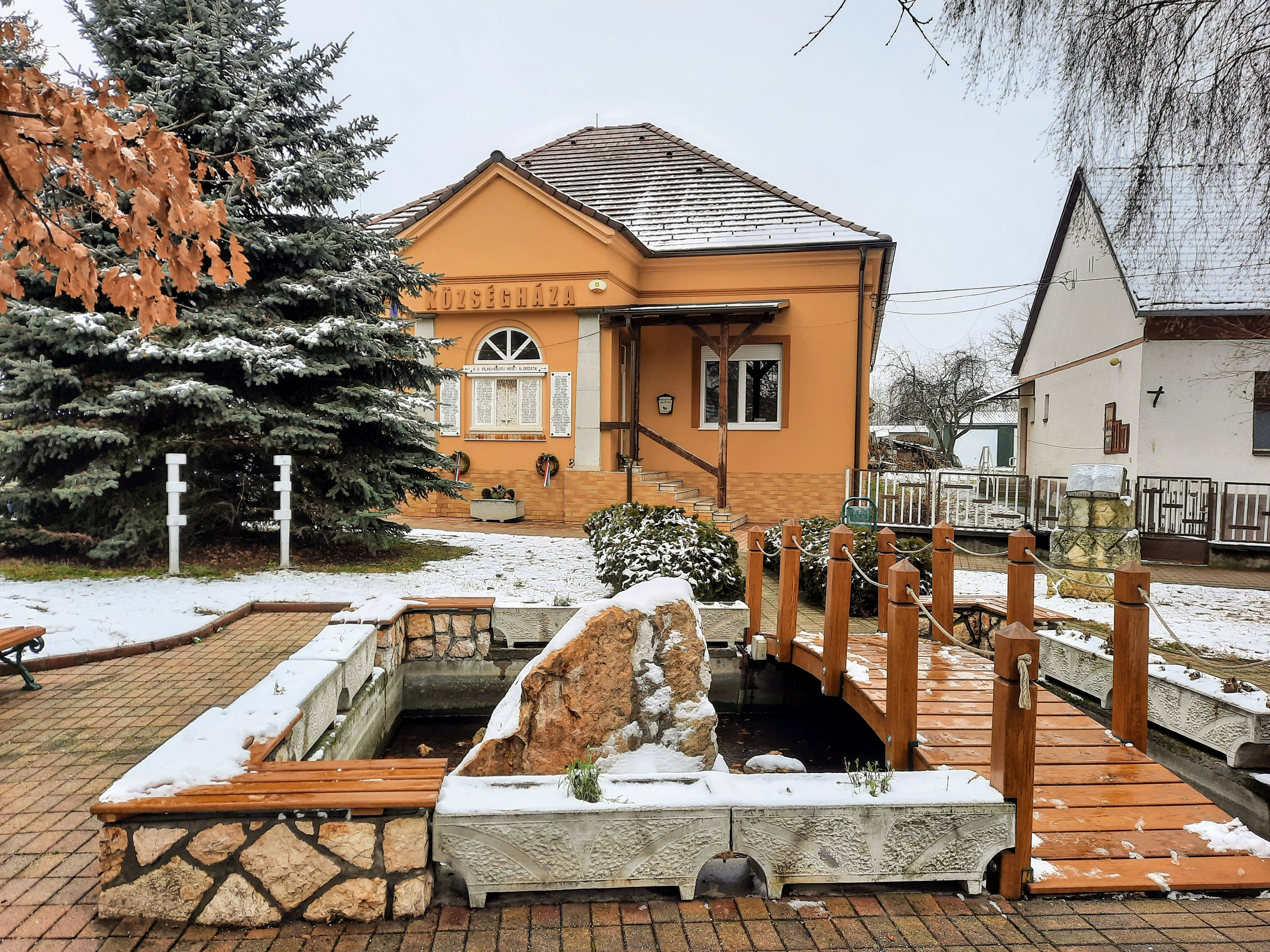
- Village hall

- Coat of arms

- Location within Hungary
- Coordinates: 46°19′43″N 18°07′43″E
- Country: Hungary
- County: Tolna

Area
  - Total: 15.6 km^{2} (6.0 sq mi)

Population (2025)
  - Total: 1,514
  - Density: 97.1/km^{2} (251/sq mi)
- Time zone: UTC+1 (CET)
  - Summer (DST): UTC+2 (CEST)
- Postal code: 7200 7361
- Area code: 74
- Website: www.kaposszekcso.hu

Kaposszekcső is a village in Tolna county, Hungary.
