= Paks District =

Paks District Paksi járás
- Districts of Hungary
- Coat of arms

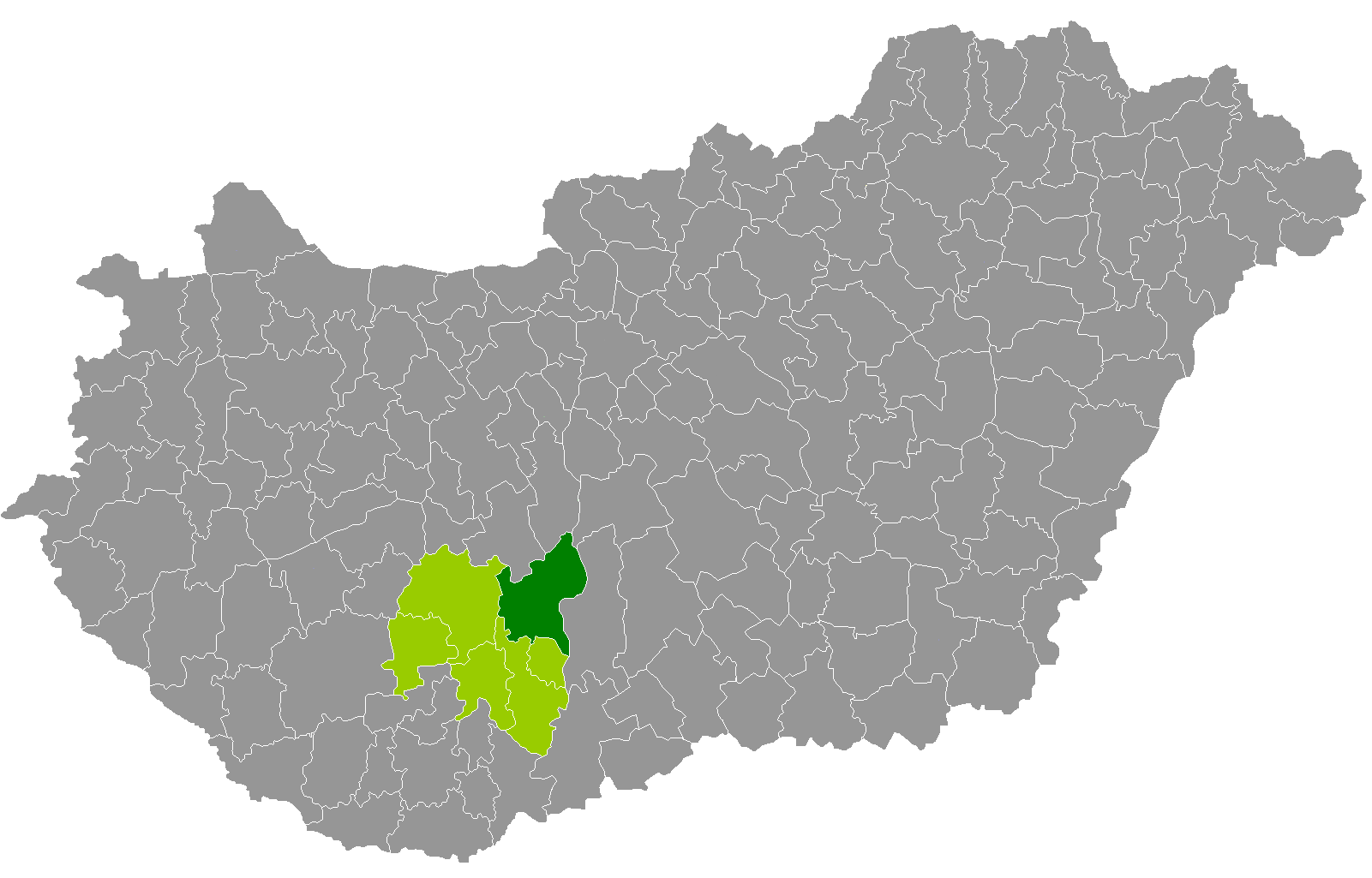
- Paks District within Hungary and Tolna County.
- Coordinates: 46.6084°N 18.8491°E
- Country: Hungary
- County: Tolna
- District seat: Paks

Area
  - Total: 836.00 km^{2} (322.78 sq mi)
  - Rank: 2nd in Tolna

Population (2011 census)
  - Total: 49,433
  - Rank: 2nd in Tolna
  - Density: 59/km^{2} (150/sq mi)

Paks (Hungarian: Paksi járás) is a district in north-eastern part of Tolna County. Paks is also the name of the town where the district seat is found. The district is located in the Southern Transdanubia Statistical Region.

== Geography ==
Paks District borders with Sárbogárd District and Dunaújváros District (Fejér County) to the north, Kunszentmiklós District and Kalocsa District (Bács-Kiskun County) to the east, Tolna District and Szekszárd District to the south, Tamási District to the west. The number of the inhabited places in Paks District is 15.

== Municipalities ==
The district has 2 towns, 1 large village and 12 villages. (ordered by population, as of 1 January 2013)

- Bikács (466)
- Bölcske (2,787)
- **Dunaföldvár** (8,722)
- Dunaszentgyörgy (2,555)
- Gerjen (1,203)
- Györköny (992)
- Kajdacs (1,262)
- Madocsa (1,935)
- Nagydorog (2,591)
- Németkér (1,715)
- **Paks** (19,481) – district seat
- Pálfa (1,572)
- Pusztahencse (955)
- Sárszentlőrinc (1,078)
- Tengelic (2,296)

The bolded municipalities are cities, italics municipality is large village.

== See also ==
- List of cities and towns in Hungary
