= Ipolydamásd =

- Flag Coat of arms

- Location of Ipolydamásd in Hungary
- Coordinates: 47.83795°N 18.83037°E
- Country: Hungary
- Region: Central Hungary
- County: Pest
- Subregion: Szobi
- Rank: Village

Government
  - Mayor: Rományik Ferenc

Area
  - Total: 11.60 km^{2} (4.48 sq mi)

Population (1 January 2008)
  - Total: 353
  - Density: 30.4/km^{2} (78.8/sq mi)
- Time zone: UTC+1 (CET)
  - Summer (DST): UTC+2 (CEST)
- Postal code: 2631
- Area code: +36 27
- KSH code: 28097
- Website: www.ipolydamasd.hu

Ipolydamásd is a village in Pest county, Hungary. Ipolydamásd name comes from river Ipoly.
