= Várgesztes =

Várgesztes _{Gestitz}
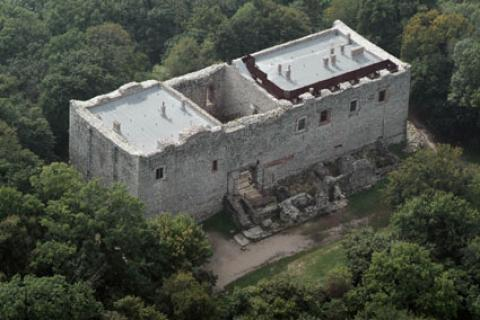
- Castle of Várgesztes

- Location of Várgesztes
- Coordinates: 47.47527°N 18.39732°E
- Country: Hungary
- County: Komárom-Esztergom

Area
  - Total: 12.04 km^{2} (4.65 sq mi)

Population (2004)
  - Total: 520
  - Density: 43.18/km^{2} (111.8/sq mi)
- Time zone: UTC+1 (CET)
  - Summer (DST): UTC+2 (CEST)
- Postal code: 2824
- Area code: 34
- Website: www.gesztes.hu

Várgesztes (German: Gestitz) is a village in Komárom-Esztergom county, Hungary.

== History ==
=== Várgesztes in the Roman era ===
The presence of the Romans here dates back to AD 1–5. centuries. There are tangible memories of Várgestes from this age as well. Relics from the Roman era (carved stones, sarcophagus remains) were also found in the medieval castle. One of the earliest known monuments from the Roman period in Várgestes and its surroundings is the two altar stones, which are kept in the Székesfehérvár Museum and in the nearby parish.

In 2002, during the excavation of the Kuny Domonkos Museum (Tata) in the field north of the settlement, a detail of the late Roman settlement came to light with the excavation of Júlianna Kissné Cseh. During the excavation, the ruins of a pottery kiln and two kilns made of stone and edged bricks were found. The site of the latter two objects was used by Roman-era potters as a quarry and then as a garbage pit, thanks to which a large amount of ceramics, including yellowish-green and brown glazed jars, fragments of rubbing bowls and brick fragments were found. Based on the finds, the settlement dates back to the 4th century AD. It was also inhabited in the century.

The facilities built by the Romans in addition to the settlement roads, the watchtowers along the roads - these also served to communicate the news of the empire, and there were several of them in the area. Many veterans settled far from the village's roads - but as close as possible to them. That is why the finds of sarcophagus tombstones in the area are very rich.

=== The ravages of the Tatars ===
The devastation of the Tatars was significant only in areas not protected by forests. Thus, the ancient "Keztus" was also able to escape the destruction of the Tatars. The Tatar invasion destroyed 1/3 of the surrounding settlements. The XII-XIII. we know several certified data from sz. We know that this part of our country belonged to the most densely populated areas of the country. All of this was possible because farming had finally gained ground, feudal relations were established, the royal seat - Fehérvár-Esztergom - was close by, and traffic conditions were good. Several important routes passed through Vértes here and nearby.

=== German settlers arrive in Gesztes ===
Count József Eszterházy is associated with the settlements carried out in the Gesztes and Tata manors. In the case of these, the directive was that the manor should acquire a sufficient number of workers, and that the settlers should mainly be of the Catholic religion. The installation did not take place at the same time, even in one and the same locality. The main installation is approx. It took place between 1733 and 1745. The settlers of Gestes arrived in 1735 from Franken and Alsace. At that time, the village of FA was still called Puszta-gestes. In the 1770s, the newcomers came from the Bavarian-speaking area. Unfortunately, there are many discrepancies both in the diplomas and in the birth certificates, so the origin is disputed in most cases.

During the visitation of Cosma in 1747, the visitor personally visited Gesztes. During his visit, he found the following: "An elderly noblewoman lives here with her relatives and servants, there is no church, no chapel, no bell and no cemetery in the locality, but their dead are taken to Kozma. Everyone here is Catholic. The parish priest is paid HUF 6 per year in cash and the resulting stole, nothing else. On Sundays and holidays, they don't go to the parish for worship /although the parish priest told them/, but to the Kamanduli fathers in Majka, because it's closer." The first chapel was built in 1796. Through the intercession of Bezerédi, the chief administrator of the manor, they received the necessary materials for construction free of charge.

=== Gesztes during the Turkish subjugation ===
In 1526, the Turks were already in the territory of the country. After the Hungarian defeat at Mohács, the country was open to them, and until they encountered a significant enemy marching towards Buda, they could plunder the villages and castles in their way as they pleased. In 1541, he captured Buda by trick and occupied the central area of the country, the country was divided into three parts. In this period, the greatest trials are experienced by the ends. The borders primarily belonged to the border of Royal Hungary and the Turkish Subjugation. These areas had to suffer from time to time the changes of owners, the cruelty and destruction of the passing armies, the driving away of their animals and the regular taxation, which the Turks and the Hungarians often collected at the same time.

The village belonged to the end of this miserable fate, but even then Gesztes could not be looted or robbed, the castle provided protection to the inhabitants. However, in 1543, when Sultan Suleiman set out to conquer Transdanubia, he occupied Esztergom, and at the same time, Tata and Gesztes came into his possession. In 1556, Count Slam's Christian armies successfully recaptured Tata Castle. The Turkish guard of Gesztes castle gave up the castle on this news and fled to Esztergom, so Count Slam was able to retake Gesztes castle without any trouble.

In 1558, the armies of Hamza bey occupied the castle of Tata and then turned towards Gesztes. At that time, the castle was defended by 36 Hungarian warriors, so taking the castle was not a problem for the bey's army. In 1559, the castle was again in Hungarian hands, and it remained there until 1566. At that time, the Turkish siege was stopped again

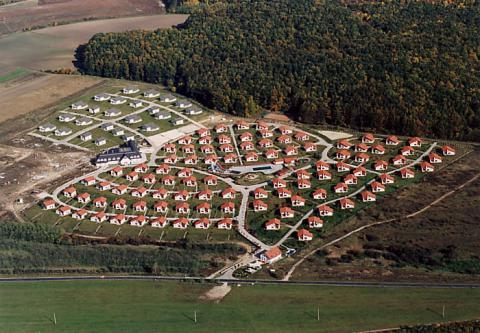
Aerial photography of Villapark Várgesztes holiday resort
