= Nagylóc =

Village in Nógrád County, Hungary

Coordinates: 48°01′58″N 19°34′33″E

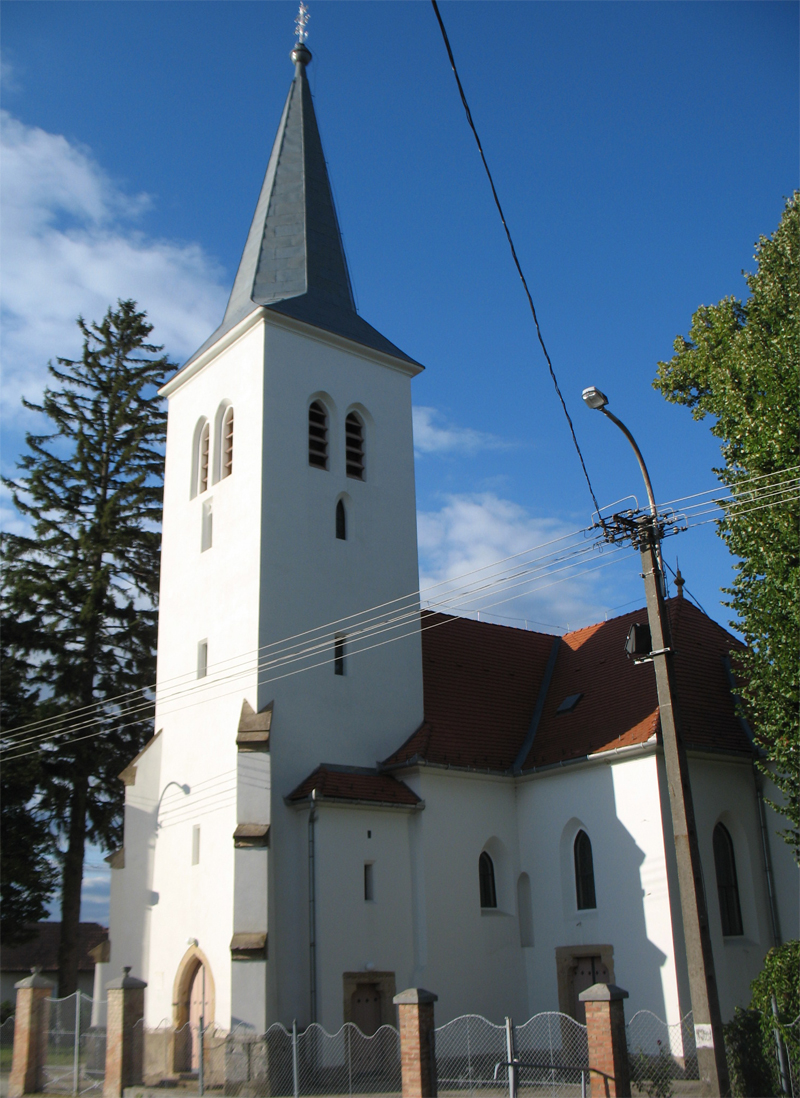

Nagylóc is a village in Nógrád County, Hungary with 1,398 inhabitants (2025).
