= Sály =

Coordinates: 47°57′N 20°40′E

- Village
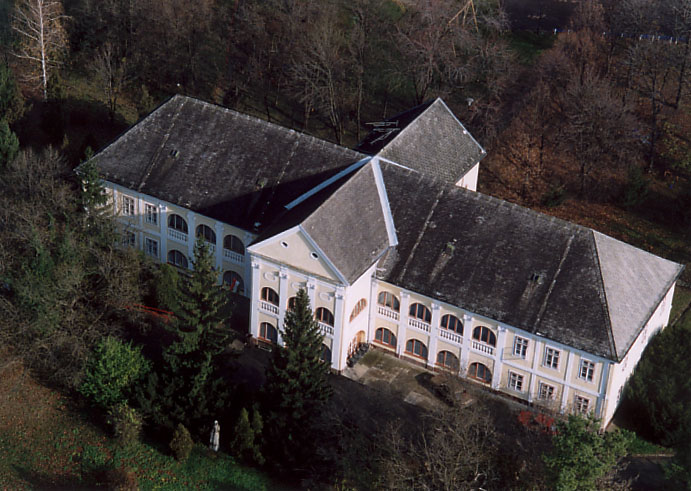
- Sály - Palace
- Interactive map of Sály
- Country: Hungary
- Regions: Northern Hungary
- County: Borsod-Abaúj-Zemplén County

Population (2025)
  - Total: 1,496
- Time zone: UTC+1 (CET)
  - Summer (DST): UTC+2 (CEST)
- Website: www.saly.hu

Sály is a village in Borsod-Abaúj-Zemplén County in northeastern Hungary.
