= Bánd =

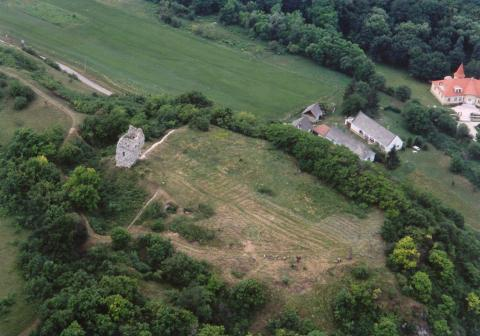

- Flag Coat of arms

- Location of Bánd in Hungary
- Coordinates: 47.1205°N 17.7825°E
- Country: Hungary
- Region: Central Transdanubia
- County: Veszprém

Area
  - Total: 9.84 km^{2} (3.80 sq mi)

Population (2012)
  - Total: 673
  - Density: 68.4/km^{2} (177/sq mi)
- Time zone: UTC+1 (CET)
  - Summer (DST): UTC+2 (CEST)
- Postal code: 8443
- Area code: +36 88
- Website: http://www.band.hu/

Bánd is a village in Veszprém county, Hungary.
