= Sáska =

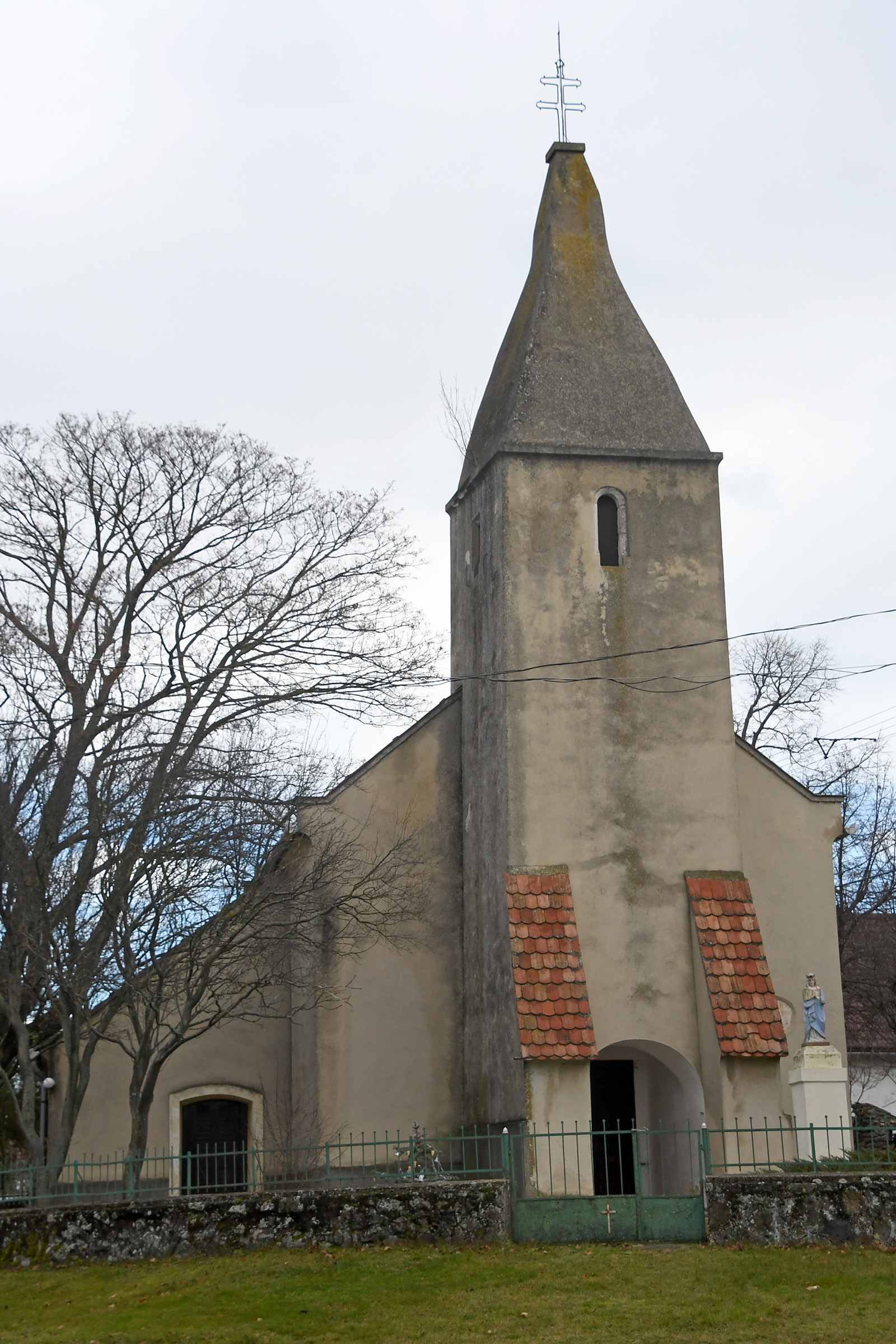
- Árpád-era Roman Catholic church in Sáska

- Flag Coat of arms

- Location of Veszprém county in Hungary

- Location of Sáska
- Coordinates: 46.93591°N 17.47856°E
- Country: Hungary
- County: Veszprém

Government
  - Mayor: Horváth Bence (Ind.)

Area
  - Total: 37.48 km^{2} (14.47 sq mi)

Population (2022)
  - Total: 273
  - Density: 7.28/km^{2} (18.9/sq mi)
- Time zone: UTC+1 (CET)
  - Summer (DST): UTC+2 (CEST)
- Postal code: 8308
- Area code: 87
- Website: www.saska.hu

Sáska is a village in Veszprém county, Hungary.

== Local government ==
=== Mayors ===
- 1990–1994: Ferenc Hoffman (independent)
- 1994–1998: Nándor Kovács (independent)
- 1998–2002: Jenő Holczbauer (independent)
- 2002–2006: Nándor Kovács (independent)
- 2006–2010: Nándor Kovács (independent)
- 2010–2014: János Nándor Kovács (independent)
- 2014–2019: János Nándor Kovács (independent)
- 2019–2024: Bence Horváth (independent)
- 2024–present: Bence Horváth (independent)
