= Zalaszegvár =

- Location of Veszprém county in Hungary

- Location of Zalaszegvár
- Coordinates: 47.09916°N 17.22392°E
- Country: Hungary
- County: Veszprém

Area
  - Total: 6.84 km^{2} (2.64 sq mi)

Population (2004)
  - Total: 140
  - Density: 20.46/km^{2} (53.0/sq mi)
- Time zone: UTC+1 (CET)
  - Summer (DST): UTC+2 (CEST)
- Postal code: 8476
- Area code: 87

Zalaszegvár is a village in Veszprém county, Hungary.

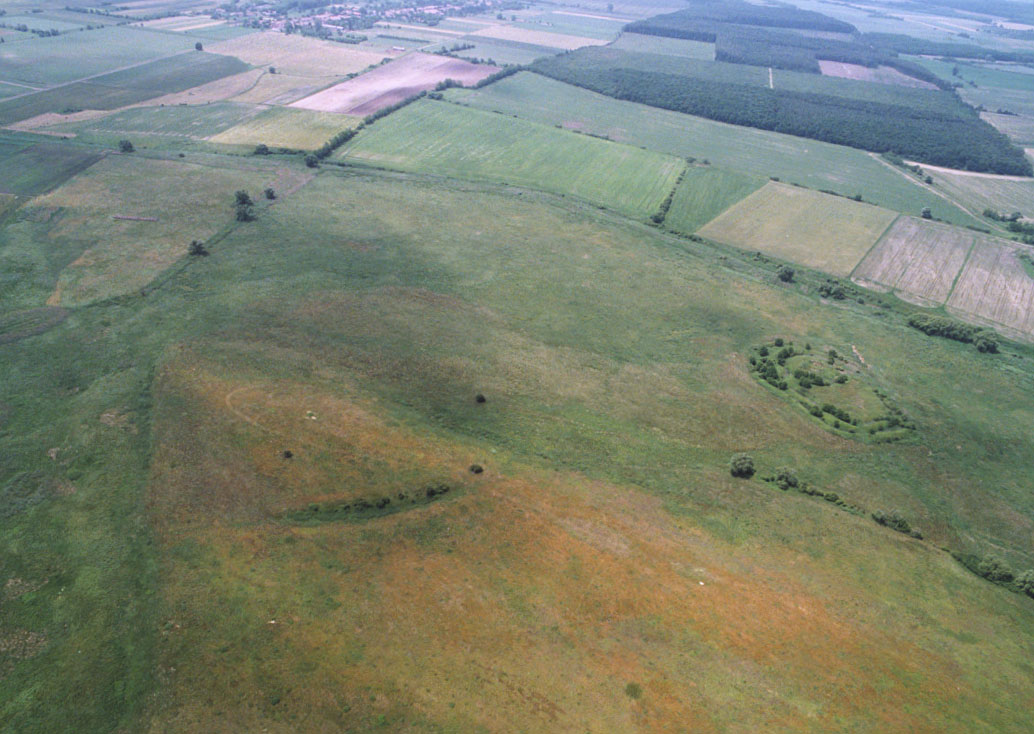
Zalaszegvár - nature from a bird's eye view
