= Hegyesd =

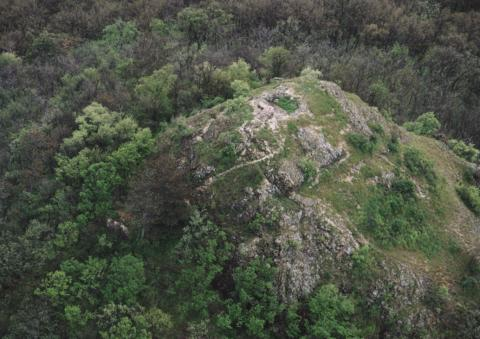
- Hegyesd, ruins from above

- Flag Coat of arms

- Location of Veszprém county in Hungary

- Location of Hegyesd
- Coordinates: 46.91596°N 17.52075°E
- Country: Hungary
- County: Veszprém

Area
  - Total: 11.05 km^{2} (4.27 sq mi)

Population (2025)
  - Total: 145
  - Density: 16.28/km^{2} (42.2/sq mi)
- Time zone: UTC+1 (CET)
  - Summer (DST): UTC+2 (CEST)
- Postal code: 8296
- Area code: 87

Hegyesd is a village in Veszprém county, Hungary. The population was 145 as of 2025.
