= Papkeszi =

- Flag Coat of arms

- Location of Papkeszi
- Coordinates: 47°04′55″N 18°04′54″E
- Country: Hungary
- County: Veszprém

Area
  - Total: 22.39 km^{2} (8.64 sq mi)

Population (2004)
  - Total: 1,636
  - Density: 73.06/km^{2} (189.2/sq mi)
- Time zone: UTC+1 (CET)
  - Summer (DST): UTC+2 (CEST)
- Postal code: 8183
- Area code: 88

Papkeszi is a village in Veszprém county, Hungary.
