= Gyulakeszi =

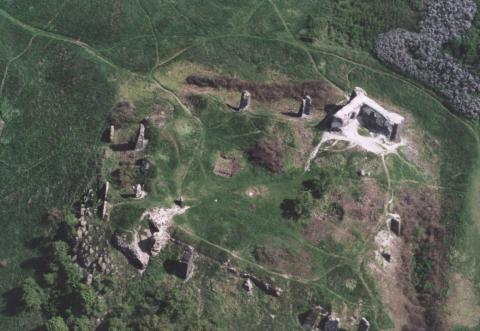
- Aerial photography of the Castle of Csobánc (13th century)

- Flag Coat of arms

- Location of Veszprém county in Hungary

- Location of Gyulakeszi
- Coordinates: 46.86652°N 17.48186°E
- Country: Hungary
- County: Veszprém

Area
  - Total: 9.67 km^{2} (3.73 sq mi)

Population (2004)
  - Total: 733
  - Density: 75.8/km^{2} (196/sq mi)
- Time zone: UTC+1 (CET)
  - Summer (DST): UTC+2 (CEST)
- Postal code: 8286
- Area code: 87

Gyulakeszi is a village in Veszprém county, Hungary.
