= Jásd =

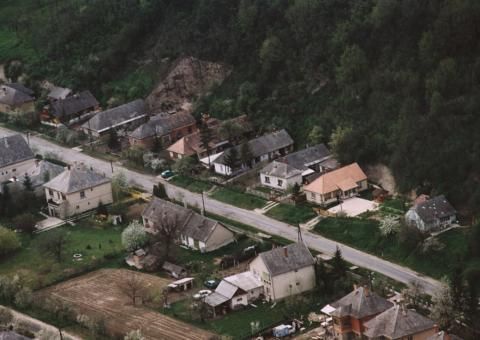

- Flag Coat of arms

- Location of Veszprém county in Hungary

- Location of Jásd
- Coordinates: 47.28709°N 18.0251°E
- Country: Hungary
- County: Veszprém

Area
  - Total: 10.28 km^{2} (3.97 sq mi)

Population (2004)
  - Total: 830
  - Density: 80.73/km^{2} (209.1/sq mi)
- Time zone: UTC+1 (CET)
  - Summer (DST): UTC+2 (CEST)
- Postal code: 8424
- Area code: 88

Jásd is a village in Veszprém county, Hungary.
