= Csabrendek =

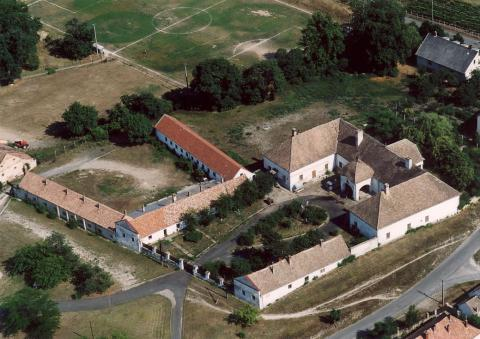

- Flag Coat of arms

- Location of Csabrendek in Hungary
- Coordinates: 47.0137°N 17.2932°E
- Country: Hungary
- Region: Central Transdanubia
- County: Veszprém

Government
  - Mayor: Turcsi József

Area
  - Total: 44.94 km^{2} (17.35 sq mi)

Population (2011)
  - Total: 2,973
  - Density: 66.15/km^{2} (171.3/sq mi)
- Time zone: UTC+1 (CET)
  - Summer (DST): UTC+2 (CEST)
- Postal code: 8474
- Area code: +36 87
- Website: http://csabrendek.hu/

Csabrendek is a village in Veszprém county, Hungary.
