= Tamási =

- Town
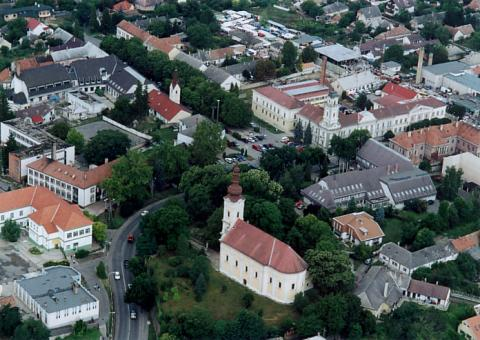
- Tamási from bird's eye view

- Flag Coat of arms

- Location of Tolna county in Hungary

- Location of Tamási
- Coordinates: 46.62319°N 18.30474°E
- Country: Hungary
- County: Tolna
- District: Tamási

Area
  - Total: 125.01 km^{2} (48.27 sq mi)

Population (2004)
  - Total: 9,626
  - Density: 77/km^{2} (200/sq mi)
- Time zone: UTC+1 (CET)
  - Summer (DST): UTC+2 (CEST)
- Postal code: 7090
- Area code: (+36) 74
- Website: www.tamasi.hu

Tamási is a town in Tolna County, Hungary, and is located just 30 kilometers east of Lake Balaton. Tamási is named after St. Thomas and has a population of approximately 9,200 people.

Tamási was founded during the Roman era and primarily focused on agriculture. The town has a history of various conquerors including the Turks from 1525 to 1665 and the Austrians from 1848 to 1849. The town has many ruins and the town centre has a Catholic church that was built on the ruins of a temple built during the time of ancient Rome.

The Soviet Army controlled the town from 1945 to 1989 until the Soviet Eastern Bloc fell. Since the dissolution of the Soviet Union, Tamási and Hungary as a whole have been governed as a parliamentary democracy with free elections. Hungary is a member of both NATO and the European Union.

The famous Estherházy family once owned the Gyulaj Forest wild animal preserve, which is one of the area's notable natural features for hunting. During the Communist period of 1945–1989, party officials from Budapest organized large hunting parties and held feasts after the hunt, with photos of these events visible in the host lodge. The preserve covers 7.8 hectares and is home to one of the world's largest populations of fallow deer, called "dám vad. Waterbirds such as ferruginous ducks, Nyroca n. nyroca, and herons (Egretta), as well as predatory birds including hawks (Accipiter sp.), bald eagles, and Heliaeetus leucocephalus, are observed in the nearby Pacsmag Lake area. Bird-watching camps are organized here, led by specialized ornithologists.

== Notable current and former residents ==
- Andrea Osvárt, Hungarian actress
- Ernie Konnyu, retired American Congressman and California State Assemblyman of San Jose, CA USA was born here in 1937.

== Twin towns and sister cities ==
Tamási is twinned with:

- Blatná, Czech Republic
- Făgăraș, Romania
- Isernhagen, Germany
- Peacehaven, United Kingdom
- Piyterfolvo, Ukraine
- Stollberg, Germany
- Suchy Las, Poland
- Viekšniai, Lithuania
- Wurzen, Germany
