= Tolna County 2nd constituency =

Hungarian national legislative constituency

Tolna County 2nd constituency (Dombóvár)
- Constituency for the National Assembly
- Location of Tolna county 02 within Tolna county

- Location of Tolna county within Hungary
- County: Tolna
- Electorate: 60,069 (2018)
- Major settlements: Dombóvár

Current constituency
- Created: 2011
- Party: Tisza Party
- Member: Gábor Szijjártó
- Elected: 2026

The 2nd constituency of Tolna County (Hungarian: Tolna megyei 02. számú országgyűlési egyéni választókerület) is one of the single member constituencies of the National Assembly, the national legislature of Hungary. The constituency standard abbreviation: Tolna 02. OEVK.

Since 2026, it has been represented by Gábor Szijjártó of the Tisza Party.

== Geography ==
The 2nd constituency is located in south-western part of Tolna County.

=== List of municipalities ===
The constituency includes the following municipalities:

1. Alsónána
2. Aparhant
3. Attala
4. Bátaapáti
5. Bonyhád
6. Bonyhádvarasd
7. Cikó
8. Csibrák
9. Csikóstőttős
10. Dalmand
11. Diósberény
12. Dombóvár
13. Döbrököz
14. Dúzs
15. Értény
16. Felsőnána
17. Grábóc
18. Györe
19. Gyulaj
20. Harc
21. Hőgyész
22. Izmény
23. Jágónak
24. Kakasd
25. Kalaznó
26. Kapospula
27. Kaposszekcső
28. Kéty
29. Kisdorog
30. Kismányok
31. Kistormás
32. Kisvejke
33. Kocsola
34. Koppányszántó
35. Kölesd
36. Kurd
37. Lápafő
38. Lengyel
39. Mórágy
40. Mőcsény
41. Mucsfa
42. Mucsi
43. Murga
44. Nagykónyi
45. Nagymányok
46. Nagyvejke
47. Nak
48. Szakadát
49. Szakály
50. Szakcs
51. Szálka
52. Tevel
53. Újireg
54. Váralja
55. Várong
56. Varsád
57. Závod
58. Zomba

== Members ==
The constituency was first represented by Árpád János Potápi of the Fidesz from 2014, and he was re-elected in 2018.

Election	Member	Party	%
2014	Árpád János Potápi	Fidesz	
2018	Árpád János Potápi	Fidesz	
2022	Árpád János Potápi	Fidesz	62.4
2025 by election	Krisztina Csibi	Fidesz	63.7
2026	Gábor Szijjártó	TISZA	46.58
