= Bonyhád District =

Bonyhád District Bonyhádi járás
- Districts of Hungary
- Coat of arms

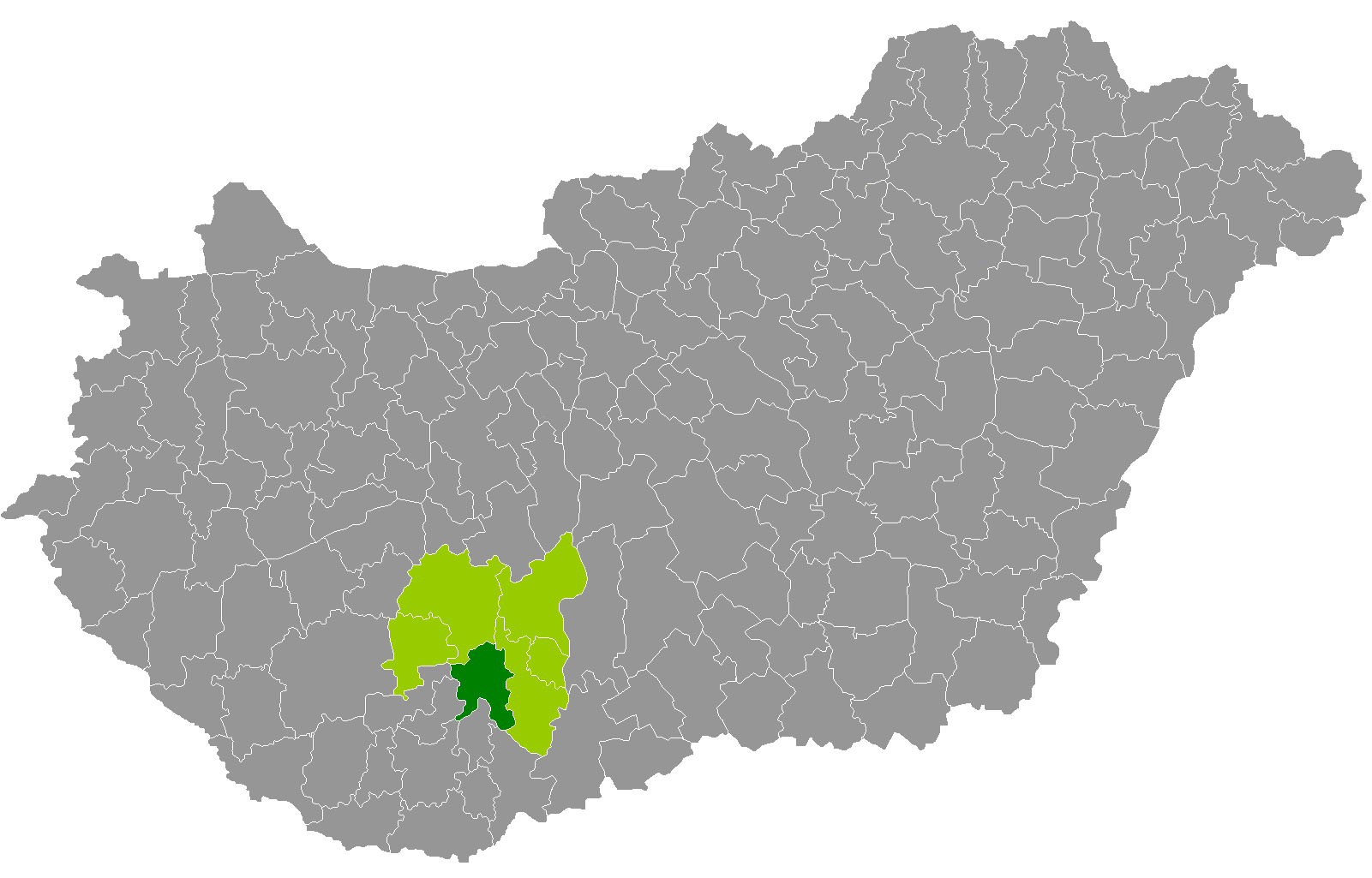
- Bonyhád District within Hungary and Tolna County.
- Coordinates: 46.30°N 18.53°E
- Country: Hungary
- County: Tolna
- District seat: Bonyhád

Area
  - Total: 476.77 km^{2} (184.08 sq mi)
  - Rank: 5th in Tolna

Population (2011 census)
  - Total: 31,567
  - Rank: 5th in Tolna
  - Density: 66/km^{2} (170/sq mi)

Bonyhád (Hungarian: Bonyhádi járás) is a district in southern part of Tolna County. Bonyhád is also the name of the town where the district seat is found. The district is located in the Southern Transdanubia Statistical Region.

== Geography ==
Bonyhád District borders with Tamási District to the north, Szekszárd District to the east, Mohács District, Pécsvárad District and Pécs District (Baranya County) to the south, Komló District and Hegyhát District (Baranya County) to the west. The number of the inhabited places in Bonyhád District is 25.

== Municipalities ==
The district has 2 towns and 23 villages. (ordered by population, as of 1 January 2013)

- Aparhant (1,038)
- Bátaapáti (411)
- **Bonyhád** (13,758) – district seat
- Bonyhádvarasd (434)
- Cikó (861)
- Felsőnána (609)
- Grábóc (180)
- Györe (670)
- Izmény (491)
- Kakasd (1,658)
- Kéty (719)
- Kisdorog (773)
- Kismányok (332)
- Kisvejke (393)
- Lengyel (539)
- Mórágy (773)
- Mőcsény (386)
- Mucsfa (374)
- Murga (67)
- **Nagymányok** (2,289)
- Nagyvejke (169)
- Tevel (1,419)
- Váralja (883)
- Závod (287)
- Zomba (2,069)

The bolded municipalities are cities.

== See also ==
- List of cities and towns in Hungary
