= List of twin towns and sister cities in Romania =

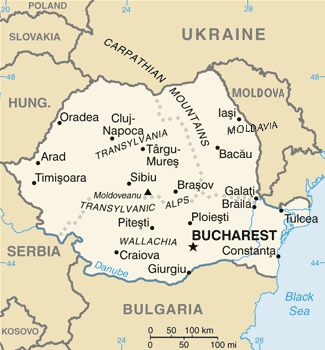
Map of Romania

This is a list of municipalities in Romania which have standing links to local communities in other countries known as "town twinning" (usually in Europe) or "sister cities" (usually in the rest of the world).

== A ==
Aiud

- Cherepovets, Russia
- Cusset, France
- Dingelstädt, Germany
- Gyomaendrőd, Hungary
- Megara, Greece
- Ponte de Sor, Portugal
- Siklós, Hungary
- Soltvadkert, Hungary

Alba Iulia

- Aigio, Greece
- Alcalá de Henares, Spain
- Alessandria, Italy
- Arnsberg, Germany
- Biograd na Moru, Croatia
- Cetinje, Montenegro
- Chișinău, Moldova
- Düzce, Turkey
- Lanzhou, China
- Nof HaGalil, Israel
- Sliven, Bulgaria
- Székesfehérvár, Hungary
- Varese, Italy
- Viadana, Italy

Aleșd

- Stará Ľubovňa, Slovakia

Arad

- Atlit (Hof HaCarmel), Israel
- Bethlehem, Palestine
- Fushun, China
- Givatayim, Israel
- Gyula, Hungary
- Heist-op-den-Berg, Belgium
- Hegyvidék (Budapest), Hungary
- Hódmezővásárhely, Hungary
- Pécs, Hungary
- Prague 5 (Prague), Czech Republic
- Rîșcani (Chișinău), Moldova
- Zrenjanin, Serbia

== B ==
Bacău

- Blaj, Romania
- Petah Tikva, Israel

Baia Mare

- Bielsko-Biała, Poland
- Combs-la-Ville, France
- Hódmezővásárhely, Hungary
- Hollywood, United States
- Ivano-Frankivsk, Ukraine
- Kitwe, Zambia
- Nyíregyháza, Hungary
- Serino, Italy
- Solotvyno, Ukraine
- Stepanakert, Azerbaijan
- Szolnok, Hungary
- Wels, Austria

Bălan

- Kőbánya (Budapest), Hungary

Bălăușeri

- Aalsmeer, Netherlands
- Aldebrő, Hungary
- Fót, Hungary
- Kisbárapáti, Hungary
- Somogyvár, Hungary
- Tápiószentmárton, Hungary

Baraolt

- Bucine, Italy
- Dabas, Hungary
- Budafok-Tétény (Budapest), Hungary
- Sarkad, Hungary
- Štúrovo, Slovakia
- Szarvas, Hungary
- Zalaegerszeg, Hungary
- Zirc, Hungary

Bârlad

- Selçuklu, Turkey
- Vergèze, France

Beiuș

- Békéscsaba, Hungary
- Green, United States
- Komló, Hungary
- Méhkerék, Hungary

Bistrița

- L'Aquila, Italy
- Besançon, France
- Columbus, United States
- Herzogenrath, Germany
- Kisvárda, Hungary
- Rehovot, Israel
- Soroca, Moldova
- Ștefan Vodă, Moldova
- Ungheni, Moldova
- Wels, Austria
- Wiehl, Germany
- Zielona Góra, Poland

Blaj

- Allschwil, Switzerland
- Bacău, Romania
- Ceglédbercel, Hungary
- Durlești, Moldova
- Morlanwelz, Belgium
- Recanati, Italy

Bocșa

- Petrovac, Serbia
- La Valette-du-Var, France

Boldești-Scăeni

- Češinovo-Obleševo, North Macedonia
- Leova, Moldova
- Pavlikeni, Bulgaria

Borșa

- Rokiškis, Lithuania

Botiza

- Solotvyno, Ukraine

Botoșani

- Karaman, Turkey
- Laval, Canada

Brădești

- Andornaktálya, Hungary
- Szászvár, Hungary
- Tóalmás, Hungary

Bradu

- Rixensart, Belgium

Brăila

- Argostoli, Greece
- Beşiktaş, Turkey
- Calais, France
- Denizli, Turkey
- Katerini, Greece
- Nilüfer, Turkey
- Pleven, Bulgaria

Brașov

- Bijeljina, Bosnia and Herzegovina
- Cleveland, United States
- Győr, Hungary
- Holstebro, Denmark
- Linz, Austria
- Nuremberg, Germany
- Rishon LeZion, Israel
- Tampere, Finland
- Tours, France

Brețcu

- Hódmezővásárhely, Hungary
- Tótkomlós, Hungary

Brezoi

- La Bouilladisse, France

Bucharest

- Amman, Jordan
- Ankara, Turkey
- Atlanta, United States
- Athens, Greece
- Beijing, China
- Chișinău, Moldova
- Damascus, Syria
- Lagos, Nigeria
- Moscow, Russia
- Nicosia, Cyprus
- Pretoria, South Africa
- Sofia, Bulgaria
- (Georgia (country)) Tbilisi, Georgia

Buzău

- Agios Dimitrios, Greece
- Ialoveni District, Moldova
- Oudenaarde, Belgium
- Soroca, Moldova
- Strășeni, Moldova

== C ==
Calafat

- Almenno San Bartolomeo, Italy
- Kozloduy, Bulgaria

Călărași

- Bielsk Podlaski, Poland
- Călărași, Moldova
- Hengyang, China
- Raslavice, Slovakia
- Razgrad, Bulgaria
- Silistra, Bulgaria
- Svietlahorsk, Belarus
- Zaječar, Serbia

Câmpia Turzii

- Bayramiç, Turkey
- Kisbér, Hungary
- Mohács, Hungary
- Putten, Netherlands
- La Salvetat-Saint-Gilles, France
- San Fernando de Henares, Spain
- Siemianowice Śląskie, Poland

Câmpulung

- Dison, Belgium
- Popovo, Bulgaria
- Soissons, France

Câmpulung Moldovenesc

- Avezzano, Italy
- Dąbrowa Górnicza, Poland
- Karmiel, Israel

Caracal

- Białogard, Poland
- Cherven Bryag, Bulgaria
- Montana, Bulgaria

Carei

- Mátészalka, Hungary
- Nyírbátor, Hungary
- Orosháza, Hungary

Cârța

- Fertőrákos, Hungary
- Helvécia, Hungary
- Mernye, Hungary
- Zatín, Slovakia

Cernavodă

- Krško, Slovenia
- Saint-Sébastien-sur-Loire, France

Ciceu

- Bogyiszló, Hungary
- Dębica (rural gmina), Poland
- Kétpó, Hungary
- Tápiószecső, Hungary
- Újszász, Hungary
- Zugló (Budapest), Hungary

Cisnădie

- Château-Thierry, France
- Hola Prystan, Ukraine
- Wernigerode, Germany

Ciumani

- Baktalórántháza, Hungary
- Dány, Hungary
- Erdőbénye, Hungary
- Heves, Hungary
- Nenince, Slovakia
- Ráckeve, Hungary
- Totovo Selo (Kanjiža), Serbia

Cluj-Napoca

- Beersheba, Israel
- Braga, Portugal
- Chacao (Caracas), Venezuela
- Cologne, Germany
- Columbia, United States
- Dijon, France
- East Lansing, United States
- Eskişehir, Turkey
- Karaganda, Kazakhstan
- Korçë, Albania
- Makati, Philippines
- Namur, Belgium
- Nantes, France
- Ningbo, China
- Parma Province, Italy
- Pécs, Hungary
- Rockford, United States
- Rotherham, England, United Kingdom
- São Paulo, Brazil
- Suwon, South Korea
- Ungheni, Moldova
- Viterbo, Italy
- Zagreb, Croatia
- Zhengzhou, China

Comarnic

- Savigny-le-Temple, France

Constanța

- Alexandria, Egypt
- (Georgia (country)) Batumi, Georgia
- Brest, France
- Cahul, Moldova
- Callao, Peru
- Cartagena, Colombia
- Fort Lauderdale, United States
- Havana, Cuba
- Istanbul, Turkey
- İzmir, Turkey
- Mobile, United States
- Odesa, Ukraine
- Rotterdam, Netherlands
- Santos, Brazil
- Shanghai, China
- Silivri, Turkey
- Sulmona, Italy
- Tepebaşı, Turkey
- Thessaloniki, Greece
- Trapani, Italy
- Turku, Finland
- Yokohama, Japan

Covasna

- Balatonfüred, Hungary
- Călărași, Moldova
- Csenger, Hungary
- Gyula, Hungary
- Nagykanizsa, Hungary
- Pápa, Hungary

Craiova

- Kuopio, Finland
- Nanterre, France
- Shiyan, China
- Skopje, North Macedonia
- Vratsa, Bulgaria

Cristuru Secuiesc

- Ajka, Hungary
- Csurgó, Hungary
- Derecske, Hungary
- Dévaványa, Hungary
- Dunakeszi, Hungary
- Kalocsa, Hungary
- Karcag, Hungary
- Kunszentmiklós, Hungary
- Lánycsók, Hungary
- Moldava nad Bodvou, Slovakia
- Pesterzsébet (Budapest), Hungary
- Senta, Serbia
- Somogybabod, Hungary

Cugir

- Wasserburg am Inn, Germany

Curtea de Argeș

- Nevers, France
- San Giuliano Milanese, Italy

== D ==
Dăbuleni

- Vaugneray, France

Dej

- Balassagyarmat, Hungary
- Beauvais, France
- Dalfsen, Netherlands
- Le Quesnoy, France
- Tokaj, Hungary

Deva

- Arras, France
- Szigetvár, Hungary
- Yancheng, China

Diosig

- Fontenay-le-Comte, France
- Sládkovičovo, Slovakia

Dorohoi

- Cholet, France
- Drochia, Moldova
- Hertsa, Ukraine
- Ungheni, Moldova
- Vaiano, Italy

Drobeta-Turnu Severin

- Orly, France

Dumbrăvița

- Sándorfalva, Hungary
- Szentes, Hungary
- Žitište, Serbia

== F ==
Florești

- Ghidighici, Moldova
- Slobozia Mare, Moldova

Focșani

- Majdanpek, Serbia
- Tivoli, Italy

== G ==
Galați

- Ancona, Italy
- Brindisi, Italy
- Coventry, England, United Kingdom
- Hammond, United States
- Limón, Costa Rica
- Mykolaiv, Ukraine
- Pessac, France
- Piraeus, Greece
- Sevastopol, Ukraine
- Scottsbluff, United States
- Wuhan, China

Gănești

- Csepel (Budapest), Hungary
- Magyarcsanád, Hungary
- Nagyhegyes, Hungary
- Tiszalúc, Hungary
- Vámosatya, Hungary

Gheorgheni

- Bačka Topola, Serbia
- Békés, Hungary
- Belváros-Lipótváros (Budapest), Hungary
- Cegléd, Hungary
- Eger, Hungary
- Kiskunmajsa, Hungary
- Rákosmente (Budapest), Hungary
- Šamorín, Slovakia
- Siófok, Hungary
- Szigetszentmiklós, Hungary

Gherla

- Forchheim, Germany
- Ronneby, Sweden
- Yzeure, France

Giurgiu

- Dunaújváros, Hungary
- Izmail, Ukraine
- Ruse, Bulgaria

== H ==
Hodod

- Szihalom, Hungary

Horezu

- Clervaux, Luxembourg
- La Destrousse, France

Huedin

- Cassina de' Pecchi, Italy
- Derecske, Hungary
- Enying, Hungary
- Jerash, Jordan
- Leányfalu, Hungary
- Leżajsk, Poland
- Manthelan, France
- Novoselytsia, Ukraine
- Tépe, Hungary

Hunedoara

- Argenteuil, France
- Derince, Turkey
- Kaihua, China
- Parga, Greece
- Szombathely, Hungary
- Zenica, Bosnia and Herzegovina

== I ==
Iași

- Ashdod, Israel
- Athens, United States
- Chernivtsi, Ukraine
- Chișinău, Moldova
- Filacciano, Italy
- Forano, Italy
- Ilioupoli, Greece
- Isfahan, Iran
- Jericho, Palestine
- Monterrey, Mexico
- Morlupo, Italy
- Nazzano, Italy
- Padua, Italy
- Peristeri, Greece
- Poitiers, France
- Sant'Oreste, Italy
- Torrita Tiberina, Italy
- Ungheni, Moldova
- Veliko Tarnovo, Bulgaria
- Villeneuve-d'Ascq, France
- Xi'an, China

Ibănești is a member of the Charter of European Rural Communities, a town twinning association across the European Union, alongside with:

- Bienvenida, Spain
- Bièvre, Belgium
- Bucine, Italy
- (Republic of Ireland) Cashel, Ireland
- Cissé, France
- Desborough, England, United Kingdom
- Esch (Haaren), Netherlands
- Hepstedt, Germany
- Kandava (Tukums), Latvia
- Kannus, Finland
- Kolindros, Greece
- Lassee, Austria
- Medzev, Slovakia
- Næstved, Denmark
- Nagycenk, Hungary
- Nadur, Malta
- Ockelbo, Sweden
- Pano Lefkara, Cyprus
- Põlva, Estonia
- Samuel (Soure), Portugal
- Starý Poddvorov, Czech Republic
- Strzyżów, Poland
- Svoge, Bulgaria
- Tisno, Croatia
- Troisvierges, Luxembourg
- Žagarė (Joniškis), Lithuania

Iernut

- Sint-Katelijne-Waver, Belgium

Iratoșu

- Dombegyház, Hungary

== J ==
Jimbolia

- Csanádpalota, Hungary
- Dunajská Streda, Slovakia
- Kikinda, Serbia
- Mórahalom, Hungary
- Pusztamérges, Hungary
- Trebur, Germany

== L ==
Lipova

- Battonya, Hungary
- Castelvetro di Modena, Italy
- Csanádpalota, Hungary
- Salindres, France

Lugoj

- Corinth, Greece
- Jena, Germany
- Kriva Palanka, North Macedonia
- Makó, Hungary
- Monopoli, Italy
- Nisporeni, Moldova
- Orléans, France
- Szekszárd, Hungary
- Veliko Gradište, Serbia
- Vršac, Serbia

Lupeni

- Kecel, Hungary

== M ==
Măcin

- Blaye, France

Maieru

- Nort-sur-Erdre, France

Mangalia

- Aywaille, Belgium
- Balchik, Bulgaria
- Banská Bystrica, Slovakia
- Byblos, Lebanon
- General Toshevo, Bulgaria
- Greenport, United States
- Karmiel, Israel
- Laurium, Greece
- Pale (Istočno Sarajevo), Bosnia and Herzegovina
- Piran, Slovenia
- Porto Viro, Italy
- Santa Severina, Italy
- Struga, North Macedonia

Marghita

- Berettyóújfalu, Hungary
- Kiskőrös, Hungary

Mediaș

- Dąbrowa Górnicza, Poland
- De Fryske Marren, Netherlands
- Mineral Wells, United States
- Sopron, Hungary
- Wittenberg, Germany

Miercurea Ciuc

- Bălți, Moldova
- Bečej, Serbia
- Budakeszi, Hungary
- Cegléd, Hungary
- Gödöllő, Hungary
- Gyula, Hungary
- Heves, Hungary
- Kaposvár, Hungary
- Makó, Hungary
- Óbuda-Békásmegyer (Budapest), Hungary
- Riehen, Switzerland
- Székesfehérvár, Hungary
- Tiszaújváros, Hungary
- Želiezovce, Slovakia

Miercurea Nirajului

- Aszód, Hungary
- Csorna, Hungary
- Hajdúdorog, Hungary
- Mór, Hungary
- Örkény, Hungary
- Simontornya, Hungary
- Szerencs, Hungary

Mioveni

- Landerneau, France
- Măgdăcești, Moldova
- Petrich, Bulgaria

Moreni

- Torres Novas, Portugal

== N ==
Nădlac

- Brezno, Slovakia
- Budmerice, Slovakia
- Jelšava, Slovakia
- Kovačica, Serbia
- Krompachy, Slovakia
- Nagylak, Hungary
- Nový Bydžov, Czech Republic
- Pukanec, Slovakia
- Tótkomlós, Hungary
- Východná, Slovakia

Năsăud

- Alexandreia, Greece
- Kavadarci, North Macedonia
- Mandello del Lario, Italy
- Mława, Poland

Năvodari

- Gemlik, Turkey
- Kavarna, Bulgaria
- Kruševo, North Macedonia
- Rîșcani (Chișinău), Moldova
- Teruel, Spain

Negrești-Oaș

- Alter do Chão, Portugal
- Csenger, Hungary
- Guidel, France
- Tiachiv, Ukraine

== O ==
Odorheiu Secuiesc

- Barcs, Hungary
- Békéscsaba, Hungary
- Berehove, Ukraine
- Budapest, Hungary
- Budavár (Budapest), Hungary
- Cegléd, Hungary
- Dunajská Streda, Slovakia
- Hajdúdorog, Hungary
- Keszthely, Hungary
- Pestszentlőrinc-Pestszentimre (Budapest), Hungary
- Soroksár (Budapest), Hungary
- Subotica, Serbia
- Tatabánya, Hungary
- Tihany, Hungary
- Törökbálint, Hungary
- Vác, Hungary

Onești

- Edineț, Moldova
- Eysines, France
- Skien, Norway
- Strășeni, Moldova

Oradea

- Ceyrat, France
- Coslada, Spain
- Debrecen, Hungary
- Givatayim, Israel
- Mantua, Italy

Orăștie

- Criuleni, Moldova
- Fenouillet, France
- Helmstedt, Germany
- Jerash, Jordan
- Rahat, Israel
- Sliedrecht, Netherlands

Ovidiu

- Küçükkuyu (Ayvacık), Turkey
- Sulmona, Italy

Ozun

- Alsótold, Hungary
- Csorvás, Hungary
- Fácánkert, Hungary
- Mezőhegyes, Hungary
- Nagykáta, Hungary
- Tolna, Hungary

== P ==
Pantelimon

- Văsieni, Moldova

Pașcani

- Ialoveni, Moldova
- Pașcani, Moldova

Pecica

- Battonya, Hungary
- Woluwe-Saint-Pierre, Belgium

Petroșani

- Bansko, Bulgaria
- Nova Zagora, Bulgaria
- Ponte nelle Alpi, Italy
- Smedjebacken, Sweden
- Várpalota, Hungary

Piatra Neamț

- Alpharetta, United States
- Beinasco, Italy
- Bergama, Turkey
- Ciocana (Chișinău), Moldova
- Edineț, Moldova
- Hlyboka, Ukraine
- Istiaia-Aidipsos, Greece
- Kiryat Malakhi, Israel
- Lod, Israel
- Mably, France
- Manilva, Spain
- Orhei, Moldova
- Riorges, France
- Roanne, France
- Verbania, Italy
- Villerest, France

Pitești

- Beit Jala, Palestine
- Borlänge, Sweden
- Bydgoszcz, Poland
- Caserta, Italy
- Chongqing, China
- Gyumri, Armenia
- Kragujevac, Serbia
- Muntinlupa, Philippines
- Nafplio, Greece
- Ourém, Portugal
- Springfield, United States
- Tynaarlo, Netherlands

Ploiești

- Aspropyrgos, Greece
- Harbin, China
- Hîncești, Moldova
- Lefkada, Greece
- Marousi, Greece
- Osijek, Croatia
- Pińczów, Poland
- Radom, Poland

Plopeni

- Millau, France

Popești-Leordeni

- Belene, Bulgaria

Praid

- Bodony, Hungary
- Emőd, Hungary
- Harsány, Hungary
- Környe, Hungary
- Mezőkovácsháza, Hungary
- Nádasd, Hungary
- Somogyjád, Hungary
- Szegvár, Hungary

Pucioasa

- Cartaxo, Portugal
- Jonava, Lithuania
- Vadul lui Vodă, Moldova

== R ==
Rădăuți

- Briceni, Moldova
- Drochia, Moldova
- Kłodzko, Poland
- Kyrenia, Cyprus
- Pontault-Combault, France
- Ragusa, Italy

Râmnicu Vâlcea

- Agios Nikolaos, Greece
- Ciocana (Chișinău), Moldova
- Dura, Palestine
- Kalamata, Greece
- Kroměříž, Czech Republic
- Kruševac, Serbia

Râmnicu Sărat

- Edineț, Moldova

Reghin

- Bourg-la-Reine, France
- Érd, Hungary
- Lubaczów, Poland
- Nagykőrös, Hungary
- Salle, Italy
- Ungheni, Moldova

Reșița

- Baskil, Turkey
- Bihać, Bosnia and Herzegovina
- Caen, France
- Kikinda, Serbia
- Loreto, Italy
- Marijampolė, Lithuania
- Pančevo, Serbia
- Pesaro, Italy
- Požarevac, Serbia
- Veliko Gradište, Serbia
- Vrgorac, Croatia
- Vršac, Serbia

Roman

- Dilijan, Armenia
- Edineț, Moldova
- Gedera, Israel
- Grugliasco, Italy
- Kamianets-Podilskyi, Ukraine
- Ștefan Vodă, Moldova
- Sunchang, South Korea

Roșiorii de Vede

- Gorna Oryahovitsa, Bulgaria

Rovinari

- Turek, Poland

== S ==
Săcele

- Edineț, Moldova
- Kisújszállás, Hungary
- Vire-Normandie, France

Salonta

- Csepel (Budapest), Hungary
- Hajdúböszörmény, Hungary
- Nagykőrös, Hungary
- Rimavská Sobota, Slovakia
- Sarkad, Hungary
- Túrkeve, Hungary

Sângeorgiu de Pădure

- Baja, Hungary
- Bélapátfalva, Hungary
- Celldömölk, Hungary
- Inke, Hungary
- Kovačica, Serbia
- Loireauxence, France
- Plan-les-Ouates, Switzerland

Sânnicolau Mare

- Burgkirchen an der Alz, Germany
- Kazincbarcika, Hungary
- Potenza Picena, Italy

Satu Mare

- Berehove, Ukraine
- Nyíregyháza, Hungary
- Rzeszów, Poland
- Wolfenbüttel, Germany

Sebeș

- Büdingen, Germany
- Komárno, Slovakia
- Komárom, Hungary
- Siderno, Italy
- Strășeni, Moldova

Seini

- Kalush, Ukraine
- Nyírmeggyes, Hungary
- Sárvár, Hungary

Sfântu Gheorghe

- Alsónána, Hungary
- Balatonszentgyörgy, Hungary
- Cegléd, Hungary
- Ferencváros (Budapest), Hungary
- Givatayim, Israel
- Kanjiža, Serbia
- Kecskemét, Hungary
- Kisbucsa, Hungary
- Kiskunhalas, Hungary
- Kráľovský Chlmec, Slovakia
- Mosonmagyaróvár, Hungary
- Saint-Georges-sur-Cher, France
- Santa Cruz, Portugal
- Sárpilis, Hungary
- Szentes, Hungary
- Veszprém, Hungary

Sibiu

- Columbia, United States
- Deventer, Netherlands
- Durham, United States
- Klagenfurt, Austria
- Landshut, Germany
- Marburg, Germany
- Rennes, France

Sighetu Marmației

- Khust, Ukraine
- Kiryat Yam, Israel
- Kolomyia, Ukraine
- Oława, Poland
- Saint-Hilaire-de-Riez, France

Sighișoara

- Blois, France
- Città di Castello, Italy
- Dinkelsbühl, Germany
- Kiskunfélegyháza, Hungary
- Raška, Serbia
- Sozopol, Bulgaria
- Zamość, Poland

Șimleu Silvaniei

- Albertirsa, Hungary
- Hajdúböszörmény, Hungary
- Nyírbátor, Hungary
- Petah Tikva, Israel
- Szarvas, Hungary
- Tiszavasvári, Hungary

Sinaia

- Aosta, Italy
- Athis-Mons, France
- Cascais, Portugal
- Castelbuono, Italy
- Cetinje, Montenegro
- Chornomorsk, Ukraine
- Dimona, Israel
- Gainesville, United States
- Kuşadası, Turkey
- Thame, England, United Kingdom

Siret is a member of the Douzelage, a town twinning association of towns across the European Union. Siret also has several other twin towns.

Douzelage

- Agros, Cyprus
- Altea, Spain
- Asikkala, Finland
- Bad Kötzting, Germany
- Bellagio, Italy
- (Republic of Ireland) Bundoran, Ireland
- Chojna, Poland
- Granville, France
- Holstebro, Denmark
- Houffalize, Belgium
- Judenburg, Austria
- Kőszeg, Hungary
- Marsaskala, Malta
- Meerssen, Netherlands
- Niederanven, Luxembourg
- Oxelösund, Sweden
- Preveza, Greece
- Rokiškis, Lithuania
- Rovinj, Croatia
- Sesimbra, Portugal
- Sherborne, England, United Kingdom
- Sigulda, Latvia
- Škofja Loka, Slovenia
- Sušice, Czech Republic
- Tryavna, Bulgaria
- Türi, Estonia
- Zvolen, Slovakia

Other

- Castiglione in Teverina, Italy
- Celleno, Italy
- Dali, Cyprus
- Dionysos, Greece
- Graffignano, Italy
- Herrera del Duque, Spain
- Hlyboka, Ukraine
- Kamianets-Podilskyi, Ukraine
- Kamianka, Ukraine
- Wieliszew, Poland
- Wodzisław Śląski, Poland
- Zastavna, Ukraine

Slănic

- Marignane, France

Slatina

- Ispica, Italy

Slobozia

- Nanyang, China
- Razgrad, Bulgaria
- Silistra, Bulgaria
- Veles, North Macedonia

Snagov

- Sarkad, Hungary

Sovata

- Brzesko, Poland
- Budapest XIII (Budapest), Hungary
- Csopak, Hungary
- Mezőberény, Hungary
- Sümeg, Hungary
- Százhalombatta, Hungary
- Szikszó, Hungary
- Tata, Hungary

Suceava

- Bethlehem, Palestine
- Chernivtsi, Ukraine
- Chișinău, Moldova
- Laval, France
- Mahala, Ukraine
- Soroca, Moldova
- Sosnowiec, Poland
- Yinchuan, China

== T ==
Târgoviște

- Castellón de la Plana, Spain
- Căușeni, Moldova
- Corbetta, Italy
- Guilin, China
- Karadeniz Ereğli, Turkey
- Kazanlak, Bulgaria
- Santarém, Portugal
- Targovishte, Bulgaria

Târgu Jiu

- Forbach, France
- Lauchhammer, Germany
- Noci, Italy
- Pendik, Turkey
- Yambol, Bulgaria

Târgu Mureș

- Baja, Hungary
- Ilmenau, Germany
- Kecskemét, Hungary
- Kuşadası, Turkey
- Strumyani, Bulgaria
- Szeged, Hungary
- Újbuda (Budapest), Hungary
- Zalaegerszeg, Hungary

Târgu Neamț

- Bilhorod-Dnistrovskyi, Ukraine
- Dondușeni, Moldova
- Khotyn, Ukraine
- Panazol, France
- Saint-Just-Saint-Rambert, France
- Telenești, Moldova

Târgu Secuiesc

- Gyöngyös, Hungary
- Hatvan, Hungary
- Kisvárda, Hungary
- Maassluis, Netherlands
- Mezőhegyes, Hungary
- Mezőkövesd, Hungary
- Nagyatád, Hungary
- Paks, Hungary
- Szentendre, Hungary
- Terézváros (Budapest), Hungary

Târnăveni

- Hajdúszoboszló, Hungary
- Ronchin, France

Tăuții-Măgherăuș

- Aszód, Hungary
- Martfű, Hungary
- Tisovec, Slovakia
- Tuchów, Poland

Timișoara

- Chernivtsi, Ukraine
- Da Nang, Vietnam
- Faenza, Italy
- Gera, Germany
- Graz, Austria
- Karlsruhe, Germany
- Lublin, Poland
- Mulhouse, France
- Nottingham, England, United Kingdom
- Novi Sad, Serbia
- Palermo, Italy
- Porto, Portugal
- Rueil-Malmaison, France
- Szeged, Hungary
- Treviso, Italy
- Trujillo, Peru

Toplița

- Budapest XV (Budapest), Hungary
- Marcali, Hungary

Tulcea

- Aalborg, Denmark
- Altena, Netherlands
- Amasya, Turkey
- Aprilia, Italy
- Fratta Polesine, Italy
- Ilion, Greece
- Izmail, Ukraine
- Larnaca, Cyprus
- Mudanya, Turkey
- Rovigo, Italy
- Shumen, Bulgaria

Turda

- Angoulême, France
- Bihartorda, Hungary
- Hódmezővásárhely, Hungary
- Kiskunfélegyháza, Hungary
- Szydłowiec, Poland
- Torda (Žitište), Serbia

== U ==
Uivar

- Algyő, Hungary

Ungheni

- Carmiano, Italy

== V ==
Vaslui

- Cahul, Moldova
- Quarrata, Italy
- Radoviš, North Macedonia
- San Fernando de Henares, Spain

Vatra Dornei

- Florești, Moldova
- Koziegłowy, Poland
- Yasinia, Ukraine

Vetiș

- Csenger, Hungary
- Szamoskér, Hungary

Vicovu de Sus

- Cesson, France

Vișeu de Sus

- Fürstenfeld, Austria
- Staunton, United States
- Verkhovyna, Ukraine
- Zug, Switzerland

Vlăhița

- Balatonlelle, Hungary
- Balatonboglár, Hungary
- Baracs, Hungary
- Cegléd, Hungary
- Látrány, Hungary
- Szarvas, Hungary

== Z ==
Zalău

- Kamianets-Podilskyi, Ukraine
- Szentendre, Hungary

Zărnești

- Markkleeberg, Germany

Zetea

- Balatonfenyves, Hungary
- Balatonföldvár, Hungary
- Bozsok, Hungary
- Darnózseli, Hungary
- Derekegyház, Hungary
- Grand-Aigueblanche, France
- Gyöngyöspata, Hungary
- Kismányok, Hungary
- Kismaros, Hungary
- Nagymányok, Hungary
- Sárbogárd, Hungary
- Tiszanána, Hungary
- Tvrdošovce, Slovakia
