= Szálka =

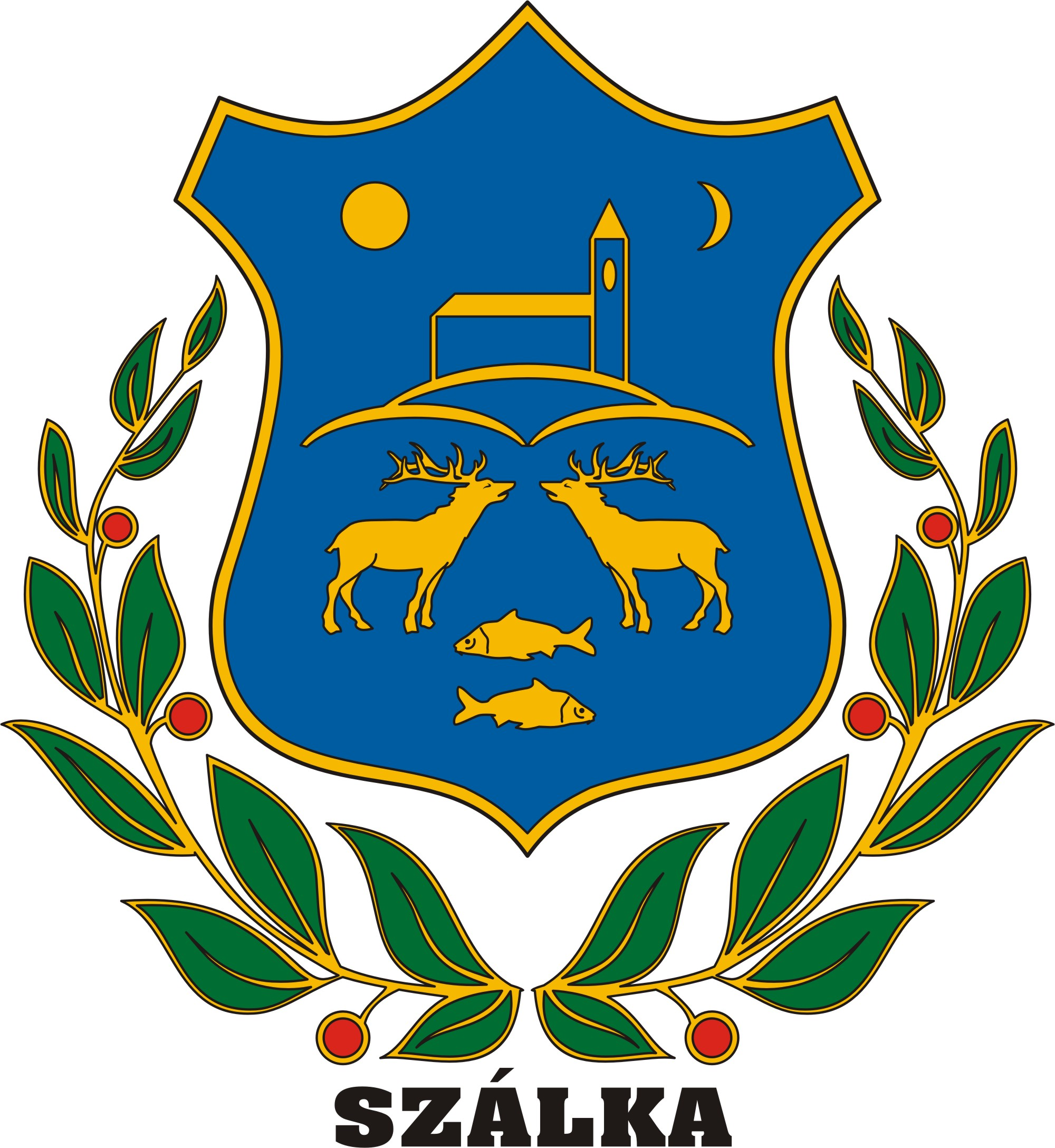
- Coat of arms

- Location of Szálka in Hungary
- Coordinates: 46°16′29″N 18°38′09″E
- Country: Hungary
- Region: Southern Transdanubia
- County: Tolna

Area
  - Total: 17.1 km^{2} (6.6 sq mi)

Population (2011)
  - Total: 597
  - Density: 34.9/km^{2} (90.4/sq mi)
- Time zone: UTC+1 (CET)
  - Summer (DST): UTC+2 (CEST)
- Postal code: 7121
- Area code: +36 74
- Website: www.szalka.hu

Szálka is a village in Tolna county, Hungary, in Szekszárd District.

== Geography and location ==
It is situated in two valleys near a hill region in a forested area.

The neighboring settlements are: from the northeast Szekszárd, from the southeast of Alsónána, Mórágy from the south, Mőcsény from the southwest, and Grábóc from the west.

Mőcsény is 5 km away, Grábóc is 6 km away, Bátaapáti is 9 km away. The two closest towns are Szekszárd and Bonyhád, both of which are 12 km away.

It can be reached by Road 56.

== History ==
The settlement was founded around the time of the conquest of the Carpathian Basin. It was first mentioned in 1015 as Zaka. A church was built in the early 14th century in the village. In 1690, the settlements were mentioned as Kis- and Nagy-Szalka ("small and large Szalka"). In the former there were 12 houses, and in the latter there were 15 houses. 8 German settler families arrived to the village in 1776, and the village was mostly populated by Germans until 1945. Before 1910, the village was also called "Szaka". In 1946, the German population of the village was deported to Germany, and Hungarian settlers were moved to the village, most of which left the village later due to urbanization, leading to a population decrease.

== Population ==
In 2022, 88% of the population declared themselves Hungarian, 13.6% German, 0.7% Romanian, 0.4% Croatian, 0.2% Slovak, 0.2% Serbian, and 3.4% other non-domestic (11.8% not speaking out; due to double identities, the total amount may be greater than 100%). 32% were Roman Catholic, 3.9% Reformed, 0.9% Lutheran, 0.5% Orthodox, 0.4% Israelite, 0.4% Greek Catholic, 0.5% other Christian, 0.9% other Catholics, and 15.9% not belonging to a denomination (44.7% did not respond).
