= Zavod =

Zavod (Cyrillic: завод, Slovak: závod) is a generic word in Slavic languages, meaning factory in Russian, Ukrainian, Belarusian, Bulgarian, Macedonian and Slovak; institution, section in Serbian and Croatian; and race (competition) in Czech. It may refer to:

- Závod, Hungary, a village
- Závod, Slovakia, a village and municipality
- Allan Zavod (1945–2016), Australian pianist, composer, jazz musician and conductor
- Uralvagonzavod
