= Szekszárd District =

Szekszárd District Szekszárdi járás
- Districts of Hungary
- Coat of arms

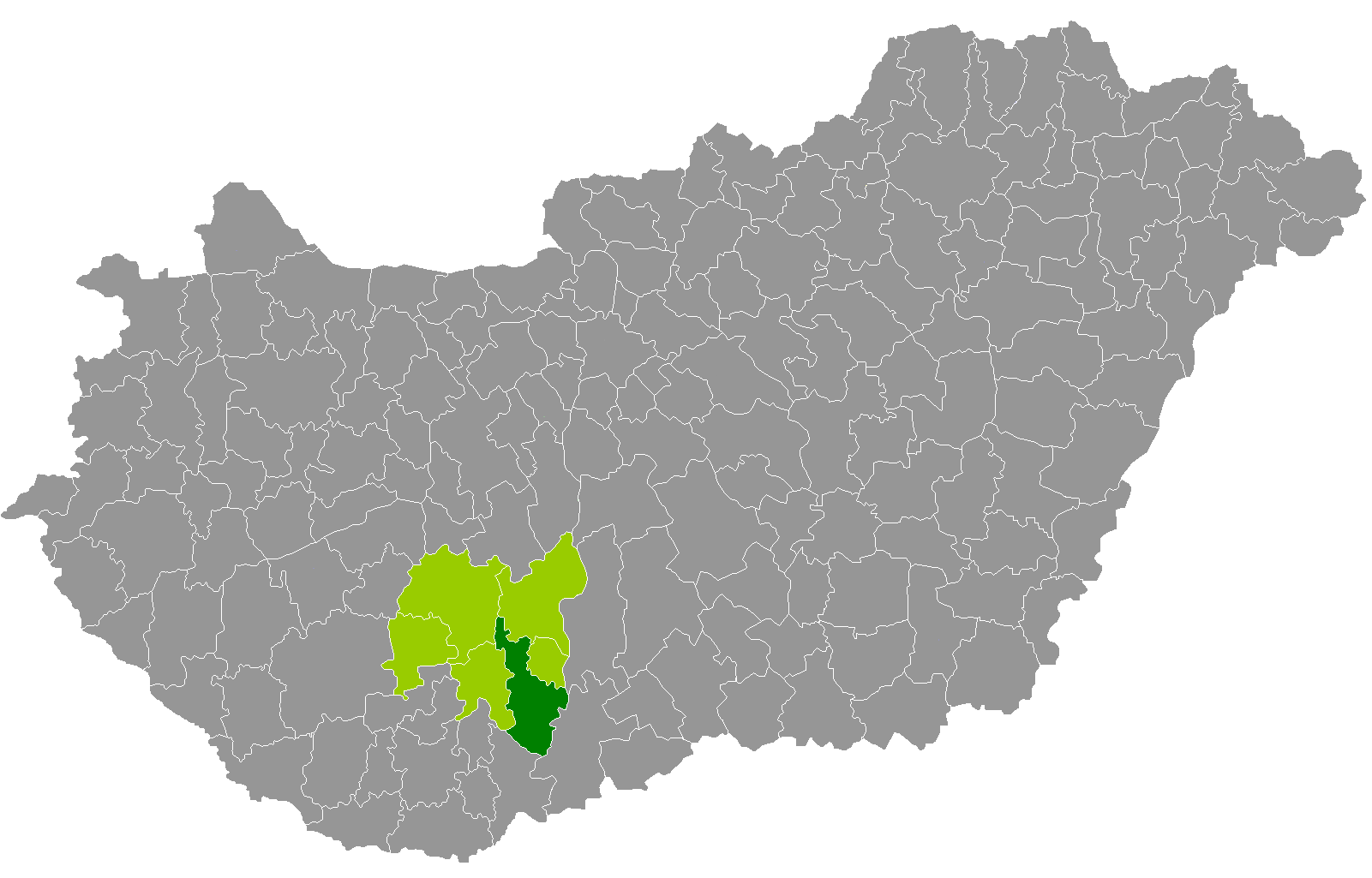
- Szekszárd District within Hungary and Tolna County.
- Coordinates: 46.35°N 18.70°E
- Country: Hungary
- County: Tolna
- District seat: Szekszárd

Area
  - Total: 656.18 km^{2} (253.35 sq mi)
  - Rank: 3rd in Tolna

Population (2011 census)
  - Total: 60,122
  - Rank: 1st in Tolna
  - Density: 92/km^{2} (240/sq mi)

Szekszárd (Hungarian: Szekszárdi járás) is a district in south-eastern part of Tolna County. Szekszárd is also the name of the town where the district seat is found. The district is located in the Southern Transdanubia Statistical Region.

== Geography ==
Szekszárd District borders with Paks District and Tolna District to the north, Baja District (Bács-Kiskun County) to the east, Mohács District (Baranya County) to the south, Bonyhád District and Tamási District to the west. The number of the inhabited places in Szekszárd District is 17.

== Municipalities ==
The district has 1 urban county, 1 town, 1 large village and 14 villages. (ordered by population, as of 1 January 2013)

- Alsónána (731)
- Alsónyék (755)
- Báta (1,742)
- **Bátaszék** (6,380)
- Decs (3,843)
- Harc (898)
- Kistormás (342)
- Kölesd (1,515)
- Medina (769)
- Őcsény (2,365)
- Pörböly (558)
- Sárpilis (670)
- Sióagárd (1,236)
- Szálka (588)
- Szedres (2,284)
- **Szekszárd** (33,599) – district and county seat
- Várdomb (1,137)

The bolded municipalities are cities, italics municipality is large village.

== See also ==
- List of cities and towns in Hungary
