= Aparhant =

- Village
- Coat of arms

- Location of Aparhant
- Coordinates: 46.33213°N 18.45254°E
- Country: Hungary
- Region: Southern Transdanubia
- County: Tolna
- District: Bonyhád

Area
  - Total: 17.97 km^{2} (6.94 sq mi)

Population (2022)
  - Total: 917
  - Density: 51.0/km^{2} (132/sq mi)
- Time zone: UTC+1 (CET)
  - Summer (DST): UTC+2 (CEST)
- Postal code: 7186
- Area code: 74
- KSH code: 26125
- Website: www.aparhant.hu

Aparhant is a village in Tolna County, Hungary.
The chief occupations are agriculture and horticulture.
The education system provides only primary educations, with village inhabitants needing to travel further out for a secondary education.

The population is around 1200 people.
It is known as the highest internet users in the country per capita.
