= Kakasd =

Kakasd Kockrsch
- Village
- Location of Kakasd in Hungary
- Coordinates: 46.34856°N 18.59105°E
- Country: Hungary
- Region: Southern Transdanubia
- County: Tolna
- District: Bonyhád

Area
  - Total: 20.78 km^{2} (8.02 sq mi)

Population (2022)
  - Total: 1,538
  - Density: 74.01/km^{2} (191.7/sq mi)
- Time zone: UTC+1 (CET)
  - Summer (DST): UTC+2 (CEST)
- Postal code: 7122
- Area code: +36 74
- KSH code: 02033

Kakasd (German: Kockrsch) is a village in Tolna County, Hungary.

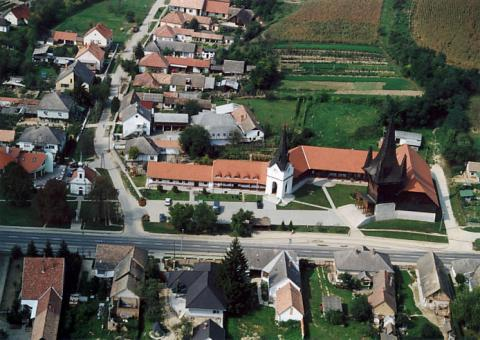
Aerial photography of Kakasd
