= Kéty =

- Village
- Location within Hungary
- Coordinates: 46°26′23″N 18°31′31″E
- Country: Hungary
- Region: Southern Transdanubia
- County: Tolna
- District: Bonyhád

Area
  - Total: 16.51 km^{2} (6.37 sq mi)

Population (2022)
  - Total: 634
  - Density: 38.4/km^{2} (99.5/sq mi)
- Time zone: UTC+1 (CET)
  - Summer (DST): UTC+2 (CEST)
- Postal code: 7174
- Area code: +36 74
- KSH code: 21731

Kéty is a village in Tolna county, Hungary.
