= Györe, Hungary =

Györe
- Village
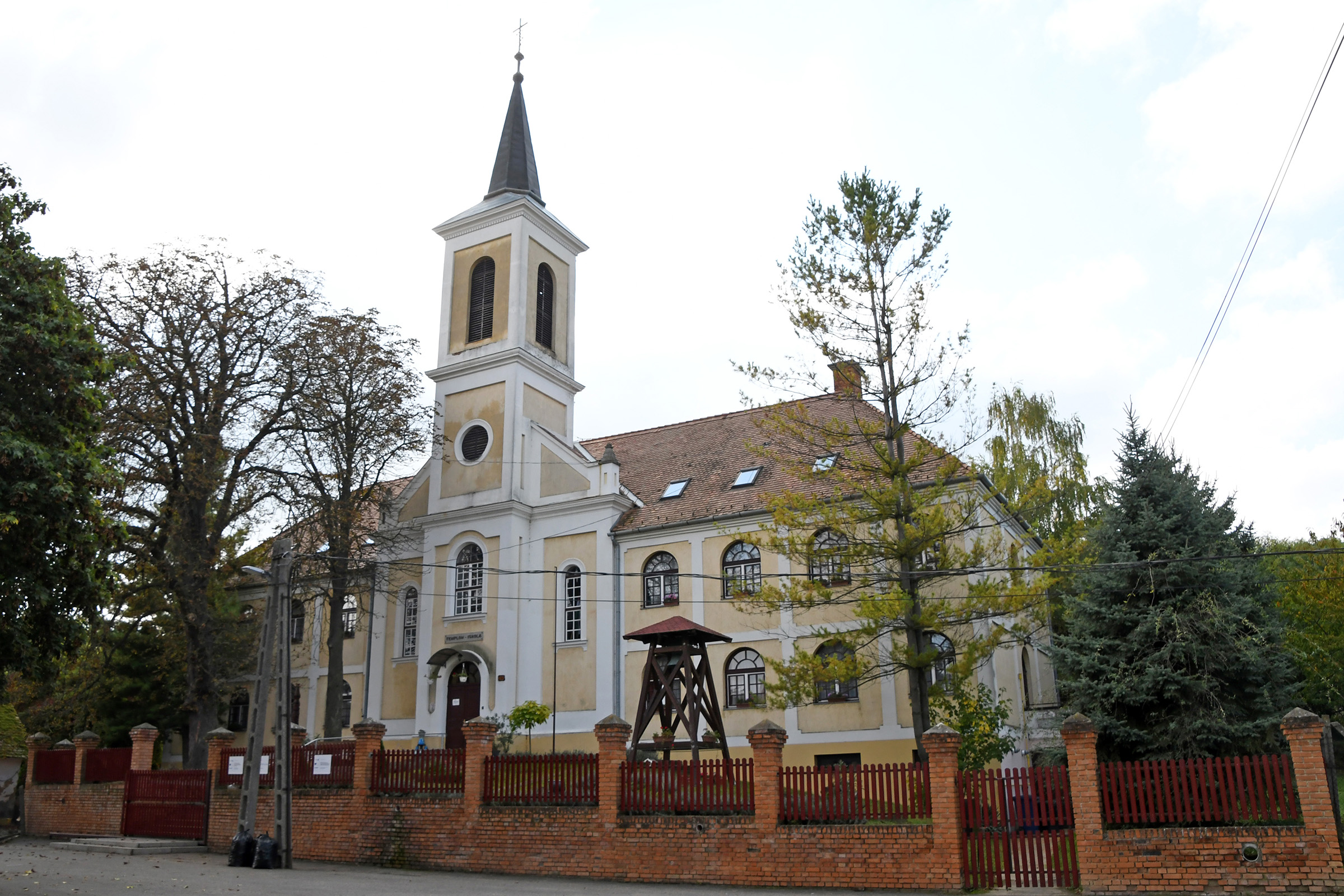
- The former Lutheran church converted into a primary school

- Coat of arms

- Location within Hungary
- Coordinates: 46°17′39″N 18°23′47″E
- Country: Hungary
- Region: Southern Transdanubia
- County: Tolna
- District: Bonyhád

Area
  - Total: 11.32 km^{2} (4.37 sq mi)

Population (2022)
  - Total: 579
  - Density: 51.1/km^{2} (132/sq mi)
- Time zone: UTC+1 (CET)
  - Summer (DST): UTC+2 (CEST)
- Postal code: 7352
- Area code: 74
- KSH code: 25539
- Website: www.gyore.hu

Györe is a village in Tolna County, Hungary.
