= Henrik Rohmann =

Hungarian harpist

Henrik Rohmann (4 August 1910, Bátaapáti – 13 October 1978, Budapest) was a Hungarian harpist and harp teacher.

== Biography ==
He was born in Bátaapáti, in Tolna County, which was mainly inhabited by Germans. This may have influenced his choice of musical instruments, as the harp was very popular among the German people in his community. Many wandering harpists lived in the counties south of Lake Balaton.

Between 1926 and 1934, Rohmann studied at the Academy of Music in Budapest as a student of Otto Mosshammer. In 1938, he was a scholar at the Hungarian Opera House. After the war, in 1945, he became a professional musician with the Opera House, where he remained as its harpist until his retirement in 1971.

From 1948, he was a harp teacher at the Béla Bartók Music Institute in Budapest. He had many disciples who later became famous; for example, Erzsébet Gaál, Andrea Kocsis, Anna Lelkes, Éva Maros, Andrea Vigh and Aristid von Würtzler.

Rohmann was also involved in the international music scene. Würtzler invited him to the USA repeatedly, where he gave master classes at the University of Hartford in 1964 and 1969. There, he met the French professor, Pierre Jamet, founder of the first World Harp Congress. He attended several international harp competitions as a member of the jury. He was a friend of Jakob Müller, the Russian violinist, with whom he toured in 1958. Also in 1958, he gave a concert with contrabassist Zoltán Tibay, which was recorded for television in Paris.

In 1965, Rohmann performed at the Hungarian premiere of Ernő Dohnányi’s 'Harp competition', conducted by Pál Varga. He played this composition again with the Saint Stephen Symphony Orchestra at the Academy of Music on 10 November 1975. In 1962, as a member of the Hungarian quintet with János Szebenyi, Zoltán Dőry, József Iványi and Eszter Isépy, he presented László Lajtha's composition, which was written for flute, violin, viola, cello and harp and marked II. Quintet, Op. 46.

== Memory ==
Harold Schiffman, an American composer and former pupil of Dohnányi, dedicated his composition called 'Suite for Two Harps' to Henrik Rohmann. This piece was composed in 2005, at the request of the Hungarian Harp Duo (Adél Bélyei and Mária Gogolyák). The parts of the eight-minute piece are: 1. Moto Perpetuo, 2. Dialogue, 3. Scherzino, 4. Canonic Intermezzo, 5. Toccata. In 2006, Schiffman prepared a transcript for Imre Rohmann and Tünde Kurucz, titled 'Suite for Two Pianos'.

== Bibliography ==
- Rohmann Henrik: The Harp. In: Parlando: Music Pedagogic Journal, ISSN 0133-2767, 1973 (vol. 15) no. 2, pp. 16–18.
- Előd Juhász - István Kaposi Kis: Beszélő hárfa. Aristid von Würtzler. Idegenforgalmi Propaganda és Kiadó Vállalat, Budapest, 1990.
