= Izmény =

- Village
- Coat of arms

- Location within Hungary
- Coordinates: 46°18′53″N 18°24′49″E
- Country: Hungary
- Region: Southern Transdanubia
- County: Tolna
- District: Bonyhád

Area
  - Total: 13.73 km^{2} (5.30 sq mi)

Population (2022)
  - Total: 468
  - Density: 34.1/km^{2} (88.3/sq mi)
- Time zone: UTC+1 (CET)
  - Summer (DST): UTC+2 (CEST)
- Postal code: 7353
- Area code: +36 74
- KSH code: 27711

Izmény is a village in Tolna county, Hungary.
