= Kisdorog =

Kisdorog Kleindorog
- Village
- Location of Kisdorog in Hungary
- Coordinates: 46.38754°N 18.49478°E
- Country: Hungary
- Region: Southern Transdanubia
- County: Tolna
- District: Bonyhád

Area
  - Total: 20 km^{2} (7.7 sq mi)

Population (2022)
  - Total: 637
  - Density: 32/km^{2} (82/sq mi)
- Time zone: UTC+1 (CET)
  - Summer (DST): UTC+2 (CEST)
- Postal code: 7159
- Area code: 74
- KSH code: 17710

Kisdorog (German: Kleindorog) is a village in Tolna County, Hungary.

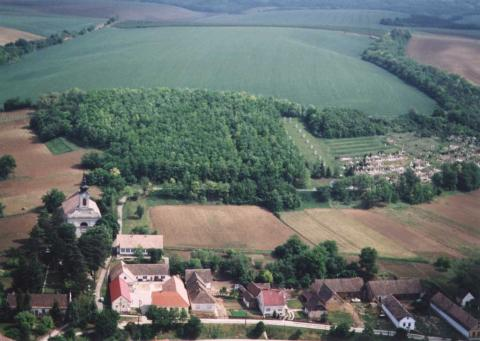
Aerial photography of Kisdorog
