= Felsőnána =

- Village
- Location within Hungary
- Coordinates: 46°27′56″N 18°31′46″E
- Country: Hungary
- Region: Southern Transdanubia
- County: Tolna
- District: Bonyhád

Area
  - Total: 18.9 km^{2} (7.3 sq mi)

Population (2022)
  - Total: 580
  - Density: 31/km^{2} (79/sq mi)
- Time zone: UTC+1 (CET)
  - Summer (DST): UTC+2 (CEST)
- Postal code: 7175
- Area code: 74
- KSH code: 15820
- Website: felsonana.hu

Felsőnána is a village in Tolna county, Hungary.
