= Cikó =

- Village
- Coat of arms

- Location of Cikó in Hungary
- Coordinates: 46.2593°N 18.5614°E
- Country: Hungary
- Region: Southern Transdanubia
- County: Tolna
- District: Bonyhád

Area
  - Total: 19.86 km^{2} (7.67 sq mi)

Population (2022)
  - Total: 856
  - Density: 43.1/km^{2} (112/sq mi)
- Time zone: UTC+1 (CET)
  - Summer (DST): UTC+2 (CEST)
- Postal code: 7161
- Area code: +36 74
- KSH code: 19284
- Website: http://www.ciko.hu

Cikó is a village in Tolna County, Hungary.

Cikó's population is predominantly Hungarian (99.2%).
