= Árpád Potápi =

Hungarian educator and politician (1967–2024)

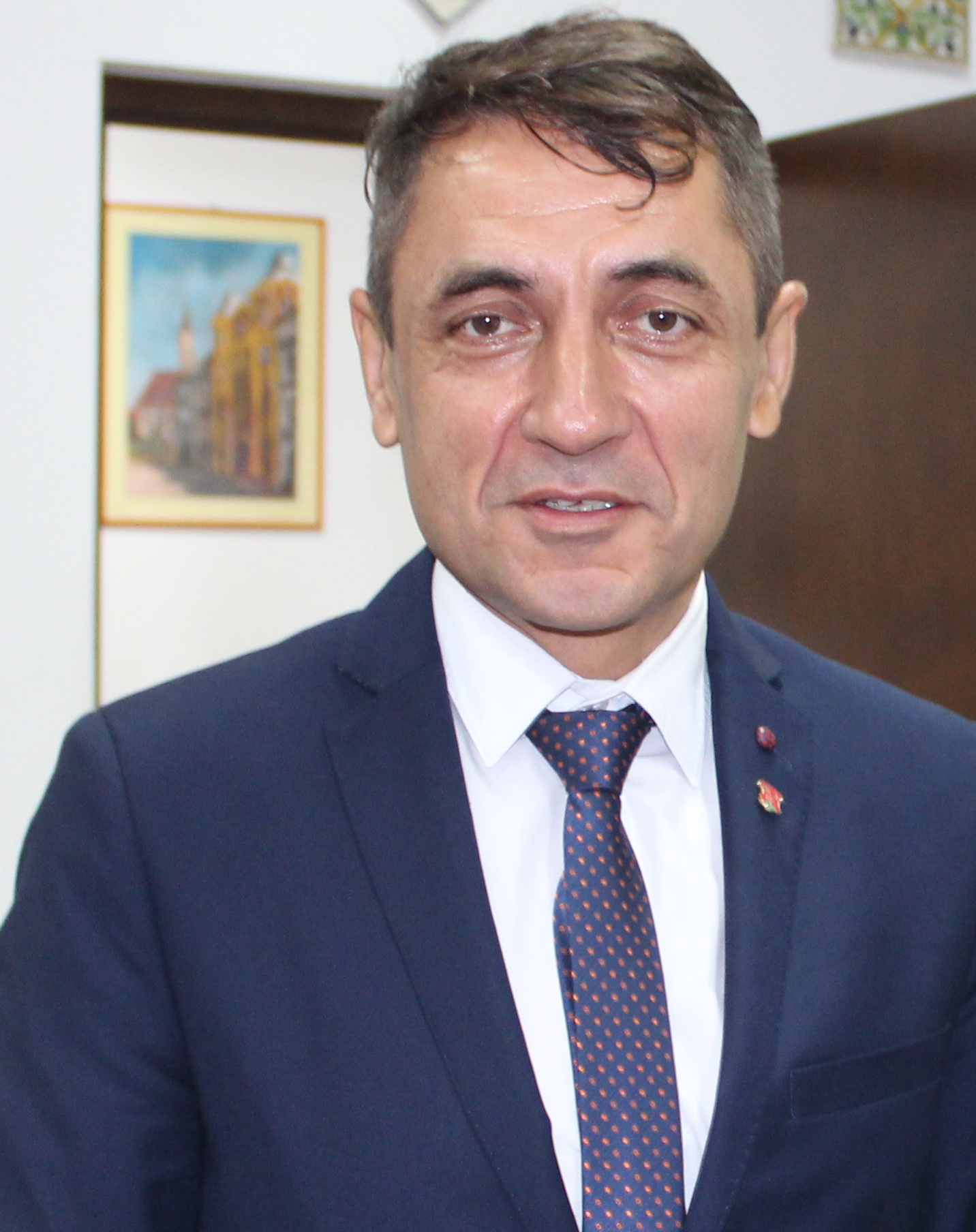
- Potápi in 2017

Member of the National Assembly
- In office 18 June 1998 – 17 October 2024

Personal details
- Born: 28 March 1967 Bonyhád, Hungary
- Died: 17 October 2024 (aged 57) Budapest, Hungary
- Party: Fidesz (1997–2024)
- Children: András Árpád; Katalin Zsuzsanna
- Profession: Politician

Árpád János Potápi (28 March 1967 – 17 October 2024) was a Hungarian educator and politician, member of the National Assembly (MP) for Bonyhád (Tolna County Constituency III) from 1998 to 2014, and for Dombóvár (Tolna County Constituency II) from 2014 until his death. He was elected mayor of his birthplace Bonyhád in 2002, serving in this capacity until 2014. Potápi served as Secretary of State for National Policy from 15 June 2014 to 17 October 2024, his death.

== Early life and career ==
Potápi was born in Bonyhád, Hungary on 28 March 1967. He finished Petőfi Sándor Secondary School at Bonyhád in 1985. He worked as an unqualified teacher at Vörösmarty Mihály Primary School of Bonyhád from 1985 to 1986. In 1991 he graduated from Juhász Gyula Teacher Training College of Szeged as a teacher of Hungarian language, literature, history. In 1994 he graduated in history from Eötvös Loránd University (ELTE).

As a mayor of Bonyhád and head of local government section of the Tolna branch of Fidesz he had a knowledge of local governments. He worked at Red School in Szeged from 1991 to 1993 and from 1993 onwards he taught at Petőfi Sándor Lutheran Secondary School in Bonyhád, a job he retained as an MP. From 1991 to 1993 he was secretary and from 1998 he was president of the National Alliance of Székelys in Bukovina. He was president of the Association of Danubian Europe and of the Bibliocaritas Foundation from 1999, and a member of the Board of Trustees of Illyés Foundation.

Potápi entered into politics in 1993. He headed the campaign of the Bonyhád branch of Fidesz in the general election in 1994. He joined the party itself in 1997. Thereafter he was the head of the Bonyhád branch of the party. He was vice president of the Tolna County organization of the party from 1998. After the transformation into a people's party in 2003 he was appointed the chairmanship of the Bonyhád constituency.

In 1998 and in the national elections of 2002 he was elected MP of his home town Bonyhád. In the middle of March he continued the work he started in the previous term in the Foreign Affairs Committee and until February 2003 he served on the Committee on Human Rights, Minorities and Religion. On 20 October he was elected a local representative and the mayor of Bonyhád as well as a member of the Tolna County Assembly. He secured a seat in Parliament in the 2006 national election from Bonyhád. He was elected member of the Foreign Affairs and Hungarian Minorities Abroad Committee on 30 May 2006. He became the Chairman of the Committee of National Cohesion on 1 January 2011, holding the position until 18 June 2014.

== Personal life and death ==
Potápi was married; later he got divorced. They had two children, András Árpád and Katalin Zsuzsanna.

Potápi died of a heart attack on 17 October 2024, at the age of 57.
