= Gábor Szijjártó =

Hungarian politician

Member of the National Assembly
- Incumbent
- Assumed office 9 May 2026
- Preceded by: Krisztina Csibi
- Constituency: Tolna 2nd

Personal details
- Party: Tisza

Gábor Szijjártó is a Hungarian politician who was elected member of the National Assembly in 2026 representing the Tolna County 2nd constituency. He previously worked as a general practitioner.
