= Bátaapáti =

- Village
- Location in Hungary
- Coordinates: 46.222272°N 18.600239°E
- Country: Hungary
- Region: Southern Transdanubia
- County: Tolna
- District: Bonyhád

Area
  - Total: 20.44 km^{2} (7.89 sq mi)

Population (2022)
  - Total: 362
  - Density: 17.7/km^{2} (45.9/sq mi)
- Time zone: UTC+1 (CET)
  - Summer (DST): UTC+2 (CEST)
- KSH code: 28909

Bátaapáti is a village in Tolna County, Hungary.

== Notable person ==
- Henrik Rohmann (1910-1978), harpist
