= Sectorul Ciocana =

Coordinates: 47°02′10″N 28°53′23″E

Ciocana Sectorul Ciocana
- Administrative Sector
- Ciocana Sector
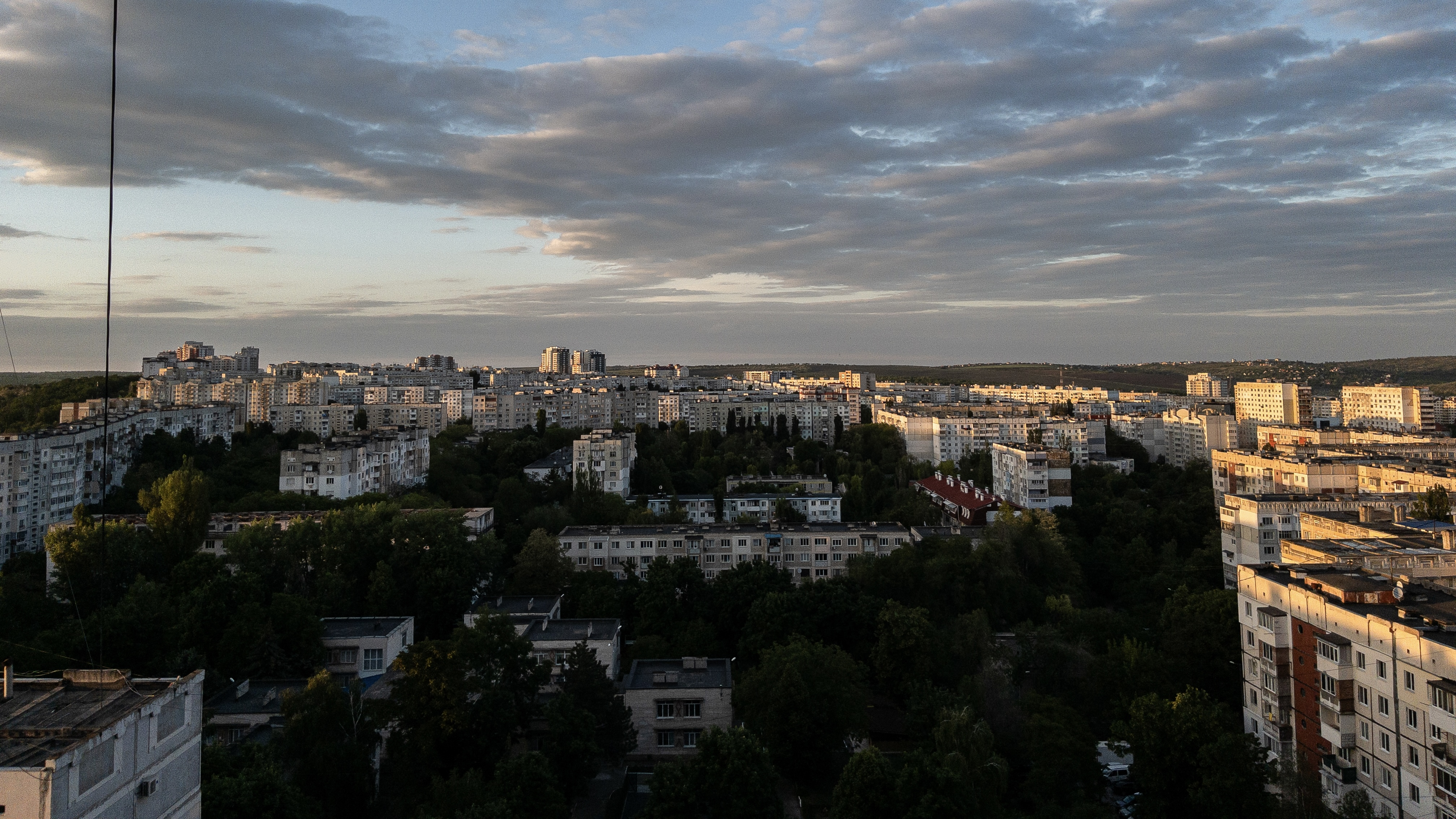

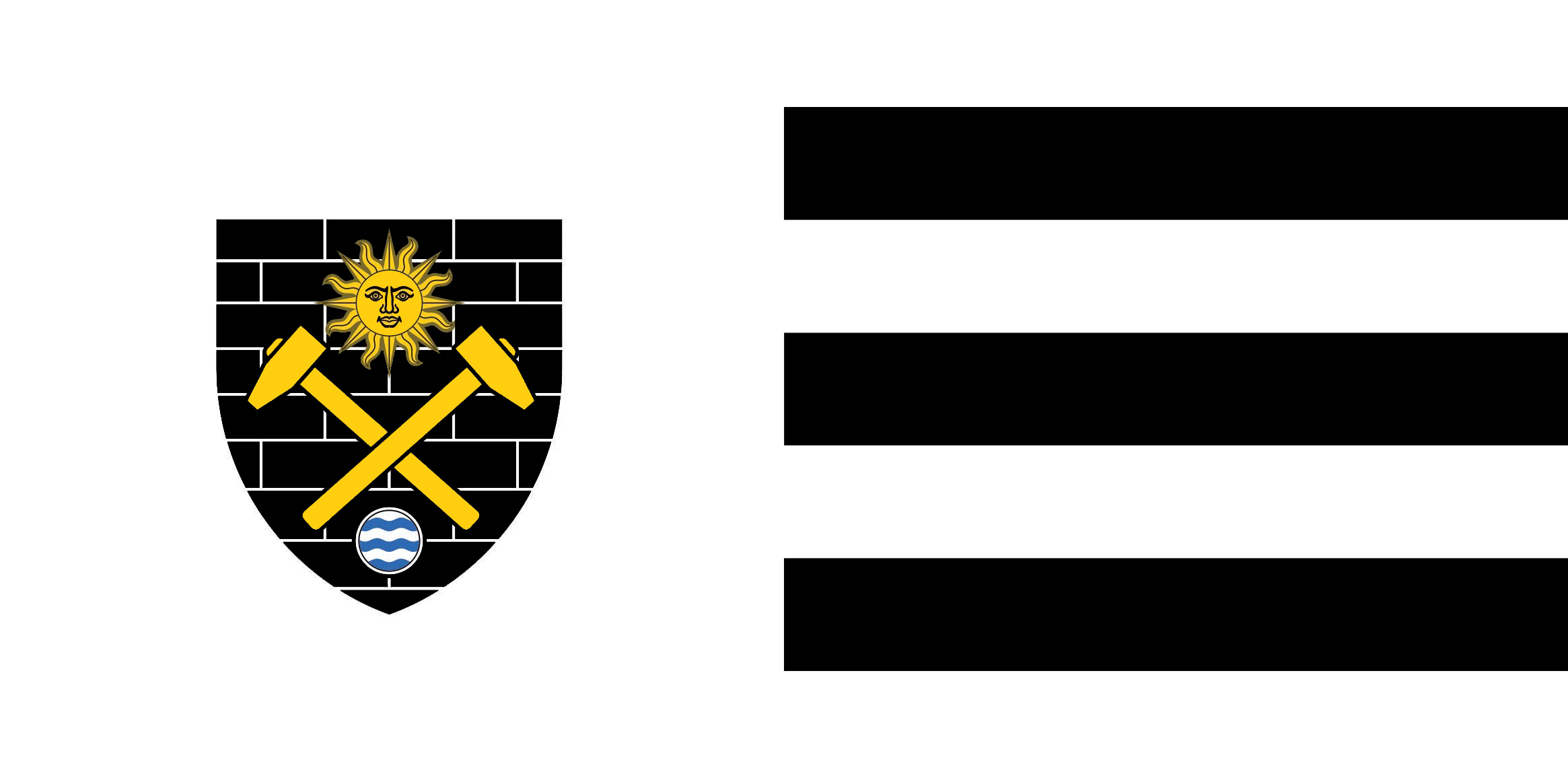
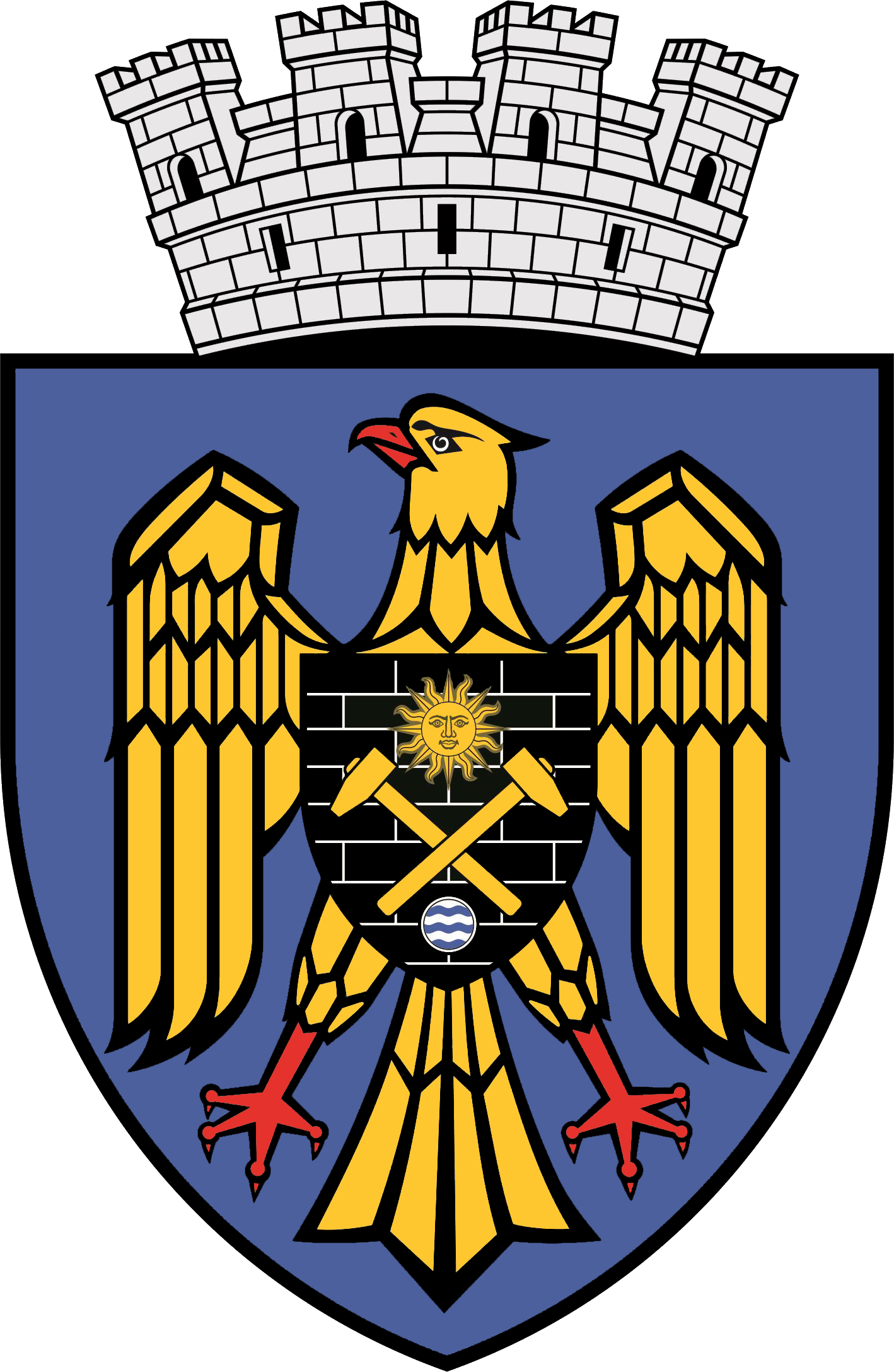
- Flag Coat of arms

- Founder: August 15, 1985

Government
  - Pretor: Sinilga Școlnic

Area
  - Total: 148 km^{2} (57 sq mi)

Population (2013)
  - Total: 119.100
- Time zone: UTC+2 (EET)
  - Summer (DST): UTC+3 (EEST)
- Website: https://ciocana.md/

Sectorul Ciocana (Romanian pronunciation: [t͡ʃoˈkana]) is one of the five sectors in Chişinău, the capital of Moldova. The local administration is managed by a pretor appointed by the city administration. It governs over a portion of the city of Chişinău itself (the eastern part), the town of Vadul lui Vodă, and the communes of Bubuieci, Budeşti, Coloniţa, Cruzeşti and Tohatin. It is largely populated by Moldovans. The name of the sector comes from the name of the former village of Ciocana Nouă, included in the borders of Chisinau only in 1959.

In the Ciocana sector there are 10750 registered economic agents. Ciocana is considered one of the most industrialized sectors of Chisinau.

== History ==
The Ciocana sector was founded as an administrative-territorial unit in August 1985. Today, the Ciocana sector, with an area of 148 km^{2}, includes part of the urban territory of the municipality (27.8 km^{2}): six autonomous administrative-territorial units the city of Vadul lui Vodă and the communes of Budești (Văduleni village), Bubuieci (Humulești and Bîc villages), Cruzești (Ceroborta village), Tohatin (Buneti, Cheltuitori villages) and Colonița village.

Currently, there are several educational institutions operating in Ciocana sector, including 17 pre-schools, 4 primary schools, 3 gymnasiums, 9 high schools, 2 vocational schools and 3 colleges.

== Gallery ==
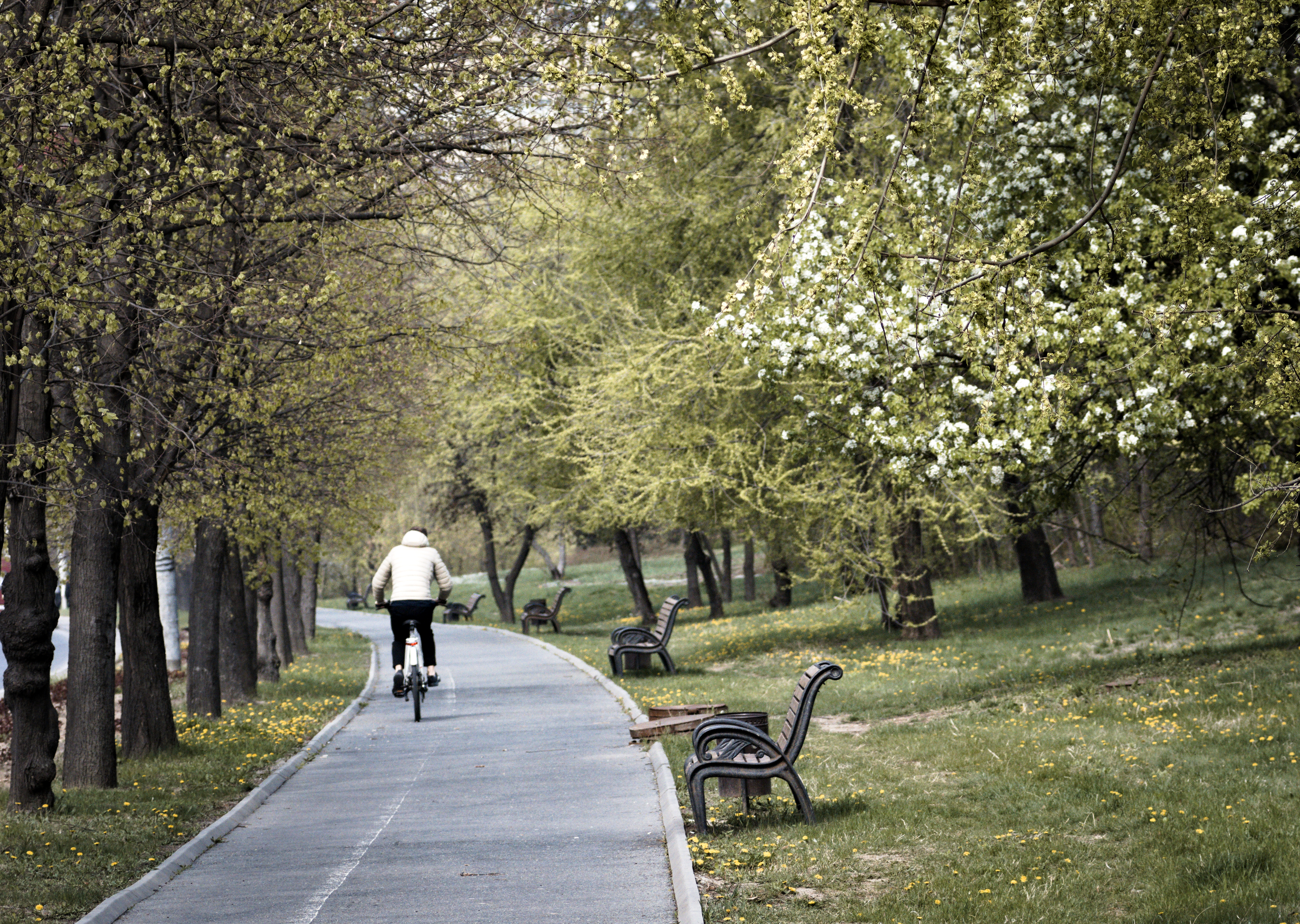

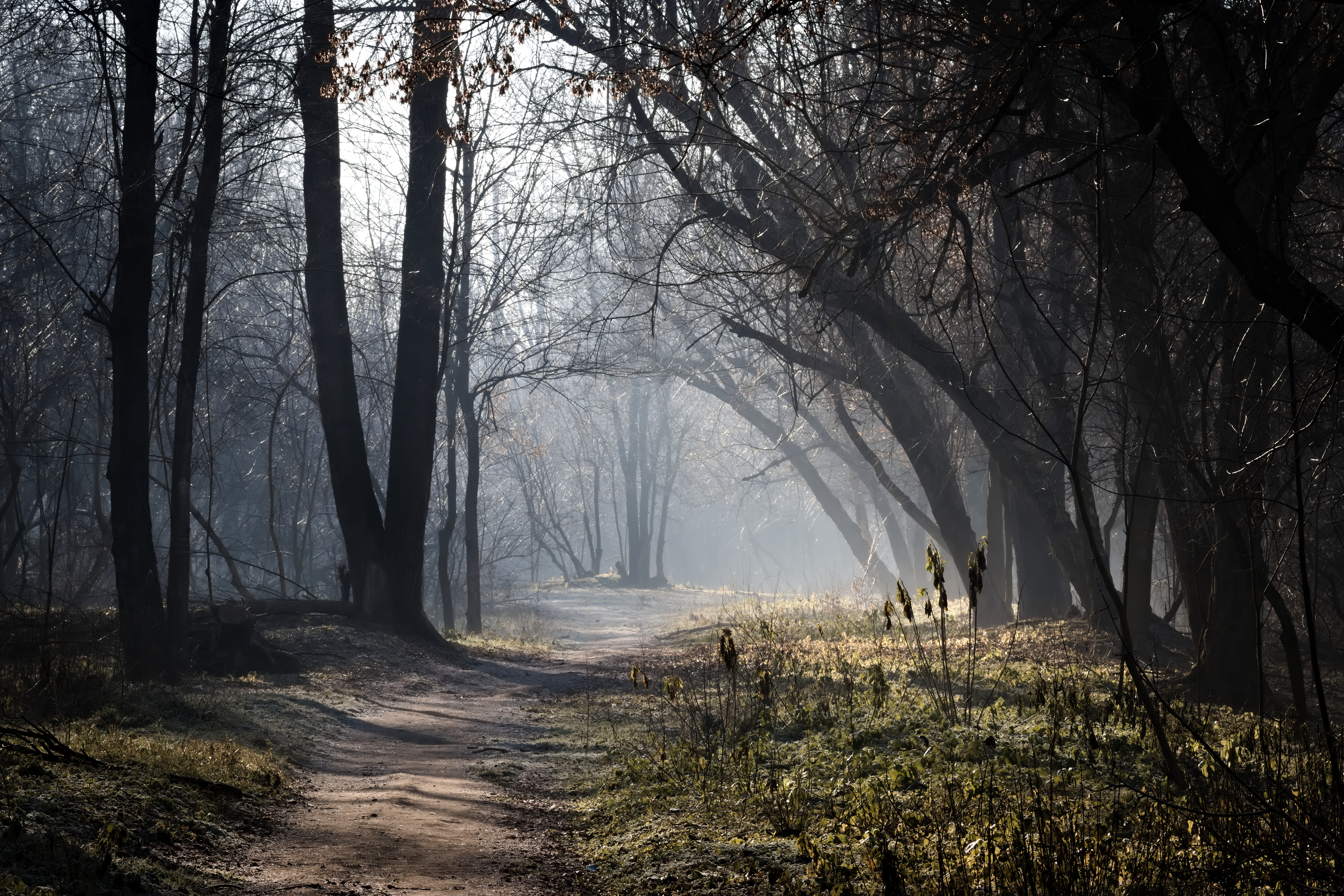

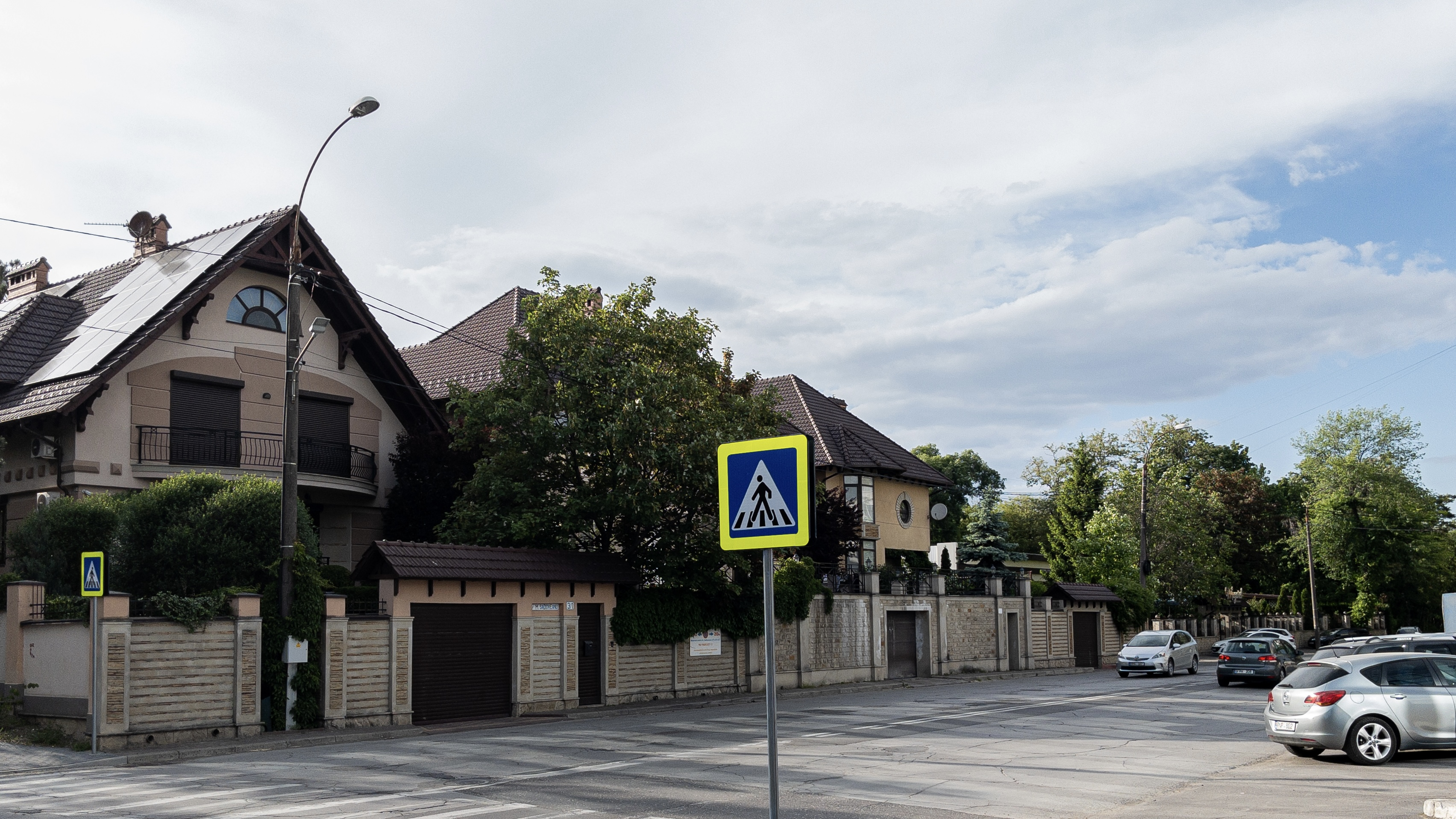

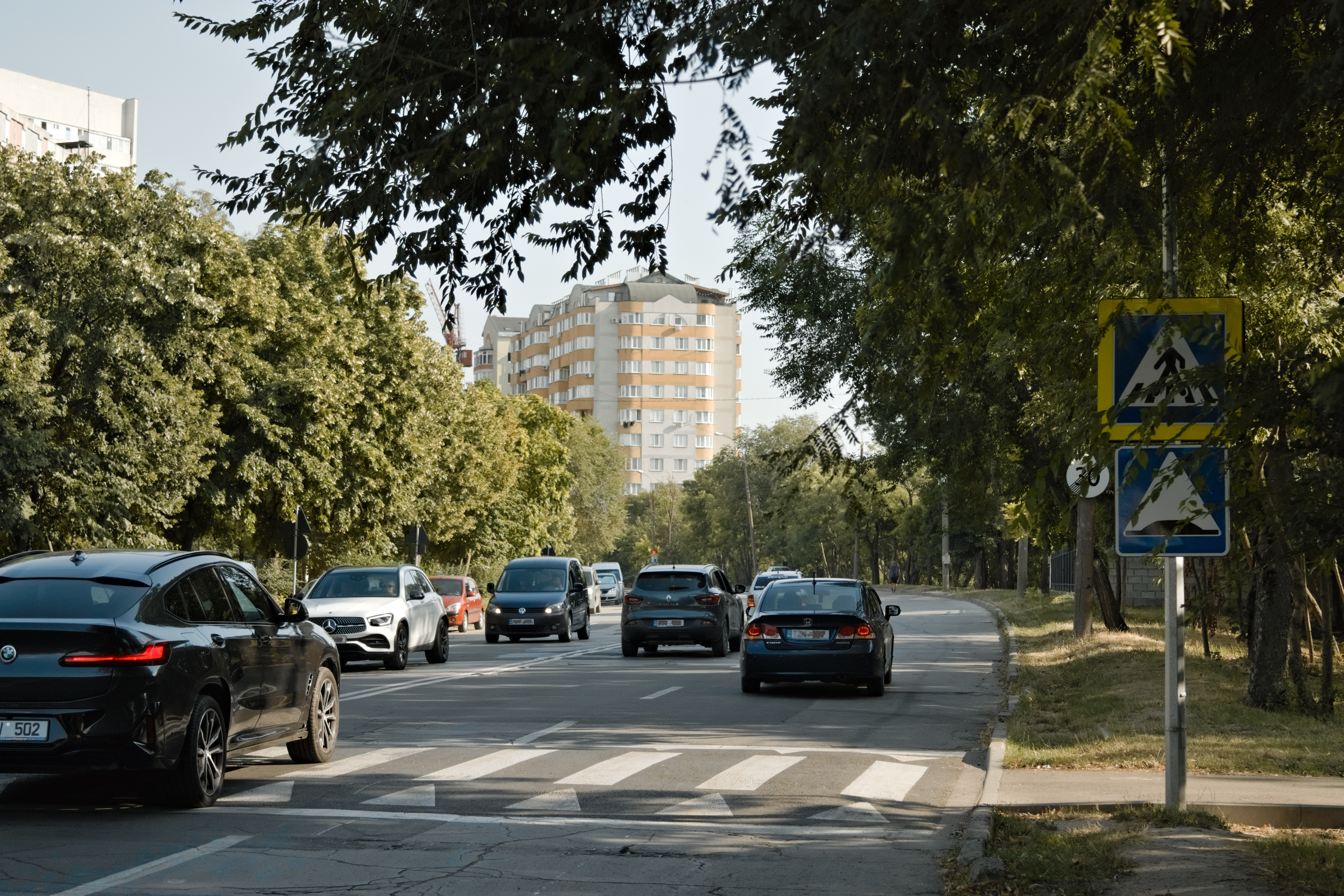
