= Bonyhádvarasd =

- Village
- Coat of arms

- Location of Bonyhádvarasd in Hungary
- Coordinates: 46.36823°N 18.48134°E
- Country: Hungary
- Region: Southern Transdanubia
- County: Tolna
- District: Bonyhád

Area
  - Total: 10.45 km^{2} (4.03 sq mi)

Population (2022)
  - Total: 390
  - Density: 37/km^{2} (97/sq mi)
- Time zone: UTC+1 (CET)
  - Summer (DST): UTC+2 (CEST)
- Postal code: 7158
- Area code: +36 74
- KSH code: 14818
- Website: https://www.bonyhadvarasd.hu

Bonyhádvarasd is a village in Tolna County, Hungary.
