= Nagymányok =

Nagymányok Großmanok
- Town
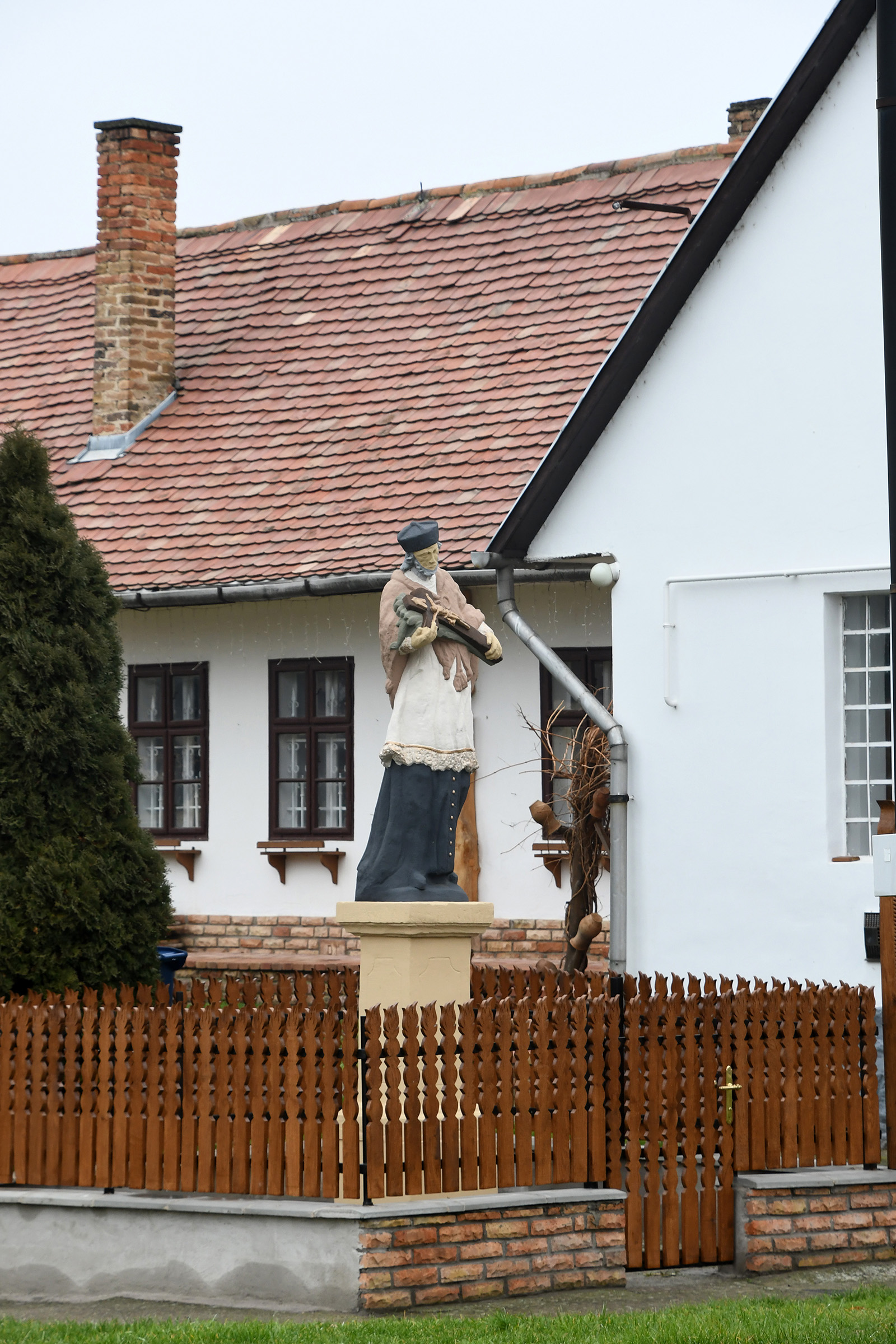
- Statue of John the Apostle in Nagymányok

- Flag Coat of arms

- Location of Nagymányok in Hungary
- Coordinates: 46.28000°N 18.4563°E
- Country: Hungary
- Region: Southern Transdanubia
- County: Tolna
- District: Bonyhád

Area
  - Total: 10.68 km^{2} (4.12 sq mi)

Population (2022)
  - Total: 2,102
  - Density: 196.8/km^{2} (509.8/sq mi)
- Time zone: UTC+1 (CET)
  - Summer (DST): UTC+2 (CEST)
- Postal code: 7355
- Area code: +36 74
- KSH code: 14030
- Website: www.nagymanyok.hu

Nagymányok (German: Großmanok) is a town in Tolna County, Hungary.

== History ==
The town appears first in writing in 1015 as Manek, where it is referenced as a Benedictine monastery. The main industry in the town was coal mining. Following the town's destruction by Turkish forces, it was resettled by Catholic Swabians.

== Demographics ==
As of 2022 the town was 89.9% Hungarian, 11.3% German, 1.8% Gypsy, and 1.9% of non-European origin. 38.5% of the townsfolk are Roman Catholic, 4.8% Lutheran, 2.5% Reformed, and 15.3% non-denominational.
