= Cruzești =

- Commune
- Location within Moldova
- Coordinates: 47°5′5″N 28°58′25″E
- Country: Moldova
- District: Municipiul Chișinău

Government
  - Mayor: Violeta Crudu (PL)

Population (2024)
  - Total: 1,709
- Time zone: UTC+2 (EET)
  - Summer (DST): UTC+3 (EEST)
- Postal code: MD-2085

Cruzești is a commune in Chișinău municipality, Moldova. It is composed of two villages, Ceroborta and Cruzești.
