= Grábóc =

- Village
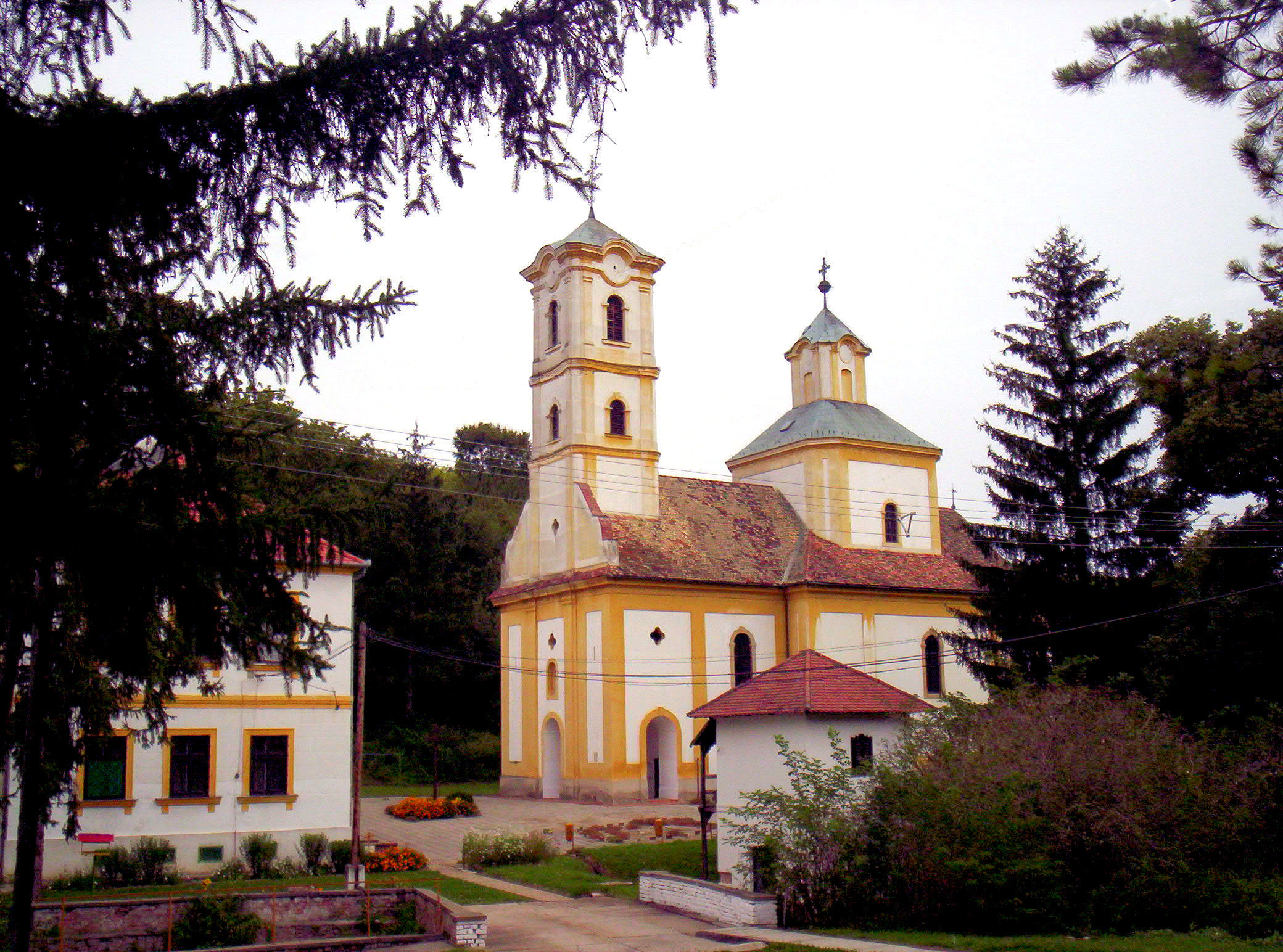
- Serbian orthodox church in Grábóc

- Location within Hungary
- Coordinates: 46°17′20″N 18°36′21″E
- Country: Hungary
- Region: Southern Transdanubia
- County: Tolna
- District: Bonyhád

Area
  - Total: 13.73 km^{2} (5.30 sq mi)

Population (2022)
  - Total: 167
  - Density: 12.2/km^{2} (31.5/sq mi)
- Time zone: UTC+1 (CET)
  - Summer (DST): UTC+2 (CEST)
- Postal code: 7162
- Area code: 74
- KSH code: 26727

Grábóc (German: Grawitz, Serbian: Грабовац, romanized: Grabovac) is a village in Tolna County, Hungary.

== History ==
In the 1300s, the village was already home to a Benedictine church and monastery. Today, the ruins of this monastery can be found to the northwest of the Serb cemetery.

In the 1580s, a large group of Serbs, fleeing Turkish forces, left behind the Drougoubitai monastery, and arrived in Grábóc. Initially, the Serbs constructed a wooden church, but after receiving permission from the Turkish pasha in Buda, they built a stone church in 1587. However, in 1667, the Turks ransacked the monastery, and by 1703, the village was completely depopulated. Following Rákóczi's War of Independence, Serbian villagers and Orthodox monks returned to the village. In 1736, they built a new Serbian Orthodox church, which still stands today.

In the 18th century, Swabians settled in the village alongside the existing Serbian population. These Catholic Germans built their first chapel in 1765, which then expanded into a church in 1795. According to the 1789 census, Germans outnumbered Serbs in the village. Over the 19th and 20th centuries, the Serbian population slowly dwindled.

Following the Second World War, the village's German population (which was its majority) was deported en masse, and replaced with Székely people from Transylvania.

Under the communist regime, due to a strict policy of state atheism, the Patriarch of All Bulgaria was exiled to Grábóc. The Orthodox monastery remained functional until the death of its last monk in 1974, after which the building was converted into social housing. In 1994, the building was transferred back to the Serbian Orthodox Church, and it is now home to nuns.

== Demographics ==
As of 2022, the town in 82.8% Hungarian, 1.8% German, and 1.8% Serbian. 29% of the villagers are Roman Catholic, 3% Reformed, 1.8% Serbian Orthodox, and 29.6% non-denominational.
