= Váralja =

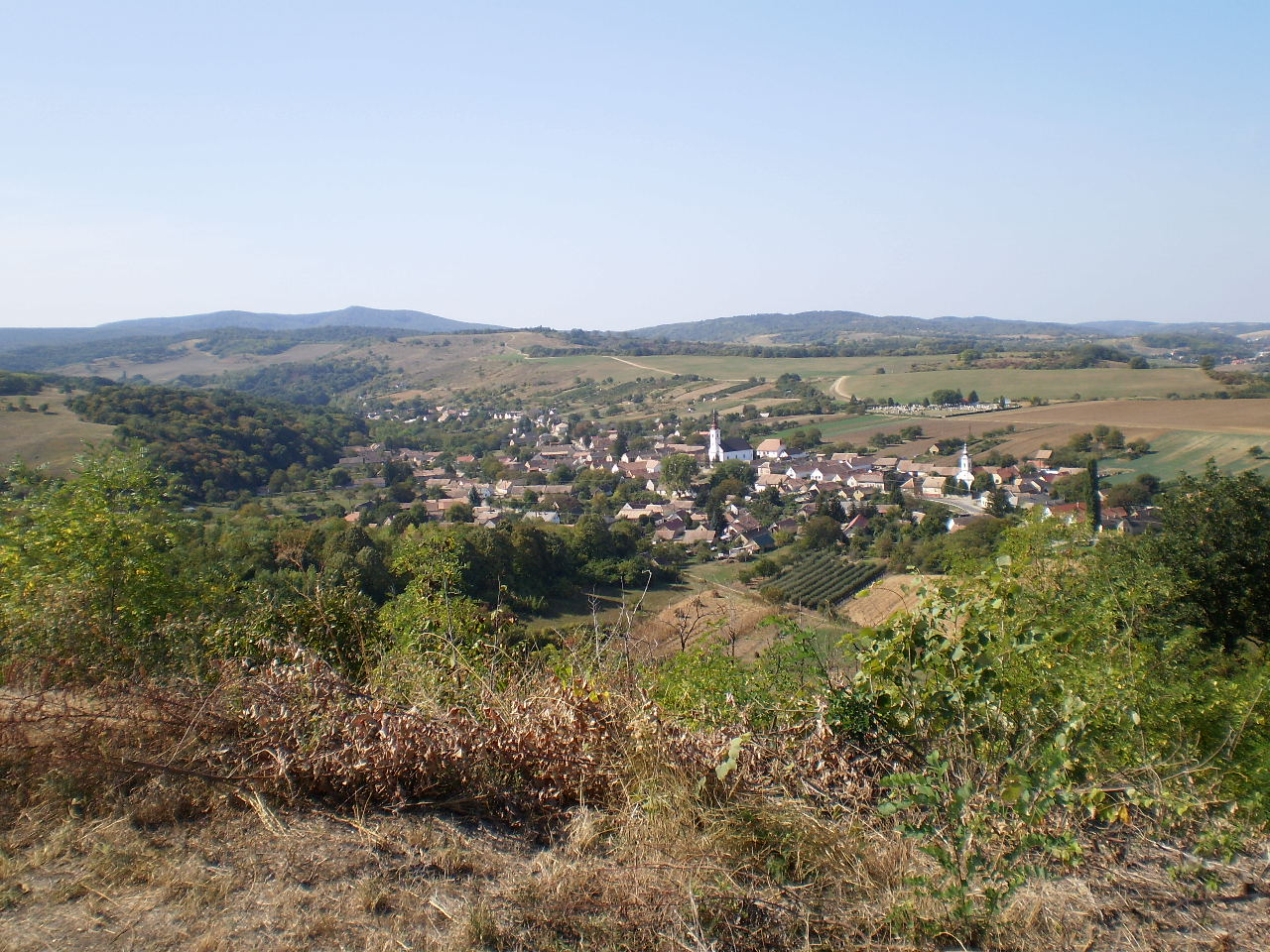
- Váralja from Várfő-mount

- Flag Coat of arms

- Location of Váralja in Hungary
- Coordinates: 46°16′07″N 18°25′50″E
- Country: Hungary
- Region: Southern Transdanubia
- County: Tolna

Area
  - Total: 21.1 km^{2} (8.1 sq mi)

Population (2011)
  - Total: 876
  - Density: 41.5/km^{2} (108/sq mi)
- Time zone: UTC+1 (CET)
  - Summer (DST): UTC+2 (CEST)
- Postal code: 7354
- Area code: +36 74
- Website: www.varalja.hu

Váralja is a village in Bonyhárd district, in Tolna county, Hungary.
