= Kismányok =

- Village
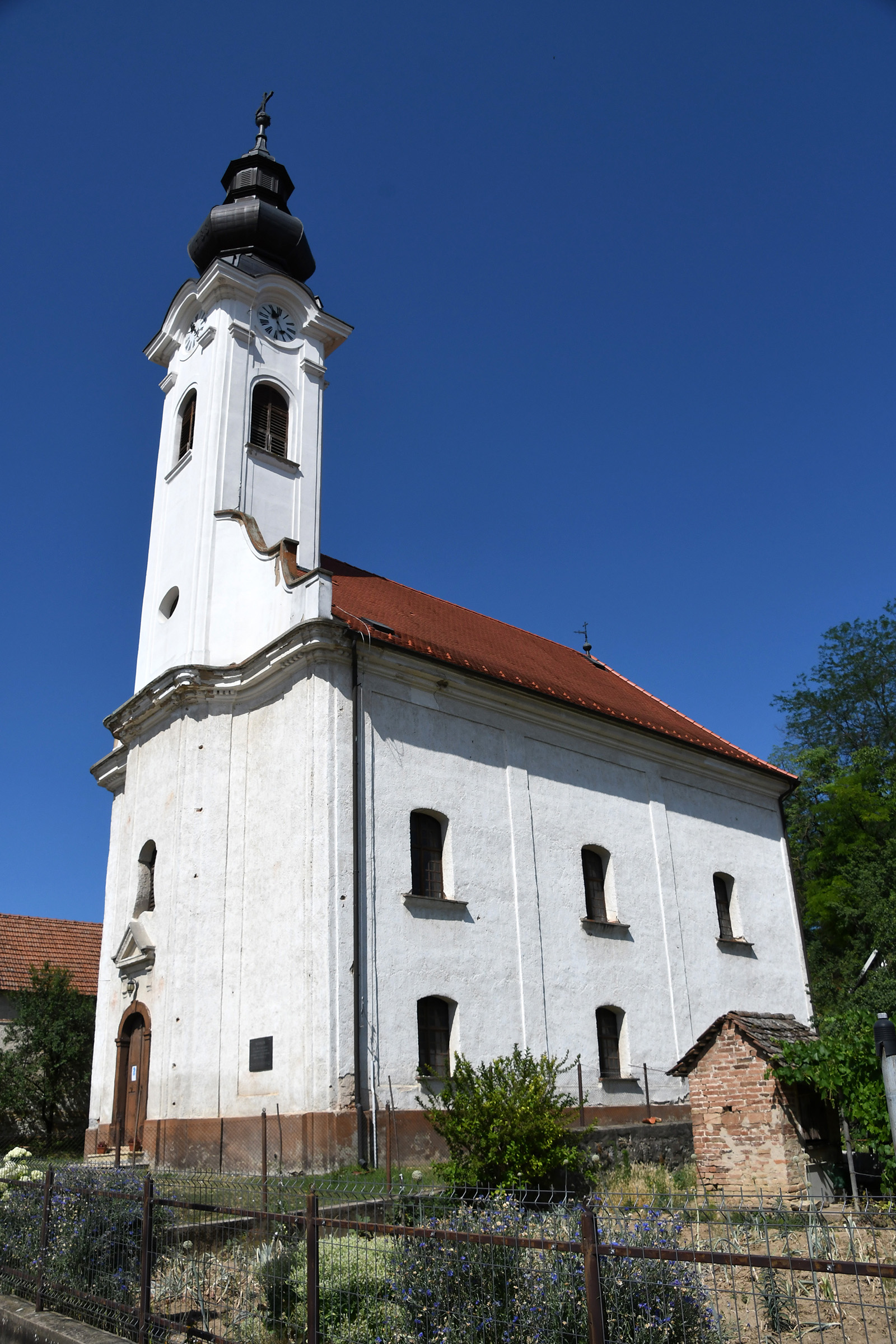
- Lutheran church in Kismányok

- Coat of arms

- Location of Kismányok in Hungary
- Coordinates: 46°16′42″N 18°28′16″E
- Country: Hungary
- Region: Southern Transdanubia
- County: Tolna
- District: Bonyhád

Area
  - Total: 5.43 km^{2} (2.10 sq mi)

Population (2022)
  - Total: 320
  - Density: 59/km^{2} (150/sq mi)
- Time zone: UTC+1 (CET)
  - Summer (DST): UTC+2 (CEST)
- Postal code: 7356
- Area code: 74
- KSH code: 06512
- Website: www.kismanyok.hu

Kismányok is a village in Tolna county, in central Hungary.
