= Tevel =

- Location of Tolna county in Hungary

- Location of Tevel
- Coordinates: 46.41145°N 18.45553°E
- Country: Hungary
- County: Tolna

Area
  - Total: 25.27 km^{2} (9.76 sq mi)

Population (2021)
  - Total: 1,351
  - Density: 66.95/km^{2} (173.4/sq mi)
- Time zone: UTC+1 (CET)
  - Summer (DST): UTC+2 (CEST)
- Postal code: 7181
- Area code: 74

Tevel is a village in Tolna County, Hungary.
