= Kisvejke =

- Location of Tolna county in Hungary

- Location of Kisvejke
- Coordinates: 46.38064°N 18.41298°E
- Country: Hungary
- County: Tolna

Area
  - Total: 11.33 km^{2} (4.37 sq mi)

Population (2004)
  - Total: 416
  - Density: 36.71/km^{2} (95.1/sq mi)
- Time zone: UTC+1 (CET)
  - Summer (DST): UTC+2 (CEST)
- Postal code: 7183
- Area code: 74

Kisvejke (German: Deitschwecke) is a village in Tolna County, Hungary.

Until the end of World War II, the inhabitants were Roman Catholic Danube Swabians, also locally called Stifulder, because the majority of their ancestors once arrived during the 17th and 18th centuries from Fulda (district). Most of the former German settlers were expelled to Allied-occupied Germany and Allied-occupied Austria between 1945 and 1948 after the Potsdam Agreement. As a result, only a few Germans live there; the majority today are the descendants of Hungarians from the Czechoslovak–Hungarian population exchange.

The Stifolder or Stiffoller are a Roman Catholic Subgroup of the Danube Swabians. Their ancestors arrived between 1717 and 1804 from the Hochstift Fulda and surroundings (Roman Catholic Diocese of Fulda), and settled in Baranya and Tolna. They hold their own German Stiffolerisch Schvovish dialect and culture, and have a salami after them.
