= Zomba, Hungary =

Zomba
- Flag Coat of arms

- Location of Tolna county in Hungary

- Location of Zomba, Hungary
- Coordinates: 46.41166°N 18.56483°E
- Country: Hungary
- County: Tolna

Area
  - Total: 57.29 km^{2} (22.12 sq mi)

Population (2010)
  - Total: 2,131
  - Density: 41.17/km^{2} (106.6/sq mi)
- Time zone: UTC+1 (CET)
  - Summer (DST): UTC+2 (CEST)
- Postal code: 7173
- Area code: 74

Zomba is a village in Tolna County, Hungary, not far from Szekszárd. The population in 2008 was 2301 people.

== History ==
Two thousand years ago there was a Roman settlement here. The archeologist discovered here the "Szárnyas Géniusz", a statue from the Roman period. In 1015 King Saint Stephen donated the village to the Pécsvárad Abbey. The old name of the village was Zumba. In 1603 the Turks were in this area, and the residents of Zomba were fled.

From the beginning of the 18th century Dőry László was the possessive of Zomba.

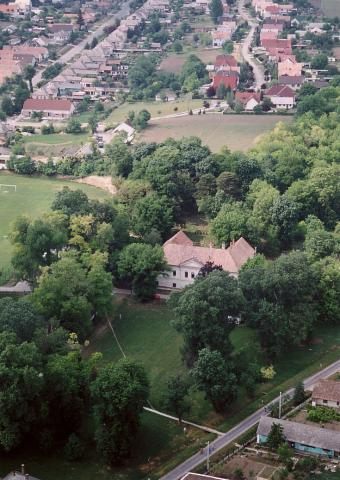
Aerial photography of Zomba
