= Nagyvejke =

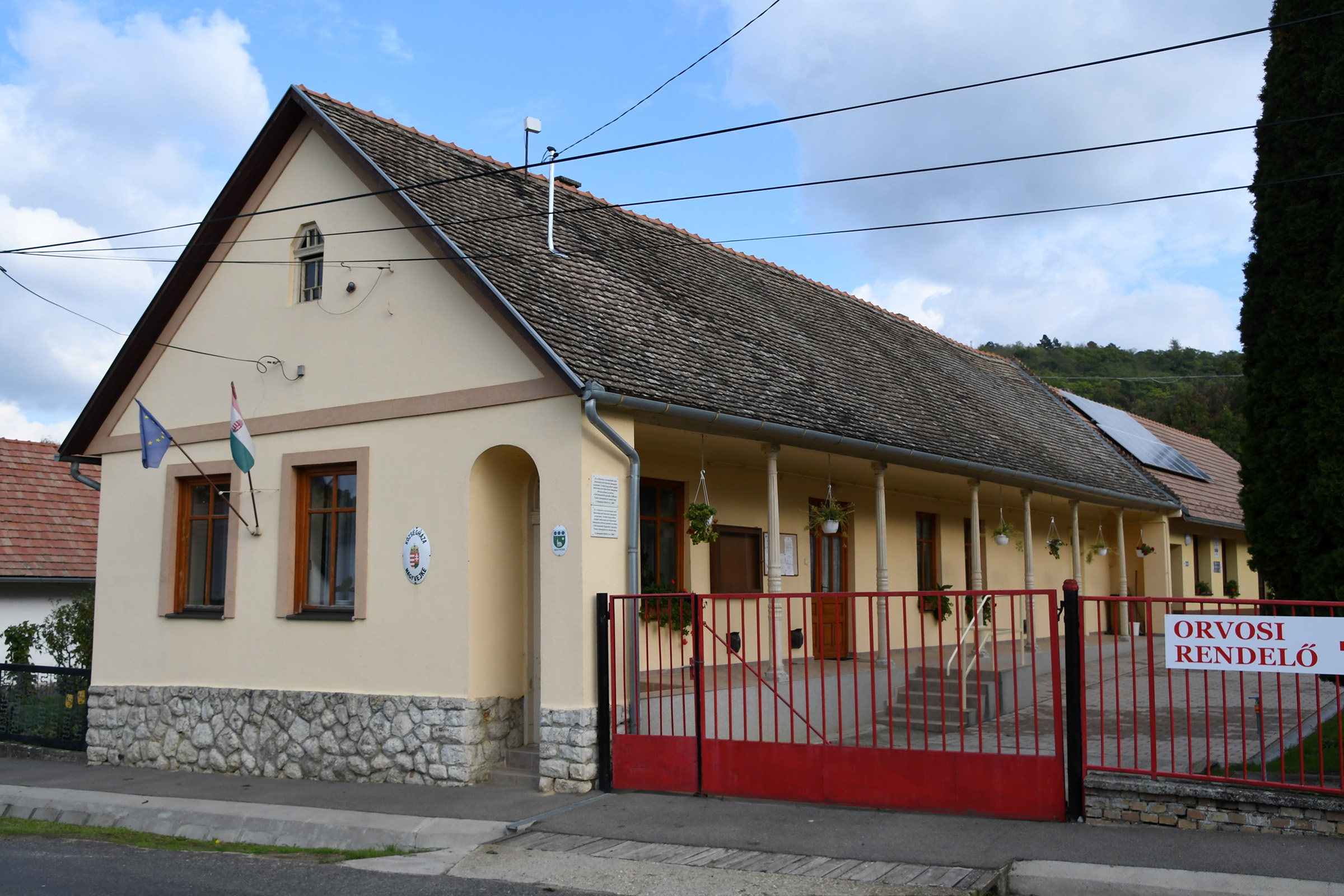
- Village hall

- Location of Tolna county in Hungary

- Location of Nagyvejke
- Coordinates: 46.37669°N 18.44525°E
- Country: Hungary
- County: Tolna

Area
  - Total: 7.77 km^{2} (3.00 sq mi)

Population (2004)
  - Total: 197
  - Density: 25.35/km^{2} (65.7/sq mi)
- Time zone: UTC+1 (CET)
  - Summer (DST): UTC+2 (CEST)
- Postal code: 7186
- Area code: 74

Nagyvejke is a village in Tolna County, Hungary.
