= Mucsfa =

- Location of Tolna county in Hungary

- Location of Mucsfa
- Coordinates: 46.35569°N 18.41773°E
- Country: Hungary
- County: Tolna

Area
  - Total: 12.75 km^{2} (4.92 sq mi)

Population (2004)
  - Total: 417
  - Density: 32.7/km^{2} (85/sq mi)
- Time zone: UTC+1 (CET)
  - Summer (DST): UTC+2 (CEST)
- Postal code: 7185
- Area code: 74

Mucsfa is a village in Tolna County, Hungary.
