= Mórágy =

Mórágy Maratz
- Location of Tolna county in Hungary

- Location within Hungary
- Coordinates: 46°12′57″N 18°38′35″E
- Country: Hungary
- County: Tolna

Area
  - Total: 17.6 km^{2} (6.8 sq mi)

Population (2011)
  - Total: 720
  - Density: 41/km^{2} (110/sq mi)
- Time zone: UTC+1 (CET)
  - Summer (DST): UTC+2 (CEST)
- Postal code: 7165
- Area code: 74
- Website: www.moragy.hu

Mórágy (German: Maratz) is a village in Tolna County, Hungary.
