= Bonyhád =

Bonyhád Bonnhard
- Town
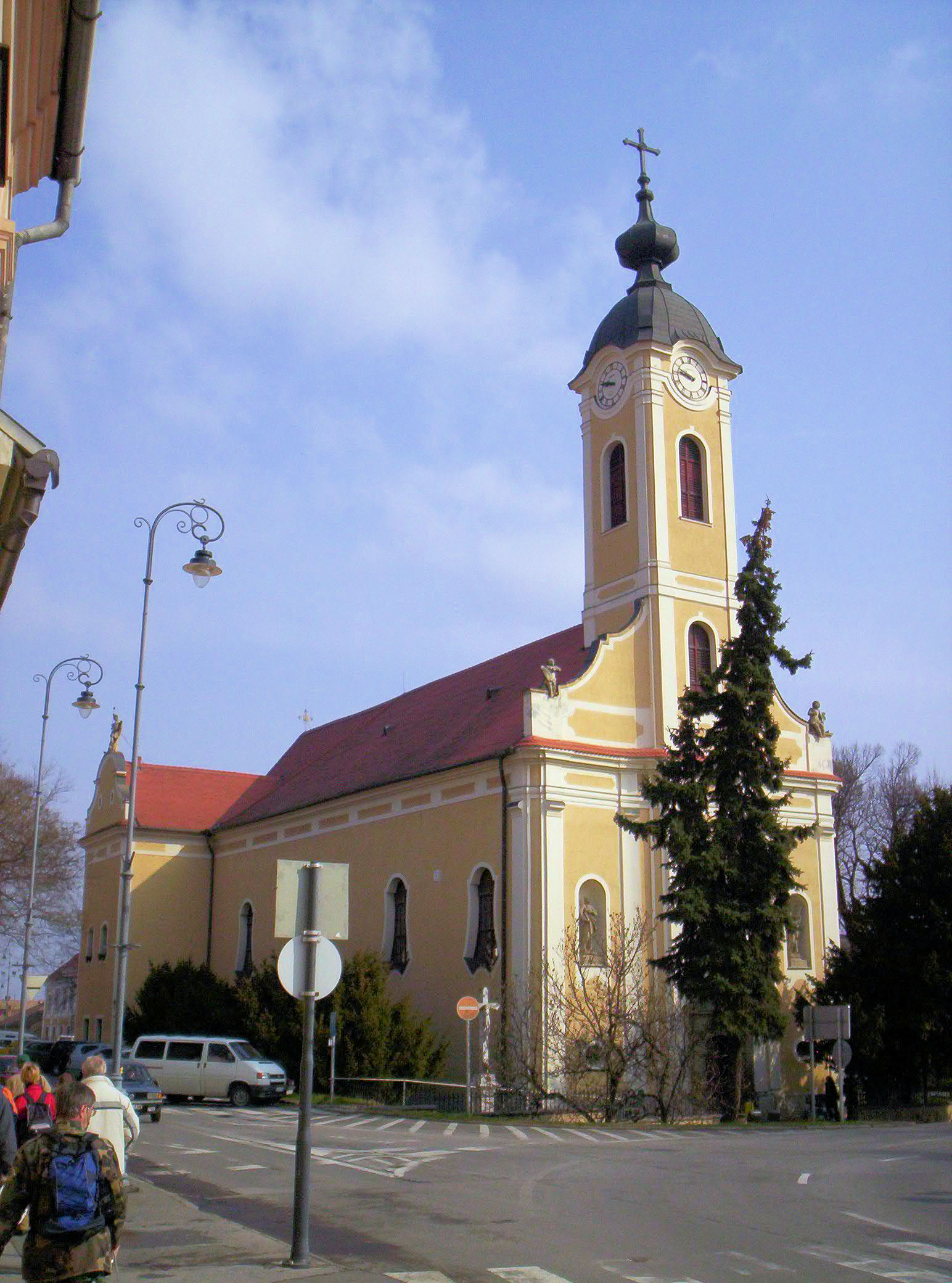
- Immaculate Conception Church

- Flag Coat of arms

- Location of Bonyhád
- Coordinates: 46.30056°N 18.53092°E
- Country: Hungary
- County: Tolna
- District: Bonyhád

Area
  - Total: 72.14 km^{2} (27.85 sq mi)

Population (2022)
  - Total: 12,173
  - Density: 168.7/km^{2} (437.0/sq mi)
- Time zone: UTC+1 (CET)
  - Summer (DST): UTC+2 (CEST)
- Postal code: 7150
- Area code: (+36) 74
- Website: www.bonyhad.hu

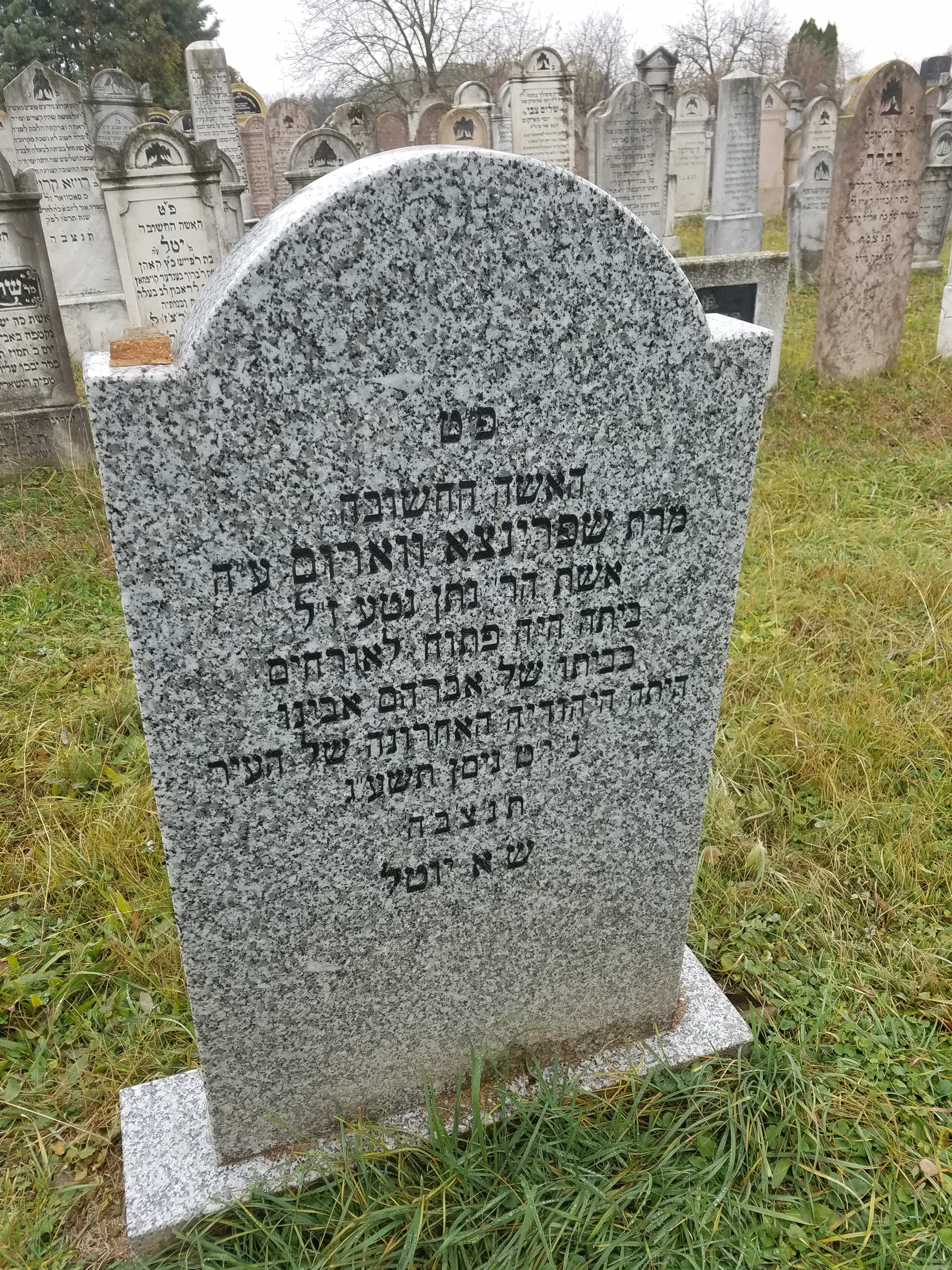
Gravestone of Sari Warum, Bonyhad's last Jewish resident

Bonyhád (German: Bonnhard) is a town in Tolna County in Southwestern Hungary.

== History ==
The area around Bonyhád has been inhabited since ancient times, primarily by Celts. The modern town can trace its history back to 14th century. The town was briefly uninhabited during the Ottoman occupation. A gothic church once stood in the town, but it was destroyed by Ottoman forces in 1542.

The town was granted market town status in 1782. Since its founding, the town was inhabited by a mix of Hungarians and Serbs, who were later joined by Germans and Jews. This meant the town became home to Roman Catholic, Lutheran, Reformed, and Jewish communities.

During the Interwar Period, Bonyhád became the focal point of a heated fight between Germans seeking minority rights, and the Hungarian government which was invested in their assimilation. The town being a flashpoint for German minority rights, may of the towns Germans joined the Nazi-affiliated Volksbund, and a large celebration for Hitler's birthday was organized in Bonyhád with the German ambassador in attendance. At this time, Bonyhád also had a sizeable Jewish population. In 1941, Jews constituted approximately 14% of the total population. The community was divided between Orthodox and Neolog Judaism traditions.

After the occupation of Hungary by the German army in March 1944, the town's remaining Jewish citizens were isolated, and their property was confiscated by the Hungarian authorities. In May 1944, the Jewish population was estimated at around 1,300. Between May 12–15, 1944 the Jewish communities in Bonyhád, Bátaszék, Szekszárd and the surrounding villages were moved into two ghettos in Bonyhád. Some Jews were tortured to find out where they may have placed valuables. On July 1, 1944 the population of the two ghettos were transported by train to the Lakitcs military barracks in the nearby city of Pécs. From there, on June 9, 1944, the Jews were deported to Auschwitz, where most were murdered upon arrival.

Bonyhád was captured and occupied on 30 November 1944 by Soviet troops of the 3rd Ukrainian Front in the course of the Budapest Offensive. After the war, Allied Powers confiscated the property and lands of the town's German minority, who were subsequently deported en masse. Székely Hungarians were brought in from Transylvania to replace the deported population. A small number of Jews returned to the town, and made an effort to reestablish the Orthodox and Neologue communities in Bonyhád.

Following the 1956 Revolution most of Bonyhád's Jews left Hungary and settled in North America and Israel. By 1963 there were only 4 Jewish families left in the town. Bonyhád's last Jewish resident, Ms. Sári (Kaufman) Warum, died in April 2013. She was a survivor of Auschwitz.

== Demographics ==
As of the 2011 census, the town is 87.4% Hungarian, 15% German, and 2.7% Gypsy. The inhabitants are 54.6% Roman Catholic, 6% Lutheran, 3.5% Reformed, and 12.3% non-denominational.

== Government ==
Bonyhád is governed by a city council and a mayor. The current mayor is Filóné Ferencz Ibolya who has served in this capacity since 2014.

== Facilities ==
Bonyhád is home to the Völgység Museum. The town's population is served by a Roman Catholic church and a Lutheran church. The remains of the town's two Synagogues are still visible. There are nine cemeteries, including an Orthodox and the Neologue Jewish cemetery. Various sporting facilities and three high school/college compounds (e.g. Petőfi Sándor Evangélikus Gimnázium, Perczel Mór Szakközépiskola) along with the City Hospital currently serve the residents. Telephone service is provided by Bonicom Kft. Gas service is provided by Futomu Kft and water by Vizmu Reszleg.

== Sport ==
- Bonyhád VLC

== Twin towns – sister cities ==
Bonyhád is twinned with:

- Borsec, Romania
- Jastrowie, Poland
- Pančevo, Serbia
- Siculeni, Romania
- Treuchtlingen, Germany
- Tvrdošovce, Slovakia
- Wernau, Germany
