= Alsónána =

- Coat of arms

- Location of Alsónána in Hungary
- Coordinates: 46.24841°N 18.65981°E
- Country: Hungary
- Region: Southern Transdanubia
- County: Tolna
- Subregion: Szekszárdi
- Rank: Village

Government
  - Mayor: Czifra Ferenc

Area
  - Total: 13.13 km^{2} (5.07 sq mi)

Population (1 January 2008)
  - Total: 708
  - Density: 53.9/km^{2} (140/sq mi)
- Time zone: UTC+1 (CET)
  - Summer (DST): UTC+2 (CEST)
- Postal code: 7147
- Area code: +36 74
- KSH code: 29665
- Website: www.alsonana.hu

Alsónána (Serbian: Доња Нана, romanized: Donja Nana) is a village in Tolna County, Hungary. Residents are Magyars, with minority of Serbs.
