= Závod, Hungary =

Závod
- Location of Závod, Hungary
- Coordinates: 46.39375°N 18.41498°E
- Country: Hungary
- County: Tolna

Area
  - Total: 12.91 km^{2} (4.98 sq mi)

Population (2019)
  - Total: 310
  - Density: 26.72/km^{2} (69.2/sq mi)
- Time zone: UTC+1 (CET)
  - Summer (DST): UTC+2 (CEST)
- Postal code: 7182
- Area code: 74

Závod (German: Seiwicht) is a village in Tolna County, Hungary.

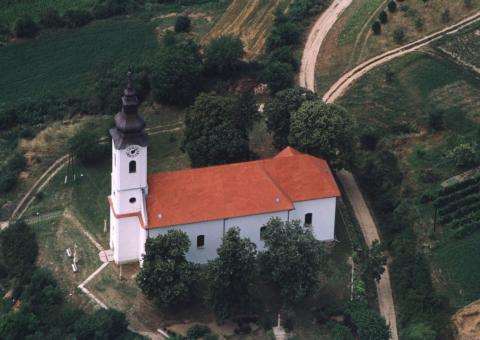
Aerial photography of a church in Závod

Until the end of World War II, the inhabitants were Roman Catholic Danube Swabians, also called locally as Stifulder, because the majority of their ancestors arrived during the 17th and 18th centuries from Fulda (district). Most of the former German settlers were expelled to allied-occupied Germany and allied-occupied Austria in 1945–1948, following the Potsdam Agreement. Only a few Germans of Hungary live there, the majority today are the descendants of Hungarians from the Czechoslovak–Hungarian population exchange. They occupied the houses of the former Danube Swabian inhabitants. The Stifolder or Stiffoller are a Roman Catholic Subgroup of the Danube Swabians. Their ancestors once came ca. 1717 - 1804 from the Hochstift Fulda and surroundings, (Roman Catholic Diocese of Fulda), and settled in the Baranya and in Tolna. They retained their own German Stiffolerisch Schvovish dialect and culture, until the end of WW2. Also a salami is named after these people.
