= Mőcsény =

- Coat of arms

- Location within Hungary
- Coordinates: 46°15′28″N 18°35′23″E
- Country: Hungary
- County: Tolna

Area
  - Total: 12.1 km^{2} (4.7 sq mi)

Population (2025)
  - Total: 340
  - Density: 28/km^{2} (73/sq mi)
- Time zone: UTC+1 (CET)
  - Summer (DST): UTC+2 (CEST)
- Postal code: 7163
- Area code: 74

Mőcsény is a village in Tolna county, Hungary.
