= Hungarian Central Statistical Office =

Body in charge of statistics and census data

Coordinates: 47.5115°N 19.0311°E

- Központi Statisztikai Hivatal (KSH)

Agency overview
- Formed: 18 April 1871 (155 years ago)
- Jurisdiction: Government of Hungary
- Headquarters: 5-7 Keleti Károly Street Budapest, 1024
- Minister responsible: Gábor Pósfai, Hungarian Interior Minister
- Agency executive: Áron Kincses
- Parent agency: Ministry of Interior
- Website: www.ksh.hu

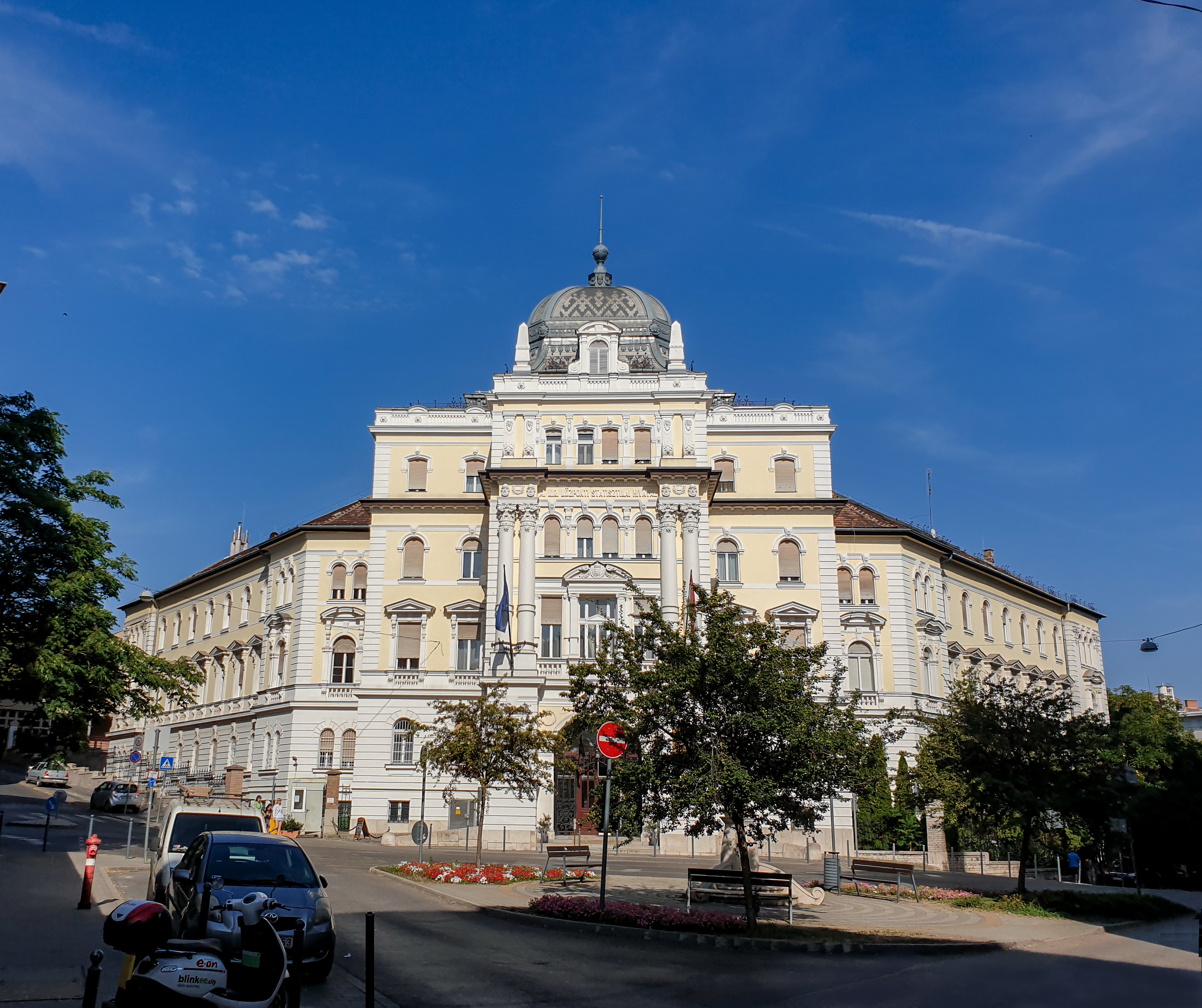
The Central Statistical Office main building in Keleti Károly Street, Budapest

The Hungarian Central Statistical Office (HSCO; Hungarian: Központi Statisztikai Hivatal (KSH), Hungarian pronunciation: [ˈkøsponti ʃtɒtistikɒji hivɒtɒl]) is a quango responsible for collecting, processing and publishing statistics about Hungary, its economy, and its inhabitants. The office provides details for parliamentary and administrative offices, local councils and academia, financial institutions, the public at large and the media.

== Functions ==
- To devise and conduct surveys
- To demand collection of statistical data for the central state statistical system
- To process and analyse information from the collection of statistical data based on compulsory and voluntary data supply
- To supply data and analysis for state organizations
- To satisfy requests from non-governmental organisations, parties, local government, academic researchers and the general public
- To prepare and make the census and to process and publish the data from it.

== Regulation ==
Legal reference: KSH - Rules on Statistics

- Organization of National Statistics Act No. XXV of 1874
- Hungarian Royal Central Statistical Office Act No XXXV of 1897
- Official Statistical Service Act No XIX of 1929
- State Statistics Act No VI. of 1952
- Statistics Act No. V. of 1973
- Statistics Act No. XLVI of 1993

The organisation is also covered by European Union regulation.

== Organization structure ==
There are around 1,050 people employed at the central office, with a further 450 at regional offices.

The head of the Office is called the President, and leads a number of organizational units each headed by a Deputy President and having several departments:

- Departments reporting directly to the president
  - Internal Audit Section
  - Administration and International
- Departments reporting to the Deputy President responsible for statistical issues
  - Price Statistics
  - Living Standards and Labour Statistics
  - Foreign Trade Statistics
  - Agriculture and Environment Statistics
  - National Accounts
  - Population Statistics
  - Statistical Research and Methodology Department
  - Sector Accounts
  - Services Statistics
  - Social Services Statistics
  - Business Statistics
- Departments reporting to the Deputy President responsible for economic affairs
  - Financial Management
  - Technical and System Monitoring
  - Information Technology
  - Dissemination
  - Planning
  - Directorates
    - Debrecen
    - Győr
    - Miskolc
    - Pécs
    - Szeged
    - Veszprém

== See also ==
- Demographics of Hungary
