= János Garay =

Hungarian poet (1812–1853)

- Born: October 10, 1812; Szekszárd, Kingdom of Hungary, Austrian Empire
- Died: November 5, 1853; Pest, Kingdom of Hungary, Austrian Empire
- Writing career
- Language: Hungarian

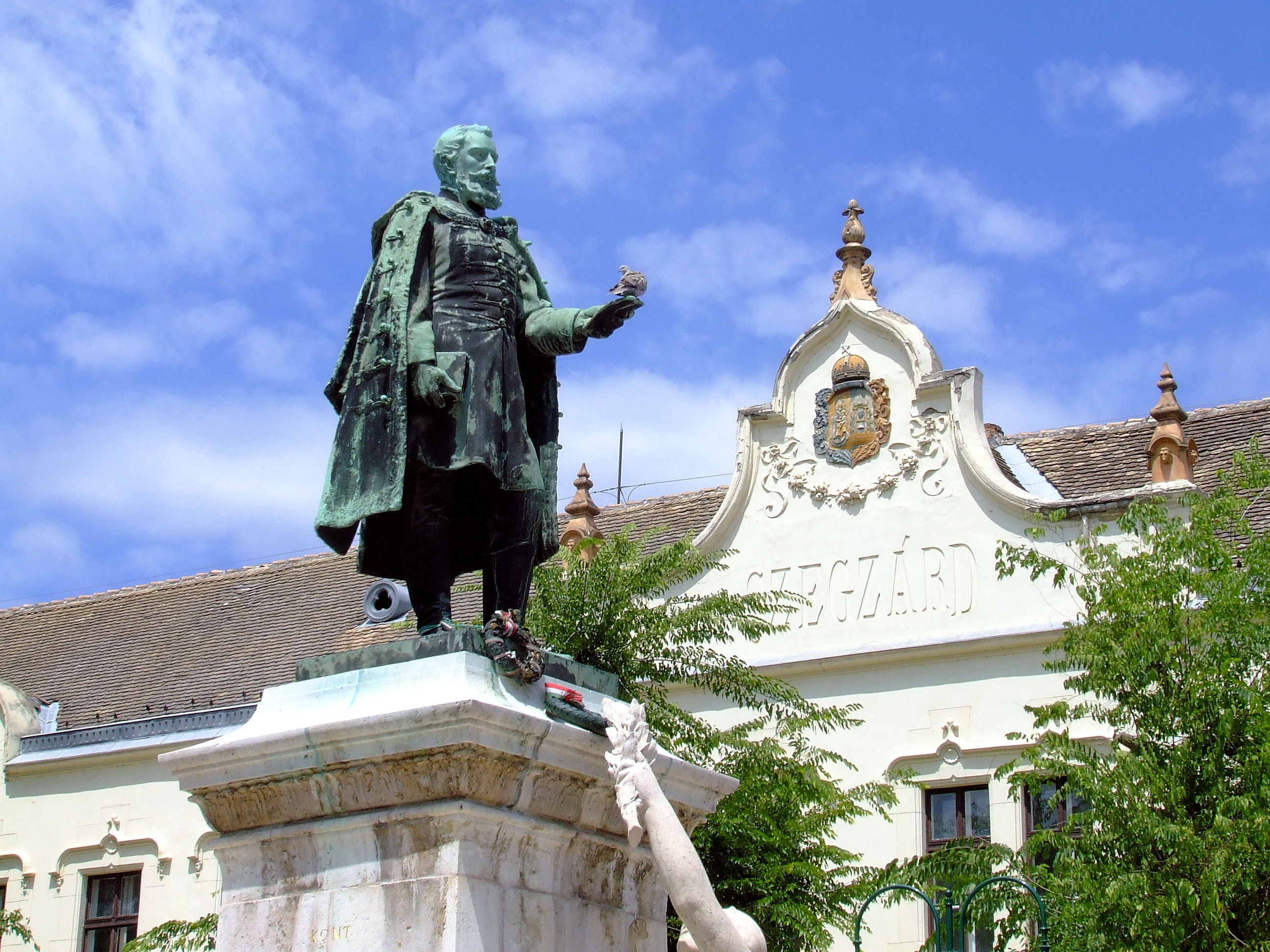
Statue of János Garay in Szekszárd

János Garay (10 October 1812 – 5 November 1853) was a Hungarian poet and author, born in Szekszárd, Tolna County. From 1823 to 1828 he studied at Pécs, and subsequently, in 1829, at the University of Pest. In 1834 he brought out an heroic poem, in hexameters, under the title Csatár. Garay was an energetic journalist, and in 1838 he moved to Pozsony, where he edited the political journal Hírnök (Herald). He returned to Pest in 1839, when he was elected a corresponding member of the Hungarian Academy of Sciences. In 1842 he was admitted into the Kisfaludy Society, of which he became second secretary.

Garay enriched Hungarian literature with numerous lyrical poems, ballads and tales. The first collection of his poems was published in Pest; and his prose tales appeared in 1845, under the title of Tollrajzok (Sketches with the Pen). His historical ballads and legends, styled Árpádok (Pest, 1847, 2nd ed. 1848), showed him to be a master in the art of ballad-writing. Some of his lyrical poems also are excellent, as, for example, Balatoni kagylók (Shells from Lake Balaton) (Pest, 1848). His legend Bosnyák Zsófia (Pest, 1847), and his poetical romance Frangepán Kristófné (Christopher Frangepan's Wife) (Pest, 1846), gained the prize of the Kisfaludy Society.

He wrote the comic poem Az obsitos (The Veteran) about the self-prolaimed hero Háry János, with whom Garay was personally acquainted. Zsolt Harsányi (1887–1943) and Béla Paulini (1881–1945) adapted the poem into a Singspiel libretto, which was set to music by Zoltán Kodály in his 1926 folk opera Háry János.

His last and most famous work was an historical poem in twelve cantos, with the title Szent László (Saint Ladislaus) (Eger, 1852, 2nd ed., Pest, 1853, 3rd ed. 1863).

Garay was professor of Hungarian language and literature to the University of Pest in 1848–1849. Since he was frail he supported the 1848 Revolution for freedom through his poetry. When the Revolutionaries lost he was condemned by the Habsburgs. After about four years illness he died in 1853, in great want. A collected edition of his poems was published in Pest the year after his death by F. Ney (2nd ed. 1860), and several of his poems were translated by Kertbeny. His birthplace of Szekszárd has a statue to honor him.
