= Sarolta Péczely =

Sarolta Péczely Kodály (born 5 November 1940) is a Hungarian singer and associate professor. She was the second wife of composer Zoltán Kodály from 1959 until his death in 1967.

== Biography ==
Sarolta Péczely was born in Dombóvár on 5 November 1940. Her father, László Péczely, was a literary scholar and a teacher at the Royal Catholic Esterházy Miklós Nádor High School in Dombóvár.

At the age of five, she won a folk song singing competition in her hometown. This was where she first met Zoltán Kodály, who was staying in Dombóvár between 23 November 1945 and 8 January 1946.

She completed her primary schooling in Dombóvár at the St. Ursula Order's educational institution, then completed secondary school in Pécs, graduating in 1958. Wishing to continue her studies in Budapest, she was admitted to the Franz Liszt Academy of Music, where she studied singing and choral conducting under Ilona Andor. Her father, who knew Kodály personally, asked the composer for help in obtaining student accommodation in the capital.

Kodály had lost his first wife, Emma Sándor, on 22 November 1958. After a year of mourning, on 18 December 1959, the 77-year-old composer married Péczely, who was 19 at the time. Kodály died in 1967 at the age of 84.

Sarolta Péczely Kodály studied in Berlin between 1970 and 1980 at the Hanns Eisler School of Music as a student of Dagmar Freiwald-Lange. Later, she taught at the University of Theatre and Film Arts and at the Franz Liszt Academy of Music, attaining the title of associate professor. She has regularly held master classes and recitals in Japan, Germany, Italy, Finland, and the United States, in addition to Hungary.

== Memberships ==
- Honorary President of the International Kodály Society
- Honorary Doctorate of the University of Jyväskylä

=== Founding member ===
- Zoltán Kodály Music Pedagogy Institute, Kecskemét
- Zoltán Kodály Memorial Museum and Archive, Budapest

== Awards and recognitions ==
- Recipient of the Order of the White Rose of Finland
- Pro Urbe award (Kecskemét and Budapest)
- Honorary citizen of Dombóvár (2018)
- Knight of Hungarian Culture (2016)
- Middle Cross of the Hungarian Order of Merit (2013)
