= Mórocz =

Hungarian noble family

- Parent family: The Abony clan
- Country: Kingdom of Hungary; The Habsburg monarchy
- Founded: 15th century
- Founder: Benedict Mórocz, son of Maurice (Mauricius) de Nagyabony
- Titles: chevalier (vitéz), baron
- Cadet branches: de Nagyabony, de Beketfalva

The Mórocz family, also known as Mórócz, is an old Hungarian noble family from the northern part of the Kingdom of Hungary (today's southwest Slovakia). Several members of the family held significant positions in the Habsburg monarchy.

== History ==
The origin of the Mórocz family is unclear. Historians try to attribute Czech roots to them. In the 12th century, Czech invaders arrived in Hungary and acquired from King Stephen III. the land called "Abony" (Fel-Abony, Nagyabony, Velke Blahovo) in the northern part of the Kingdom of Hungary (today's southwestern Slovakia). The monarch gave it to them. Their first known ancestor was Mauricio (Moricz) son of Michael of Velke Blahovo (de Nagyabony), who lived in the 15th century and had estates in this noble village. Mauricio had a son, Benedict, who was the first to use the surname "Morocz" derived from his father's first name. Historical sources state his full name as "nobilis Benedictus Morocz de Naghaban". Benedict is considered to be the first Mórocz of Velke Blahovo.

The Mórocz family was split to two branch:

- Mórocz de Nagyabony (the medieval branch)
- Mórocz de Beketfalva (the prestigue branch)

The Mórocz family were consistently loyal to the Habsburg monarchs.

Antonius and his father Petrus received a coat of arms and title from Maximilián II in 1572 for faithful service. Since 1578 they have been the owners of a property in Beketfalva and the full surname of the family became Mórocz de Beketfalva. Beketfalva being a small village east of Bratislava (Hungarian: Pozsony, German: Pressburg), now capital of Slovakia. Antonius's wife was Anna Bessenyei de Galántha, the sister of Ilona Bessenyei de Galántha, the wife of Benedict Zerhas de Zerhashaz.

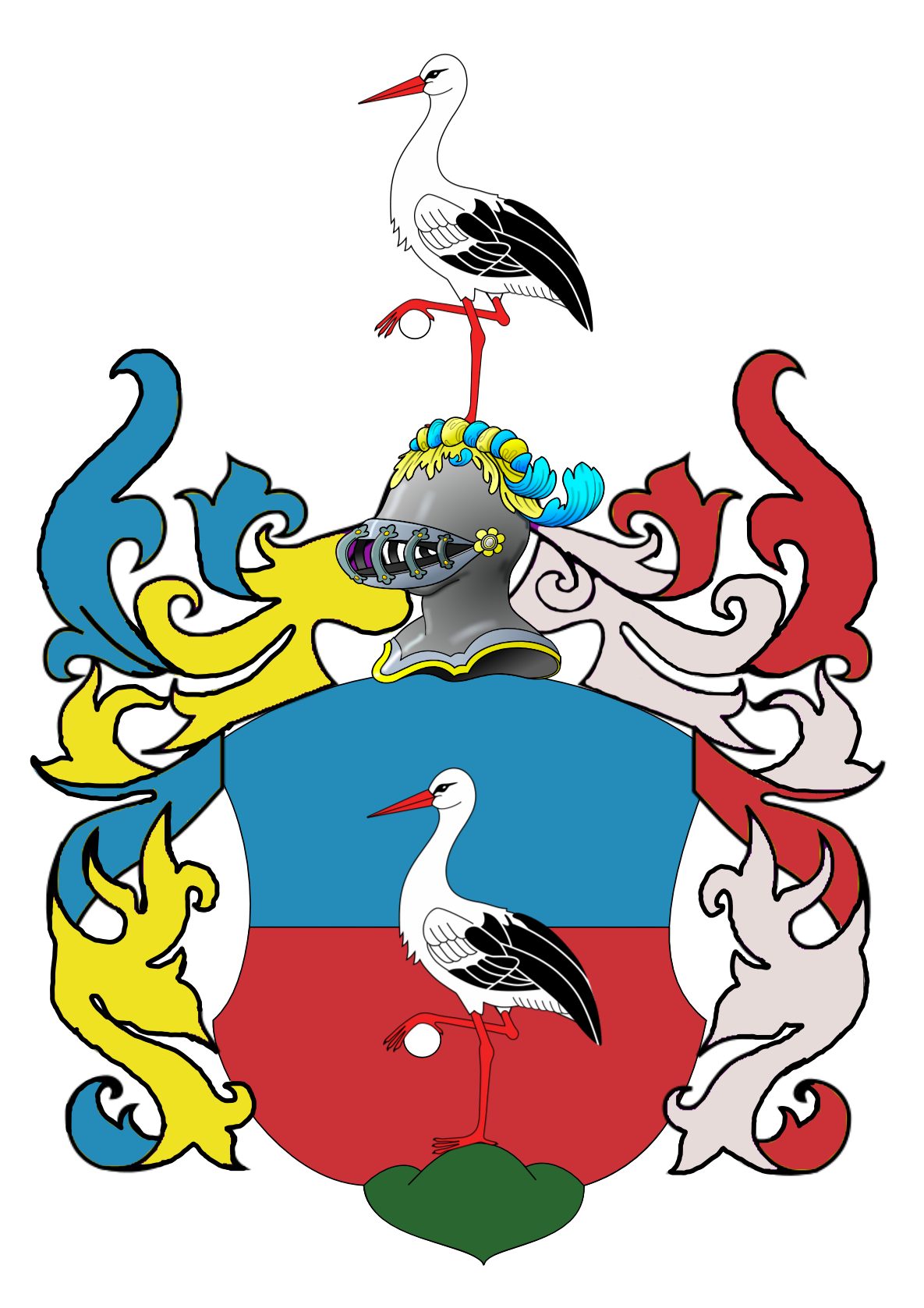
The Mórocz de Beketfalva the coat of arms from the 16th century

The family rose to prominence under Wolfgang Mórocz (1575–1648). During his rich career, Wolfgang was a sub-prefect of the Pressburg region, a councilor of the Hungarian Chamber, a regional sub-judge and a Hungarian vicepalatine. Nicolaus Eszterházy was Wolfgang's patron until his death in 1645. The Eszterházy family was the patron family of Mórocz family.

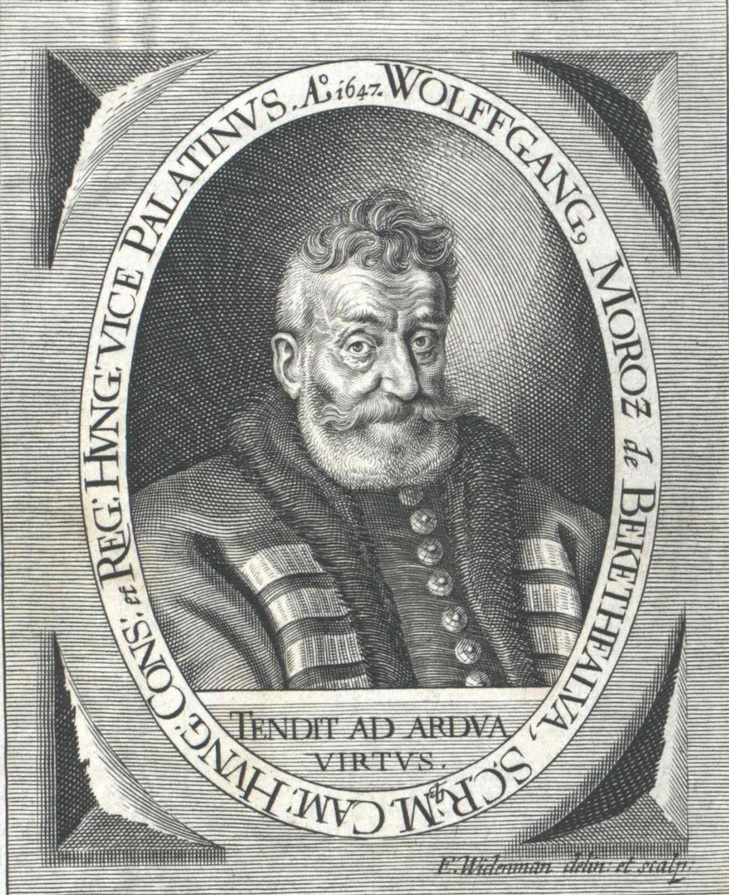
Wolfgang Mórocz (1575–1648), vicepalatine of Hungary

The Mórocz de Beketfalva branch separated from the original Nagyabony line during the 16th century, establishing its own ancestral seat and estates in Beketfalva. The Nagyabony branch of the Mórocz family represents an ancient medieval landowning gentry (nobiles possessionati) that successfully maintained its sovereign status into the modern era. As co-lords (nagyabonyi közbirtokosok) of their ancestral seat, they exercised full authority over their hereditary lands. On June 4, 1641, the monarch Ferdinand III granted a new property donation (Donatio nova) in Nagyabony (lat. processus inferior insulanus) to Ambróz (Ambrosius) Mórocz, the primary co-lord and donator.

This status of rooted nobility (tősgyökeres nemesek) and the continuous ownership of the family estates were definitively confirmed in 1718 by King Charles III. He issued a Letter of Protection (Salva Guardia), which legally shielded the family’s ancestral lands from confiscation and recognized them as long-established settlers of the region.

Heraldry and Branch Differentiation

The family's identity is reflected in two distinct heraldic traditions:

The Ambróz Branch (Donators): This line utilized the ancient version of the coat of arms, featuring an armored arm holding a saber, accompanied by a star and a crescent moon. Its distinguishing crest consists of eagle wings, declaring the family's ancient noble standing.

The Michal Branch (1651): This line used the arms granted by Ferdinand III for military valor. The shield features a knight with a sword, while the crest shows an armored arm with a saber, also accompanied by a moon and a star.

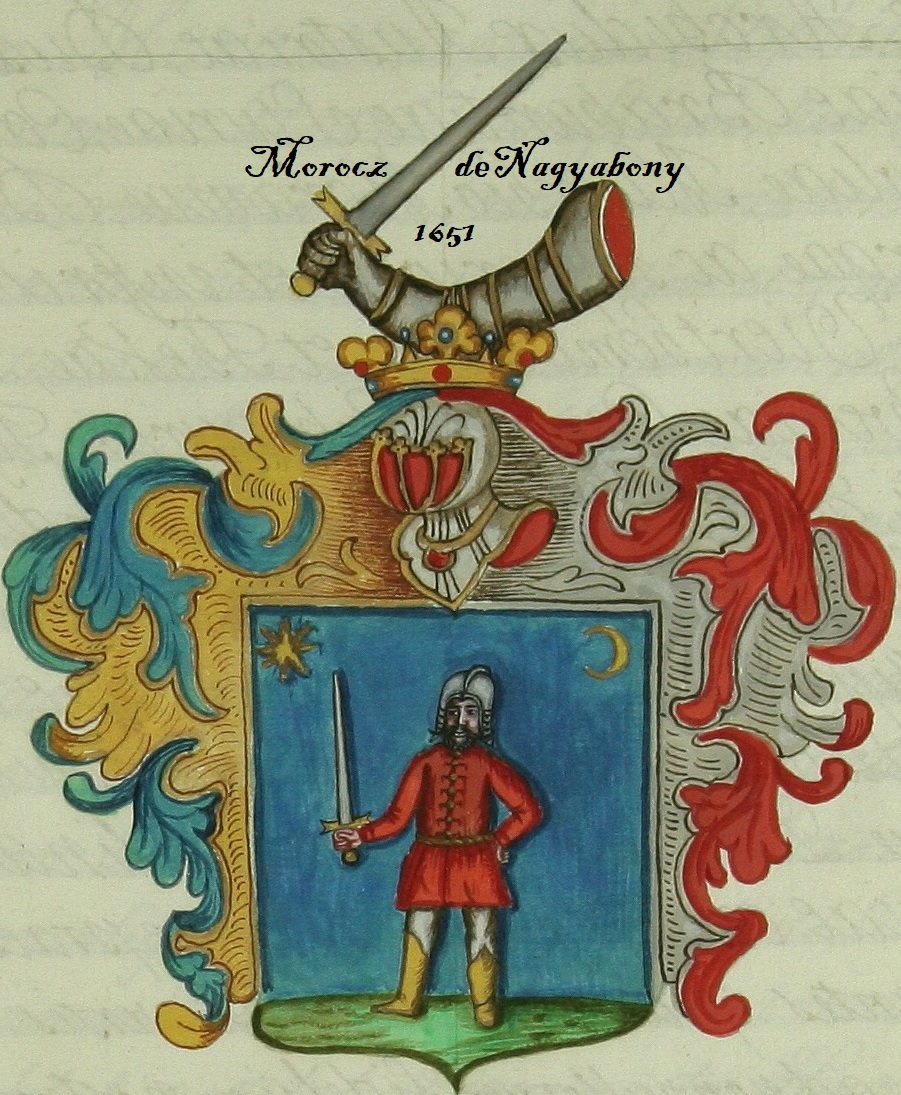
The Mórocz de Nagyabony the coat of arms from the 17th century

The Eperjes (Jahodná) Branch

At the beginning of the 18th century, a branch of the family settled in the village of Eperjes (today Pozsonyeperjes/Jahodná). This line maintained close blood and property ties with the ancestral seat in Nagyabony. In May 1823, a formal investigation of nobility took place, where relatives from Nagyabony officially testified to the lineage of their Eperjes kinsmen. Based on this investigation, the authorities officially recognized the Eperjes branch's right to the historic predicate "de Nagyabony".

== Notable members ==
- Benedict (hu. Benedek) de Nagyabony (14th-15th century), Landowner of village by name Nagyabony, the first to use the surname "Morocz"
- Ambróz (Ambrosius) Mórocz de Nagyabony, the 1641 donator, co-owner and lord of Nagyabony
- Wolfgang (hu. Farkas) Mórocz de Beketfalva (1575 – 1648), Vicepalatine of Hungary, Sub-prefect of Bratislava capital
- Stephanus (hu. István) Mórocz de Beketfalva (1600/1610–1683) sub-prefect of Bratislava capital, Deputy regional judge and Member of the royal court, husband of baroness Susan Amáde de Wárkony
- baron Emercius (hu. Imré) Mórocz de Beketfalva (1699–1758), Imperial sub-marshal, Owner of the hussar regiment. He became famous in the Battle of Cologne in 1757
- Karl (hu. Károly) Mórocz de Beketfalva (1700/1720 – † 1795), Hussar major. He became famous in the Napoleonic wars
- chevalier Andreas (hu. András) Mórocz de Nagyabony (1891–1958), Hero of WWI, Commander of the attack unit. He became famous in the Battle of Jagodina in 1914. He was knighted, Member of The Order of Vitéz.
