= Háry János =

Opera by Zoltán Kodály

- Folk opera by Zoltán Kodály
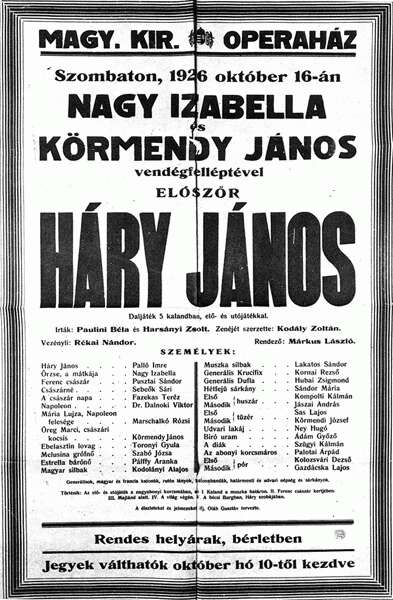
- Librettist: Béla Paulini; Zsolt Harsányi
- Language: Hungarian
- Based on: The Veteran by János Garay
- Premiere: 16 October 1926; Royal Hungarian Opera House, Budapest

Háry János is a Hungarian folk opera in four acts by Zoltán Kodály with a libretto by Béla Paulini and Zsolt Harsányi. The opera is in the Singspiel style. The libretto is based on János Garay's comic poem "The Veteran" (Az obsitos) about a drunkard named Háry János. The subtitle of the piece is Háry János Kalandozásai Nagyabonytul a Burgváráig – Háry János: his Adventures from Nagyabony (Great Abony) to the Vienna Burg.

The première was at the Royal Hungarian Opera House in Budapest on 16 October 1926, conducted by Nándor Rékai. The UK stage première was at the Buxton Festival in 1982 conducted by Anthony Hose, with Alan Opie in the title role.

== Background ==
Háry János is a veteran hussar of the Austrian army in the first half of the 19th century who sits in the village inn regaling his listeners with fantastic tales of heroism. The character is in the tradition of Plautus' Miles Gloriosus and Baron Munchausen. Háry János may have been a real person with whom János Garay was personally acquainted. His supposed exploits include winning the heart of the Empress Marie Louise, the wife of Napoleon, and then single-handedly defeating Napoleon and his armies. Nevertheless, he finally renounces all riches in order to go back to his village with his sweetheart. Háry János is often seen as Kodály's alter-ego.

Kodály wrote in his preface to the score: "Háry is a peasant, a veteran soldier who day after day sits at the tavern spinning yarns about his heroic exploits... the stories released by his imagination are an inextricable mixture of realism and naivety, of comic humour and pathos." He also comments that "though superficially he appears to be merely a braggart, essentially he is a natural visionary and poet. That his stories are not true is irrelevant, for they are the fruit of a lively imagination, seeking to create, for himself and for others, a beautiful dream world." Háry János embodies the poetic power of folklore to go beyond political frustrations; Kodály intended to bring his national folk music to an operatic setting.

Both the opera and the suite taken from it (see below) begin with an orchestral 'musical sneeze', best explained in Kodály's own words: "According to Hungarian superstition, if a statement is followed by a sneeze of one of the hearers, it is regarded as confirmation of its truth. The Suite begins with a sneeze of this kind! One of Háry's group of faithful listeners … sneezes at the wildest assertions of the old tale-spinner."

At the request of the Universal publishing house in Vienna, Kodály himself described the message behind Háry János: "Every Hungarian is a dreamer. He flees from the sad reality of the centuries...into the world of illusions. Yet Háry János's boasting is more than a dream: it is also poetry. The authors of heroic tales are themselves no heroes, but they are the spiritual kin of heroes. Háry János may never have done the deeds he talks about, but the potential is always there. János is a primitive poet, and what he has to say he concentrates in a single hero: himself. After we have listened to the heroic feats he has dreamed up, it is tragically symbolic that we see him in a grubby village inn. He appears happy in his poverty: a king in the kingdom of his dreams."

== Roles ==
Role	Voice type	Premiere cast, 16 October 1926 (Conductor: Nándor Rékai)
Háry János	baritone	Imre Palló
Örzse, his betrothed	mezzo-soprano	Izabella Nagy
Empress of Austria	soprano	Sári Sebeök
Napóleon	baritone	Viktor Dalnoki
Mária Lujza, wife of Napóleon	mezzo-soprano	Rózsi Marschalkó
Öreg Marci, emperor’s coachman	baritone	János Körmendy
Knight Ebelasztin, chamberlain to the Empress Mária Lujza	tenor	Gyula Toronyi
Emperor Franz	spoken	Sándor Pusztai
Emperor's mother-in-law	spoken	Teréz Fazekas
Countess Melusina	spoken	Józsa Szabó
Baroness Estrella	spoken	Aranka Pállfy
General Krucifix	spoken	Rezsö Kornai
General Dufla	spoken	Zsigmond Hubai
A student	spoken	Kalmán Szügyi
Abraham, an innkeeper	spoken	
Hungarian sentry	spoken	
Russian sentry	spoken	
Village elder	spoken	
Generals, French and Hungarian soldiers, people at the borders and at court

== Synopsis ==
Overture

Prologue – The Tale Begins

In the Hungarian village of Nagyabony people gather at the tavern. A picture of Napoleon hangs on the wall. The regulars and students wait glass in hand for the next tale from the old soldier Háry János.

First Adventure – On the frontier near Moscow

A border crossing point between Galicia and Russia; there is frost and ice on the Russian side, sun shining and flowers blooming on the Hungarian side. János, after having got rid of all his female admirers meets Örzse.

The court chamberlain complains that Mária Lujza and her retinue have not been able to cross the frontier. Örzse and János talk with Marci, a Hungarian coachman working at the French Court, who tells them that Mária Lujza, the daughter of the Emperor, is being refused passage by the Russian guard. János pushes the border gate along the ground, so that she finds herself across the Hungarian frontier. Marci toasts the young couple as Örzse and János sing a duet. Ebelasztin says the noise is disturbing the rest of the princess. However, when Mária Lujza enters she takes a fancy to János and invites him to come to Vienna and enter the Imperial Guard. He asks for double rations for his horse, Hungarian livery for Marci, and for Örzse to come with him. The Russian sentry is worried that he will be punished if he is found in the wrong country. Ebelasztin fails to push the frontier post back, but János manages to do it.

Intermezzo

Second Adventure – In the Garden of the Imperial Palace, Vienna Burg

The park is resplendent. In the course of conversation between János and Marci Ebelasztin's dislike of János becomes clear. Mária Lujza tells János to seek her if he ever needs assistance. Ebelasztin sends János to the stables where he has to ride the wildest horse, but János returns from the roof unruffled by the ride. Mária Lujza points out János to the Empress. The envious Ebelasztin tells Örzse that he has in his pocket the declaration of war from Napoleon which he intends to use; moments later military sounds emerge from inside the palace. János has been promoted to captain by the Emperor. As the curtain falls an enormous cannon is wheeled on.

Third Adventure – A battlefield near Milan.

Háry János, by now promoted to the rank of colonel, single-handedly wins the battle with the wind from drawing his sword, and has Napoleon kneeling for mercy. The emperor's wife now wants to win his heart, to the consternation of Örzse. Mária Lujza and Örzse argue over János, who refuses to marry the princess, who herself threatens suicide. János saves the situation and leads the soldiers in a rousing march.

Fourth Adventure – Imperial Palace, Vienna Burg.

The preparations for the wedding of the hero János and the infatuated princess are under way, but János can't eat. All the archdukes come and pay homage to the hero. Örzse arrives to take leave of Háry but, now an infantryman, he swears allegiance to the Emperor, whether as a soldier or farmer. True to her and to his homeland, despite all the imperial trappings they leave the court.

Epilogue

Back at the inn in Nagyabony, János concludes by telling his sleeping audience that the condition of freeing Napoleon was that a gold watch should be sent to the headman of the village, who replies that he never got it. János states that the only person who can corroborate his story is Örzse, who is now dead.

== Musical numbers ==
- (A 'Theatre Overture' (Színházi nyitány, K.13) originally written for Háry János, exists mainly as a separate orchestral piece)
- The Tale Begins – orchestra
- A Hussar is playing the pipe (A furulyázó huszár) – instrumental
- Song: The red apple has fallen in the mud (Piros alma leesett a sárba – Háry, Örzse)
- Plead: Oh mr. murky water, please get it together
- Drinking Song: Oh how many fishes (Ó, mely sok hal – Marci)
- Duet: This side of the Tisza (Tiszán innen, Dunán túl – Háry, Örzse)
- Intermezzo – orchestra
- Song: My little cuckoo (Ku-ku-ku-kuskám – Marie-Louise)
- Viennese Musical Clock – orchestra
- Song: How did you get here? (Hogyan tudtál, rozsám – Örzse)
- Song: Hey, two of my hens (Haj, két tikom tavali – Örzse)
- Chorus of soldiers: Oh, they took me (Sej, besoroztak)
- The Battle of Napoleon – orchestra
- Song: Oh you old porcupine (O, te vén sülülülülü – Napoleon)
- Song: Leave me, tourmenter (Hagyj békét, viaskodó – Ebelasztin)
- Recruiting dance: The good cavalier (A jó lovas katonának – Háry, Chorus)
- Duet with chorus: I've lit a candle for the bridegroom (Gyujtottam gyertyát – Empress, Marie-Louise, ladies-in-waiting)
- Entry of the Emperor and his cortege – orchestra
- March and Children's chorus: A, B, C, D (Ábécédé)
- Song: I am poor (Szegény vagyok – Örzse)
- Song: I will plough the emperor's courtyard (Felszántom a császár udvarát – Háry)
- Closing chorus: Poor brave Hungarian people (Szegény derék magyar nép – Háry, Örzse)

== Suite ==
From the music of the opera, Kodály extracted the orchestral Háry János Suite, a popular piece in the classical repertoire. This notably includes the cimbalom, a traditional Hungarian variant of the hammer dulcimer. The world première of the suite was at the Gran Teatro del Liceo Barcelona, on 24 March 1927, by the Pau Casals Orchester conducted by Antal Fleischer.

The suite is scored for three flutes (all doubling piccolo), 2 oboes, 2 clarinets in B-flat (one doubling clarinet in E-flat and one doubling alto saxophone), 2 bassoons, 4 horns in F, 3 trumpets in C, 3 cornets in B-flat (used, alongside the trumpets, in the last movement only), 3 trombones, tuba, timpani, snare drum, bass drum, cymbals, triangle, tambourine, tam-tam, glockenspiel, chimes, xylophone, celesta, piano, cimbalom and strings.

The movements of the Háry János Suite are as follows:

1. Prelude; the Fairy Tale Begins
2. Viennese Musical Clock
3. Song
4. The Battle and Defeat of Napoleon
5. Intermezzo
6. Entrance of the Emperor and His Court

== Films and other adaptations ==
The opera has been filmed three times:

- 1941: Háry János, directed by Frigyes Bán.
- 1965: Háry János, directed by Miklós Szinetár.
- 1983: Háry János, directed by Zsolt Richly.

Miklós Rónaszegi adapted the story into a young adult novel in 1980.

== Recordings ==
- Háry János sung in Hungarian, conducted by István Kertész, with English narration by Peter Ustinov. Decca
- Háry János sung in Hungarian with dialogue, conducted by János Ferencsik. Hungaroton
- Háry János sung in Hungarian, with French narration by Gérard Depardieu. Friedemann Layer. Accord
- Háry János Suite recorded by Georg Solti with the London Philharmonic Orchestra, in 1955, Decca LXT 5059.
- Háry János Suite recorded by Artur Rodzinski with the Philharmonic Symphony Orchestra of London, in 1956, Westminster XWN 18775.
- Háry János Suite recorded by Antal Dorati with the Minneapolis Symphony Orchestra, in 1956, Mercury Living Presence MG 50132.
- Háry János Suite recorded by Zdeněk Mácal with the Milwaukee Symphony Orchestra, in 1990, Koss Classics KC-1008.
