= Székely fonó =

1932 Opera by Zoltán Kodály

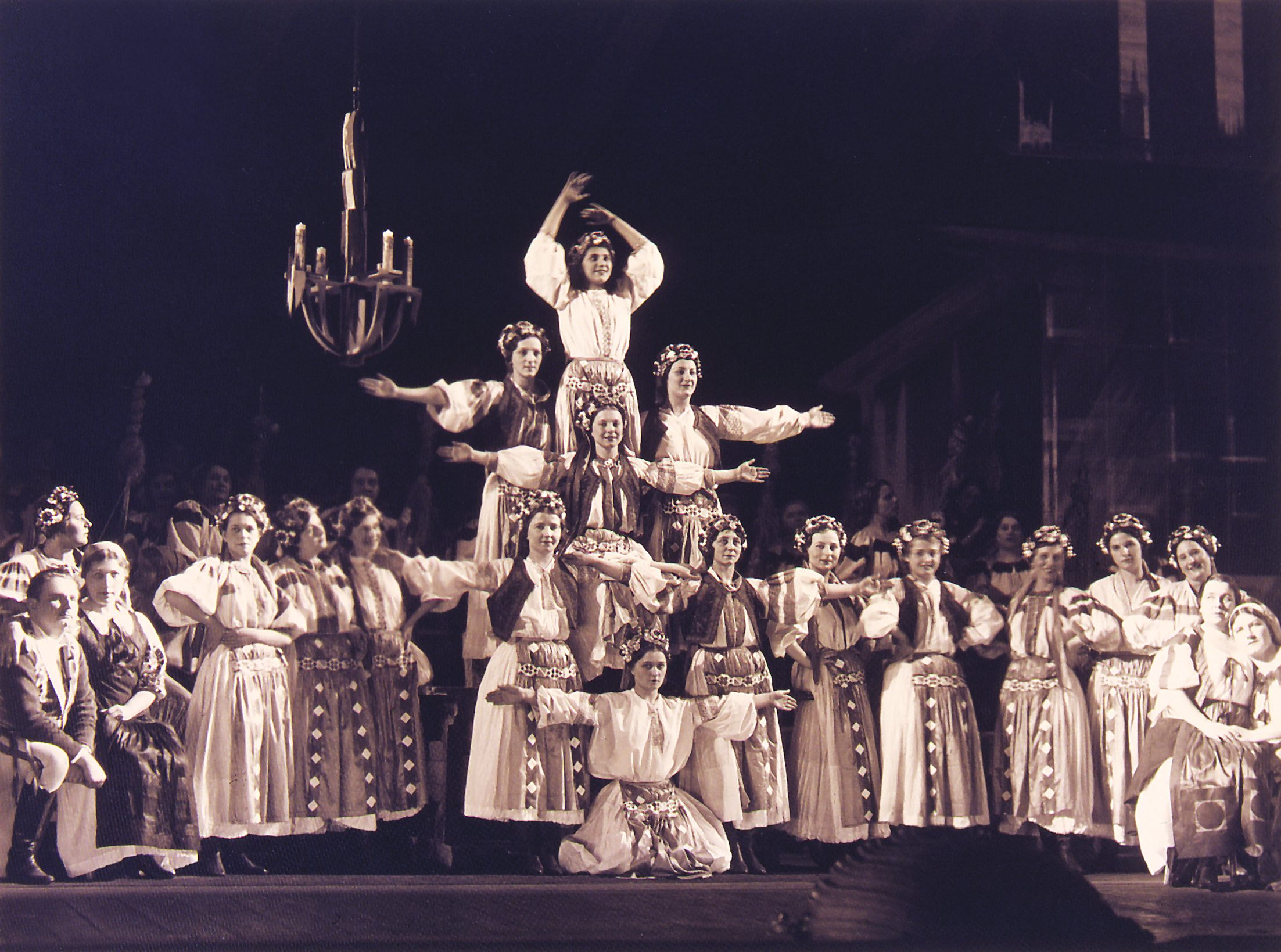
Still from the world premiere

Székely fonó (The Spinning Room) is a one-act theatre piece with music by Zoltán Kodály from Hungarian folk songs. The work is described as ‘Daljáték egy felvonásban’, folk songs in one act. First created in 1924 as a short cabaret with a small accompanying orchestral ensemble, Kodály expanded the work, with mime but without dialogue for a full production at the Royal Hungarian Opera House, Budapest in 1932. The songs and dances are taken from Transylvanian folk music, and include spinning choruses and musical pictures representing death, burial, betrothal and marriage folk-rituals. The work is sometimes referred to as The Transylvanian Spinning Room in English.

== Background ==
After the 1924 performances Kodály wrote "through hearing these songs in the concert hall I realized that, torn from their natural environment they are scarcely intelligible. The whole purpose of my present experiment was to attempt to display them in a living unity with the life from which they have sprung..." Kodály continued "Székely fonó is not an experiment in opera"; Eösze describes it, with its 27 songs, ballads, dances and musical games, as a dramatic rhapsody or operatic folk-ballad.

In his first stage work, Háry János, Kodály had used the layout of musical 'numbers' with solos, duets, and choruses and spoken dialogue in between. In the final version of Székely fonó orchestral bridge passages link some of the numbers. The music consists mostly of Transylvanian folk melodies whose words suggest action, although the nature of the work is more that of a scenic cantata. The piece might also be described as "a mimed action to vocal, choral and orchestral accompaniment" and is in some ways reminiscent of Stravinsky’s Les Noces. The work came a year after Kodály's first major success with Psalmus Hungaricus, and along with the Székely folk material contains "lush chromaticism and rigorous contrapuntal devices".

== Performance history ==
The first performance of Székely fonó took place at the Royal Hungarian Opera House in Budapest on 24 April 1932, when it was warmly received. It was the first Hungarian operatic work to be produced in Italy (as La Filanda Magiara) in Milan on 14 January 1933, and was broadcast from London on 26 May 1933 with the composer conducting. It was produced in Brunswick (in German) on 9 February 1938. A semi-staged version was produced at the 1982 Buxton Festival, a recording of which was broadcast in January 1983 by BBC Radio 3. A new production by Michał Znaniecki, conducted by Balázs Kocsár, was mounted at the Hungarian State Opera in October 2016.

János Ferencsik conducted two complete recordings of the work, in 1963 (Qualiton) and 1971 (Hungaroton).

== Roles ==
Role	Voice type	Premiere Cast, 24 April 1932 (Conductor: Sergio Failoni)
Háziasszony (housewife)	alto	Mária Basilides
Kérője (her suitor)	baritone	Imre Palló
Szomszédasszony (neighbour)	alto	Mária Budanovits
Fiatal Legény (young man)	tenor	Endre Rösler
Fiatal Leány (young girl)	soprano	Anna Báthy
A Nagyorrú Bolha (flea)	baritone	Oszkár Maleczky
Chorus, dancers

== Synopsis ==
The setting is a spinning room in the Székely region

In the first scene, a man and woman say farewell before he is taken away. A little girl tries to stop him leaving. Two gendarmes appear at the doorway, search the room; the man goes out. In the second scene the woman bemoans her fate. Women and girls from the village enter in the third scene, attend to chores around the spinning room and a young woman sings a lively song of their life with so many men absent from home. There is a dance and they try to comfort the lone woman. The woman sings of thirty-three weeping willow branches and thirty-three peacocks, then a neighbour enters with a song about animals bought at the market (with their distinctive sounds). The fourth scene is a choral exchange between the young men who have entered and the young women who exchange taunts. In a pantomime a young man dresses as a ghost but is beaten by the girls. The fifth scene involves a young man Lázlós singing to his mother that he is dying of heartache, and there follows a traditional folk-song of spinning gold and silver, and the ballad ‘Ilona Görög’ (Helen). Scene six introduces a masker, disguised as a flea claiming riches but looking for lodgings, and seeking food. However, the gendarmes return - the man they arrested has protested his innocence. An old woman claims to know the real culprit – it is the 'flea' who is now hiding in a corner. In the final scene the man is reunited with the woman he loves and the village celebrates in song and dance.

Kodály wrote of the beauty and variety of Hungarian folk songs "like jewels sparkling in a strange, ancient fire"; these form the thread of the work, while his accompaniments are "full of colour, lush chromaticism and contrapuntal effects based on close canon and imitation".

== Recording ==
- Székely fonó János Ferencsik 1963 (Qualiton) and
- Székely fonó János Ferencsik 1971 (Hungaroton) 2 LP, reissued on CD as Spinning Room Hungaroton with Orchestral songs: Kadar Kata (Mother Listen) Kallai kettos (Double dance of Kallo) and The Ballad of Annie Miller, 'From distant mountains'.
