= Holice (disambiguation) =

Holice may refer to

- Holice, a town in the Pardubice Region of the Czech Republic
- Holice, Dunajská Streda District, a municipality and village in the Trnava Region of Slovakia
- Holice, a former village, now part of the city of Olomouc in the Czech Republic
