= Otto Klemperer discography =

The conductor Otto Klemperer made many recordings. The first table, below, shows his recordings from his first, in 1924, to 1954, the year in which he first recorded with the Philharmonia, which played on most of his subsequent recordings until his retirement in 1972.

== 1924 to 1954 ==
Composer	Work	Orchestra	Soloists/choir	Year	Venue	Studio/live
Bruckner	Symphony No. 8 in C minor: Adagio	Staatskapelle Berlin		1924	Berlin	Studio
Beethoven	Symphony No. 1 in C Op. 21	Staatskapelle Berlin		1924	Berlin	Studio
Beethoven	Symphony No. 8 in F Op. 93	Staatskapelle Berlin		1924	Berlin	Studio
Schubert	Symphony No. 8 in B minor D. 759 "Unfinished"	Staatskapelle Berlin		1924	Berlin	Studio
Beethoven	Symphony No. 8 in F Op. 93	Staatskapelle Berlin		1926	Berlin	Studio
Debussy	Nocturnes "Nuages" & "Fêtes"	Staatskapelle Berlin		1926	Berlin	Studio
Ravel	Alborada del gracioso	Staatskapelle Berlin		1926	Berlin	Studio
Beethoven	Coriolan Overture Op. 62	Staatskapelle Berlin		1927	Berlin	Studio
Beethoven	Egmont Overture Op. 84	Staatskapelle Berlin		1927	Berlin	Studio
Beethoven	Leonore Overture No. 3	Staatskapelle Berlin		1927	Berlin	Studio
Mendelssohn	A Midsummer Night's Dream Overture, Op. 21	Staatskapelle Berlin		1927	Berlin	Studio
Wagner	Siegfried Idyll (original version for 13 instruments)	Staatskapelle Berlin		1927	Berlin	Studio
Weber	Euryanthe Overture	Staatskapelle Berlin		1927	Berlin	Studio
Brahms	Academic Festival Overture Op. 80	Staatsoper Berlin		1927	Berlin	Studio
Wagner	Tristan und Isolde Act 1 Prelude	Staatsoper Berlin		1927	Berlin	Studio
Brahms	Symphony No. 1 in C minor Op. 68	Staatskapelle Berlin		1927	Berlin	Studio
Strauss, R.	Salome Salome's Dance	Staatsoper Berlin		1928	Berlin	Studio
Auber	Fra Diavolo Overture	Staatskapelle Berlin		1929	Berlin	Studio
Offenbach	La Belle Hélène Overture	Staatskapelle Berlin		1929	Berlin	Studio
Strauss, R.	Till Eulenspiegels lustige Streiche Op. 28	Staatskapelle Berlin		1929	Berlin	Studio
Strauss, R.	Don Juan Op. 20	Staatskapelle Berlin		1929	Berlin	Studio
Weill	Kleine Dreigroschenmusik	Staatskapelle Berlin		1931	Berlin	Studio
Verdi	Otello Act IV Desdemona's prayer	Berliner Funk	Rose Ader, soprano	1931	Berlin	Studio
Hindemith	Das Unaufhörliche (excerpts)	Staatskapelle Berlin		1932	Berlin	Studio
Beethoven	Symphony No. 5 in C minor Op. 67	Los Angeles Philharmonic		1934	Pasadena	Live
Verdi	I Vespri Siciliani Overture	Los Angeles Philharmonic		1934	Pasadena	Live
Wagner	Die Meistersinger von Nürnberg Act I Prelude	Los Angeles Philharmonic		1934	Pasadena	Live
Bruckner	Symphony No. 9 in D minor	New York Philharmonic		1934	New York	Live
Albeniz, arr Arbos	"Triana" (from Iberia Suite)	Los Angeles Philharmonic		1937	Los Angeles	Live
German	Who'll buy my sweet lavender?	Los Angeles Philharmonic	Lucrezia Bori, soprano	1937	Los Angeles	Live
Gounod	Faust: Salut! demeure	Los Angeles Philharmonic	Lucrezia Bori, soprano	1937	Los Angeles	Live
Massenet	Manon: Obéissons quand leur voix appelle	Los Angeles Philharmonic	Lucrezia Bori, soprano; Joseph Bentonelli, tenor	1937	Los Angeles	Live
Puccini	La bohème "Che gelida manina"; "O soave fanciulla"; "Si, mi chiamano Mimi"	Los Angeles Philharmonic	Lucrezia Bori soprano; Joseph Bentonelli, tenor	1937	Los Angeles	Live
Wagner	Rienzi Overture	Los Angeles Philharmonic		1937	Los Angeles	Live
Gershwin	Prelude No. 2	Los Angeles Philharmonic		1937	Los Angeles	Live
Berlioz	Benvenuto Cellini Overture	Los Angeles Philharmonic		1938	Los Angeles	Live
Debussy	Prélude à l'après-midi d'un faune	Los Angeles Philharmonic		1938	Los Angeles	Live
Mozart	Symphony No. 35 in D K. 385 "Haffner"	Los Angeles Philharmonic		1938	Los Angeles	Live
Strauss, R.	Till Eulenspiegels lustige Streiche Op. 28	Los Angeles Philharmonic		1938	Los Angeles	Live
Handel / Schoenberg	Quartet Concerto – excerpts	Los Angeles Philharmonic	Kolisch Quartet	1938	Los Angeles	Live
Brahms / Schoenberg	Piano Quartet No. 1 in G minor Op. 25	Los Angeles Philharmonic		1938	Los Angeles	Live
Strang	Intermezzo	Los Angeles Philharmonic		1939	Los Angeles	Studio
Klemperer	Lieder		Maria Schacko, soprano Otto Klemperer, piano	1940	New York	Studio
Pfitzner	Lieder		Maria Schacko, soprano; Otto Klemperer, piano	1940	New York	Studio
Bach	Concerto for Harpsichord and Strings No. 2 in E BWV 1053	Amsterdam Strings	Edith Weiss- Mann, harpsichord	1940	New York	Live
Bach	Concerto for Flute, Violin, Harpsichord and Strings in A minor BWV 1044	Amsterdam Strings	Edith Weiss- Mann, harpsichord; John Meisner, flute; Dorothy Chester (), violin	1940	New York	Live
Klemperer	Au clair de la lune	NBC Orchestra		1940	New York	Studio
Klemperer	Merry Waltz	NBC Orchestra		1940	New York	Studio
Klemperer	Trinity	NBC Orchestra	NBC Chorus	1940	New York	Studio
Mozart	Symphony No. 40 in G minor K. 550	Los Angeles Philharmonic		1941	Los Angeles	Live
Beethoven	Symphony No. 5 in C minor Op. 67 (mvts. 3 & 4 only)	Los Angeles Philharmonic		1941	Los Angeles	Live
Bach	Orchestral Suite No. 2 in B minor BWV 1067	Friends of Music	John Wummer, flute, Rudolf Kolisch, violin	1942	New York	Live
Dvorák	Symphony No. 9 in E minor Op. 95 "From the New World"	Los Angeles Philharmonic Orchestra		1945	Los Angeles (San Diego)	Live
Bach	Bist du bei mir BWV 508 (arr. Klemperer)	Los Angeles Philharmonic		1945	Los Angeles (San Diego)	Live
Liszt	Totentanz for piano and G. 126	Los Angeles Philharmonic	Bernardo Segall, piano	1945	Los Angeles (San Diego)	Live
Strauss, Joh. II	Die Fledermaus Overture	Los Angeles Philharmonic		1945	Los Angeles (San Diego)	Live
Thomas	Mignon Overture	Los Angeles Philharmonic		1945	Los Angeles	Live
Bach	Orchestral Suite No. 3 in D BWV 1068 Air	Los Angeles Philharmonic		1945	Los Angeles	Live
Beethoven	Leonore Overture No. 3 Op. 72b	Los Angeles Philharmonic		1945	Los Angeles	Live
Corelli	Sonata in D minor for Violin Op. 5 No. 2, "La Folia"	Los Angeles Philharmonic	Joseph Szigeti, violin	1945	Los Angeles	Live
Strauss, R.	Don Juan Op. 20	Los Angeles Philharmonic		1945	Los Angeles	Live
Bach	Bist du bei mir BWV 508 (arr. Klemperer)	Pro Musica		1946	Paris	Studio
Bach	Brandenburg Concerto No. 1 in F BWV 1046	Pro Musica		1946	Paris	Studio
Bach	Brandenburg Concerto No. 2 in F BWV 1047	Pro Musica	Marcel Mule, soprano saxophone	1946	Paris	Studio
Bach	Brandenburg Concerto No. 3 in G BWV 1048	Pro Musica		1946	Paris	Studio
Bach	Brandenburg Concerto No. 4 in G BWV 1049	Pro Musica		1946	Paris	Studio
Bach	Brandenburg Concerto No. 5 in D BWV 1050	Pro Musica	M. Roesgen-Champion, harpsichord, R. Cortet, flute, H. Merckel, violin	1946	Paris	Studio
Bach	Brandenburg Concerto No. 6 in B flat BWV 1051	Pro Musica		1946	Paris	Studio
Bach	Chorale Nun komm' der Heiden Heiland, BWV 659 (arr. Klemperer)	Pro Musica		1946	Paris	Studio
Mozart	Serenade No. 13 in G K. 525 "Eine kleine Nachtmusik"	Pro Musica		1946	Paris	Studio
Purcell / Byrnes	The Fairie Queen Suite	Wiener Philharmoniker		1947	Salzburg	Live
Bruckner	Symphony No. 4 in E flat "Romantic"	Concertgebouw		1947	Amsterdam	Live
Mahler	Lieder eines fahrenden Gesellen	Concertgebouw	Hermann Schey, baritone	1947	Amsterdam	Live
Mendelssohn	The Hebrides Overture Op. 26	Concertgebouw		1947	Amsterdam	Live
Schubert	Symphony No. 8 in B minor D. 759 "Unfinished"	Budapest Symphony		1948	Budapest	Live
Mozart	Don Giovanni K. 527 (excerpts)	Hungarian State Opera	Soloists and chorus of Hungarian State Opera	1948	Budapest	Live
Wagner	Lohengrin	Hungarian State Opera		1948	Budapest	Live
Mahler	Das Lied von der Erde	Hungarian Radio Symphony	Judit Sándor, soprano, Endre Rösler, tenor	1948	Budapest	Live
Mozart	Masonic Funeral Music in C minor K. 477	Hungarian Radio Symphony		1948	Budapest	Live
Beethoven	Fidelio Op. 72	Hungarian State Opera	Soloists and chorus of Hungarian State Opera	1948	Budapest	Live
Bach	Orchestral Suite No. 4 in D BWV 1069	Hungarian Radio Symphony		1949	Budapest	Studio
Mozart	Die Zauberflöte K. 620	Hungarian State Opera	Soloists and chorus of Hungarian State Opera	1949	Budapest	Live
Offenbach	Les Contes d'Hoffman	Hungarian State Opera	Soloists and chorus of Hungarian State Opera	1949	Budapest	Live
Wagner	Die Meistersinger von Nürnberg	Hungarian State Opera	Soloists and chorus of Hungarian State Opera	1949	Budapest	Live
Mozart	Symphony No. 39 in E flat K. 543	Hungarian Radio Symphony		1949	Budapest	Studio
Beethoven	Symphony No. 8 in F Op. 93	Concertgebouw		1949	Amsterdam	Live
Bach	Orchestral Suite No. 2 in B minor BWV 1067	Hungarian Radio Symphony	János Szebenyi, flute	1949	Budapest	Live
Bach	Brandenburg Concerto No. 4 in G BWV 1049	Hungarian Radio Symphony	Annie Fischer, piano	1950	Budapest	Live
Bach	Brandenburg Concerto No. 5 in D BWV 1050	Hungarian Radio Symphony	Tibor Ney, violin; János Szebenyi, flute; Annie Fischer, piano	1950	Budapest	Live
Bach	Magnificat in D BWV 243	Hungarian Radio Symphony	Budapest Chorus, Anna Báthy, soprano, Judit Sándor, soprano, Magda Tiszay, contralto, Lajos Somogyvári, tenor, György Littasy, bass; Olivér Nagy, piano, Sándor Margittay, organ continuo	1950	Budapest	Live
Mozart	Così fan tutte K. 588	Hungarian State Opera	Soloists and chorus of Hungarian State Opera	1950	Budapest	Live
Mozart	Concerto for piano and No. 26 In D K. 537	Pro Musica	Louise Thyrion, piano	1950	Paris	Studio
Mozart	Symphony No. 25 in G minor K. 183	Pro Musica		1950	Paris	Studio
Mozart	Symphony No. 36 in C K. 425 "Linz"	Pro Musica		1950	Paris	Studio
Mozart	Die Entführung aus dem Serail K. 384	Hungarian State Opera	Soloists and chorus of Hungarian State Opera	1950	Budapest	Live
Mahler	Symphony No. 2 in C minor "Resurrection"	Sydney Symphony	Hurlstone Choral Society, Valda Bagnall, soprano; Florence Taylor, contralto	1950	Sydney	Live
Schubert	Symphony No. 4 in C minor D. 417 "Tragic"	Lamoureux		1950	Paris	Studio
Mozart	Serenade No. 11 in E flat K. 375	Rias Sinfonie-		1950	Berlin	Studio
Mozart	Don Giovanni Overture K. 527	RIAS Symphonie		1950	Berlin	Studio
Mozart	Symphony No. 25 In G minor K. 183	RIAS Symphonie		1950	Berlin	Studio
Mozart	Symphony No. 29 in A K. 201	RIAS Symphonie		1950	Berlin	Studio
Mozart	Serenade No. 6 in D K. 239 "Serenata Notturna"	RIAS Symphonie		1950	Berlin	Studio
Mozart	Symphony No. 38 in D K. 504 "Prague"	RIAS Symphonie		1950	Berlin	Studio
Bartók	Concerto for Viola and Sz. 120	Concertgebouw	William Primrose, viola	1951	Amsterdam	Live
De Falla	Nights in the Gardens of Spain	Concertgebouw	Willem Andriessen, piano	1951	Amsterdam	Live
Henkemans	Concerto for Flute and (1946)	Concertgebouw	Hubert Barwahser, flute	1951	Amsterdam	Live
Janácek	Sinfonietta	Concertgebouw		1951	Amsterdam	Live
Mozart	Concerto for Violin and No. 5 in A K. 219 "Turkish"	Concertgebouw	Jan Bresser, violin	1951	Amsterdam	Live
Mozart	Symphony No. 25 in G minor K. 183	Concertgebouw		1951	Amsterdam	Live
Mozart	Serenade No. 6 in D K. 239 "Serenata Notturna"	Radio- Beromünster		1951	Zurich	Studio
Mozart	Concerto for Piano and Orchestra No. 20 in D minor K. 466	Iba Symphony	Frank Pelleg, piano	1951	Jerusalem	Studio
Mozart	Serenade No. 6 in D K. 239 "Serenata Notturna"	Iba Symphony		1951	Jerusalem	Studio
Mozart	Symphony No. 29 in A K. 201	Iba Symphony		1951	Jerusalem	Studio
Beethoven	Missa solemnis Op. 123	Wiener Symphoniker	Akademiechor, Ilona Steingruber, soprano, Else Schuerhoff, contralto, Erich Majkut, tenor, Otto Wiener, bass	1951	Vienna	Studio
Beethoven	Symphony No. 6 in F Op. 68 "Pastoral"	Wiener Symphoniker		1951	Vienna	Studio
Bruckner	Symphony No. 4 in E flat "Romantic"	Wiener Symphoniker		1951	Vienna	Studio
Mahler	Das Lied von der Erde	Wiener Symphoniker	Elsa Cavelti, Mezzo-soprano,	1951	Vienna	Studio
Beethoven	Symphony No. 5 in C minor Op. 67	Wiener Symphoniker		1951	Vienna	Studio
Mendelssohn	Symphony No. 4 in A Op. 90 "Italian"	Wiener Symphoniker		1951	Vienna	Studio
Beethoven	Ah, Perfido! Op. 65	Concertgebouw	Gré Brouwenstijn, soprano	1951	Amsterdam	Live
Beethoven	Symphony No. 7 in A Op. 92	Concertgebouw		1951	Amsterdam	Live
Mahler	Symphony No. 2 in C minor, "Resurrection"	Wiener Symphoniker	Akademie Kammerchor & Singverein der Musikfreunde, Ilona Steingruber, soprano, Hilde Rössl-Majdan, contralto	1951	Vienna	Studio
Mahler	Symphony No. 2 in C minor "Resurrection"	Wiener Symphoniker	Akademie Kammerchor & Singverein der Musikfreunde, Ilona Steingruber, soprano, Hilde Rössl-Majdan, contralto	1951	Vienna	Live
Beethoven	Concerto for piano and No. 4 in G Op. 58	Wiener Symphoniker	Guiomar Novaes, piano	1951	Vienna	Studio
Chopin	Concerto No. 2 in F minor for Piano and Orchestra Op. 21	Wiener Symphoniker	Guiomar Novaes, piano	1951	Vienna	Studio
Mendelssohn	Symphony No. 3 in A minor Op. 56 "Scottish"	Wiener Symphoniker		1951	Vienna	Studio
Schumann	Concerto for piano and in A minor Op. 54	Wiener Symphoniker	Guiomar Novaes, piano	1951	Vienna	Studio
Mahler	Kindertotenlieder	Concertgebouw	Kathleen Ferrier, contralto	1951	Amsterdam	Live
Mahler	Symphony No. 2 in C minor "Resurrection"	Concertgebouw	Toonkunstkoor, Jo Vincent, soprano, Kathleen Ferrier, contralto	1951	Amsterdam	Live
Mozart	Masonic Funeral Music in C minor K. 477	Concertgebouw		1951	Amsterdam	Live
Beethoven	Leonore Overture No. 3 Op. 72b	Det Kongelige Kapel		1954	Copenhagen	Live
Brahms	Symphony No. 4 in E minor Op.98	Det Kongelige Kapel		1954	Copenhagen	Live
Mozart	Symphony No. 29 in A K. 201	Det Kongelige Kapel		1954	Copenhagen	Live
Beethoven	Symphony No. 3 in E flat Op. 55 "Eroica"	Kölner Rundfunk- Sinfonie-Orchester		1954	Cologne	Live
Hindemith	Nobilissima Visione Ballet Suite	Kölner Rundfunk- Sinfonie-Orchester		1954	Cologne	Live
Mozart	Symphony No. 29 in A K. 201	Kölner Rundfunk- Sinfonie-Orchester		1954	Cologne	Live
Beethoven	Concerto for piano and No. 3 In C minor Op. 37	RIAS Symphonie	Hans-Erich Riebensahm, piano	1954	Berlin	Live
Beethoven	Symphony No. 6 in F Op. 68 "Pastoral"	RIAS Symphonie		1954	Berlin	Live
Hindemith	Nobilissima Visione Ballet Suite	RIAS Symphonie		1954	Berlin	Studio
Beethoven	Symphony No. 1 in C Op. 21	Kölner Rundfunk- Sinfonie		1954	Cologne	Live
Mahler	Symphony No. 4 in G	Kölner Rundfunk- Sinfonie	Elfride Trötschel, soprano	1954	Cologne	Live
Brahms	Concerto No. 2 for piano and in B flat Op. 83	Kölner Rundfunk- Sinfonie	Géza Anda, piano	1954	Cologne	Live
Bruckner	Symphony No. 4 in E flat "Romantic"	Kölner Rundfunk- Sinfonie		1954	Cologne	Live
Mendelssohn	Concerto for Violin and in E minor Op. 64	Residentie	Johanna Martzy, violin	1954	Amsterdam	Live
Mozart	Don Giovanni Overture K. 527	Residentie		1954	Amsterdam	Live
Mozart	Symphony No. 41 in C K. 551 "Jupiter"	Residentie		1954	Scheveningen	Live
Brahms	Symphony No. 1 In C minor Op. 68	Orchestre National de Radio France		1954	Montreux	Live
Beethoven	Symphony No. 7 in A Op. 92	RIAS Symphonie		1954	Berlin	Live

second tranche in preparation. Earlier list left below for the time being

- Bach: St Matthew Passion with Dietrich Fischer-Dieskau, Peter Pears, Elisabeth Schwarzkopf, Christa Ludwig, and Walter Berry
- Bach: Mass in B minor
- Bach: Brandenburg Concertos with the Philharmonia Orchestra on ΕΜΙ
- Bartók: Viola Concerto (with William Primrose, and the Concertgebouw Orchestra, live version on Archiphon)
- Beethoven: Symphony cycles (notably the one from the mid-1950s on EMI)
- Beethoven: Symphony No. 9 (recorded live, November 1957 and also in 1961)
- Beethoven: Fidelio (both the live recording from Covent Garden on Testament, and the studio EMI recording)
- Beethoven: Missa solemnis
- Beethoven: Piano Concertos Nos. 3–5, (with Claudio Arrau, live versions issued on Testament)
- Beethoven: Piano Concertos Nos. 1–5, (with Daniel Barenboim, on EMI)
- Brahms: Symphony cycles
- Brahms: Symphony No. 3, Philharmonia Orchestra, Columbia C90933, in 1957
- Brahms: Violin Concerto, with David Oistrakh
- Brahms: Ein deutsches Requiem, Philharmonia Orchestra with Elisabeth Schwarzkopf and Dietrich Fischer-Dieskau, 1961 EMI recording
- Bruckner: Symphony No. 4 in E-flat Major
- Bruckner: Symphony No. 5 in B-flat Major, New Philharmonia Orchestra, March 1967 on Columbia SAX 5288
- Bruckner: Symphony No. 6 in A Major, New Philharmonia Orchestra, 1964 on Columbia SMC 91437
- Bruckner: Symphony No. 7 in E Major, Symphonieorchester des Bayerischen Rundfunks, 1957
- Bruckner: Symphony No. 9 in D Minor with New York Philharmonic, 1934, and with New Philharmonia on EMI
- Chopin: Piano Concerto No. 1 with Claudio Arrau, live version issued on Music & Arts
- Franck: Symphony in D minor
- Handel: Messiah, with Elisabeth Schwarzkopf, Grace Hoffman, Nicolai Gedda, and Jerome Hines
- Haydn: Symphonies 88, 92, 95, 98, 100, 101, 102, 104
- Hindemith: Nobilissima Visione Suite (Kölner Rundfunk-Sinfonie-Orchester, a 1954 version issued on Andante)
- Janáček: Sinfonietta (a 1951 Concertgebouw Orchestra live version, released by Archiphon)
- Mahler: Das Lied von der Erde, with Christa Ludwig and Fritz Wunderlich, New Philharmonia Orchestra, 1967 on EMI YAX 3282
- Mahler: Symphony No. 2 in C Minor, "Resurrection", (1) – 1951 with Kathleen Ferrier & Jo Vincent; (2) – 1963 with Elisabeth Schwarzkopf & Hilde Rössel-Majdan
- Mahler: Symphony No. 4, Philharmonia Orchestra with Elisabeth Schwarzkopf, 1961, on Columbia SAX 2441
- Mahler: Symphony No. 7, 1968
- Mahler: Symphony No. 9
- Mendelssohn: Symphonies Nos. 3-4
- Mendelssohn: A Midsummer Night's Dream
- Mozart: Piano Concerto No. 25 (with Daniel Barenboim)
- Mozart: Symphonies Nos. 25, 29, 31, 33, 34, 35, 36, 38, 39, 40 and 41
- Mozart: Don Giovanni (live version issued on Testament)
- Mozart: The Magic Flute, with Nicolai Gedda, Walter Berry, Gundula Janowitz, Lucia Popp, Elisabeth Schwarzkopf as the First Lady
- Schoenberg: Verklärte Nacht (a 1955 live version with the Concertgebouw Orchestra, on Archiphon)
- Schubert: Symphonies 5, 8 (Unfinished) and 9. Philharmonia Orchestra (EMI)
- Schumann: Symphonies 1–4, with the Philharmonia Orchestra.
- Schumann: Piano Concerto (with Annie Fischer)
- Stravinsky: Petrushka
- Stravinsky: Pulcinella
- Stravinsky: Symphony in Three Movements
- Tchaikovsky: Symphonies Nos. 4, 5 and 6 with the Philharmonia Orchestra on EMI
- Wagner: Der fliegende Holländer (with Anja Silja)
- Wagner: Siegfried Idyll in the original chamber version with members of the Philharmonia Orchestra
- Weill: Kleine Dreigroschenmusik, 1931, 1967

Source: Discographies in Volumes 1 and 2 of Peter Heyworth's biography of Klemperer.

== Sources ==
- Heyworth, Peter (1996) [1983]. Otto Klemperer: Volume 1, 1885–1933. Cambridge: Cambridge University Press. ISBN 978-0-521-49509-7.
- Heyworth, Peter (1996). Otto Klemperer: Volume 2, 1933–1973. Cambridge: Cambridge University Press. ISBN 978-0-521-24488-6.
