= Anna Báthy =

- Born: Annette Stampf; June 13, 1901; Beregszàsz (Berehove), Austria-Hungary
- Died: May 20, 1962 (aged 60); Budapest, Hungary
- Education: Budapest Academy of Music
- Occupation: Operatic soprano
- Years active: 1928–1959
- Awards: Kossuth Prize; People's Artist of Hungary

Anna Báthy (born Annette Stampf, June 13, 1901 – May 20, 1962) was a Hungarian soprano.

== Biography ==
Annette Stampf was born on June 13, 1901 in Beregszàsz (Berehove). She was trained as an opera singer at the Budapest Academy of Music where she was a student of voice teacher Bianca Maleczky. In 1928 she made her opera debut as Elizabeth in Richard Wagner's Tannhäuser at the Budapest Municipal Theatre (Városi Színház). In 1929 she made her debut at the Hungarian State Opera House as Amelia in Giuseppe Verdi's Un ballo in maschera. She had a long career as a member at that theatre which lasted until her retirement from the stage in 1959.

In Budapest Báthy excelled in the dramatic soprano repertoire of Wagner; included Elsa in Lohengrin, Eva in Die Meistersinger von Nürnberg, Isolde in Tristan und Isolde, Senta Der fliegende Holländer, and Sieglinde in Die Walküre. She was also known for her performances in the operas of Verdi; portraying roles like Desdemona in Otello, Élisabeth de Valois in Don Carlos, Leonoara in both Il trovatore and La forza del destino, and the title role in Aida. She was also successful in the operas of Mozart; performing repertoire like Donna Anna and Donna Elvira in Don Giovanni and Pamina in The Magic Flute.

On 24 April 1932 Báthy created the role of Fiatal Leány in the world premiere of Zoltán Kodály's Székely fonó. Other roles Báthy performed in staged operas inclued Agathe in Der Freischütz, Leonore in Beethoven's Fidelio, both Octavian and the Marschallin in Der Rosenkavalier, and the title role in Arabella and Tosca. She was also a frequent recurring guest at the Vienna State Opera from 1934 to 1937.

Báthy died in Budapest on May 20, 1962. Honors she was awarded during her lifetime included the Kossuth Prize and People's Artist of Hungary.
