= Szekszárd =

City with county rights in Tolna, Hungary

- City with county rights
- Szekszárd Megyei Jogú Város
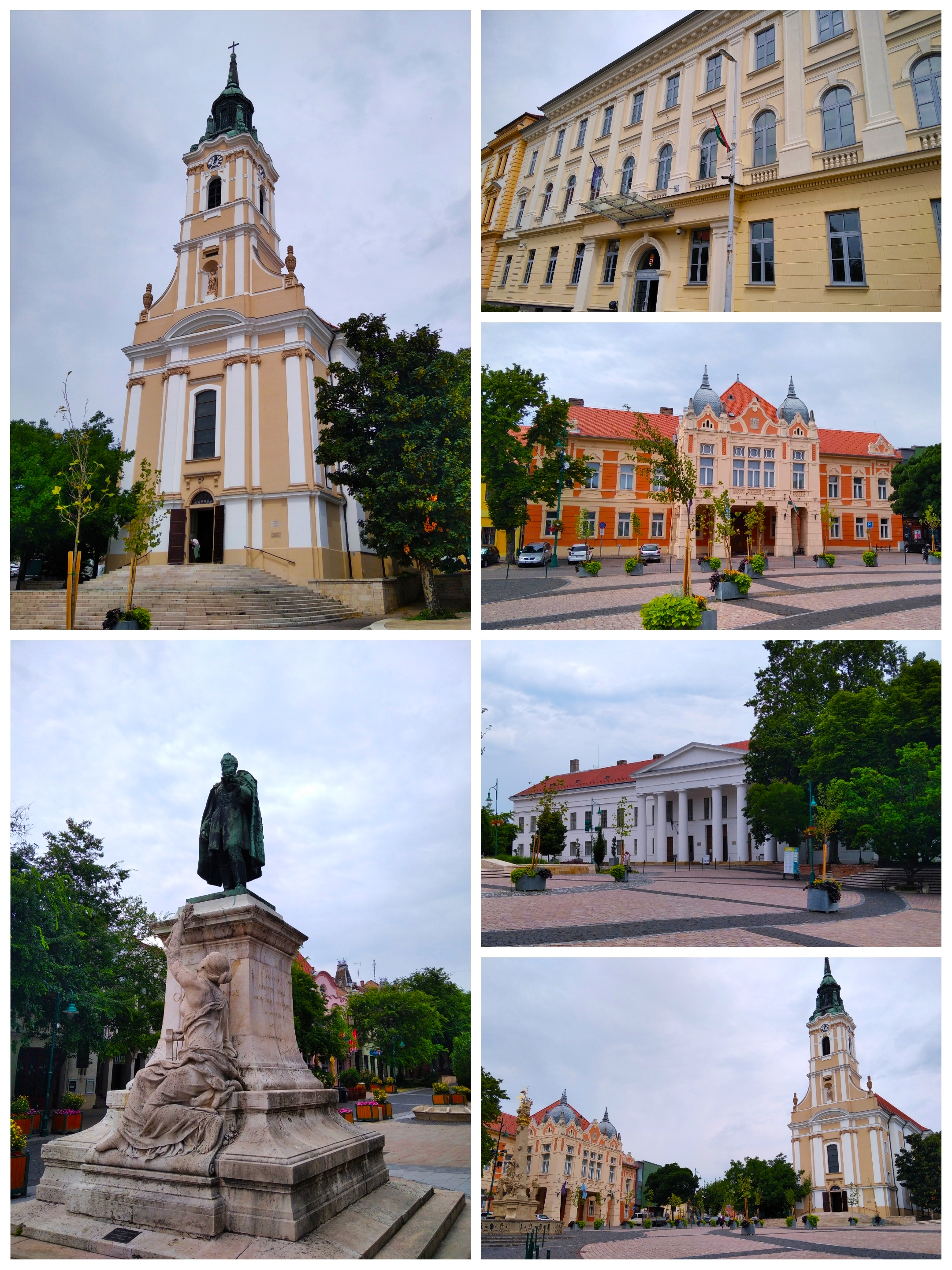

- Flag Coat of arms

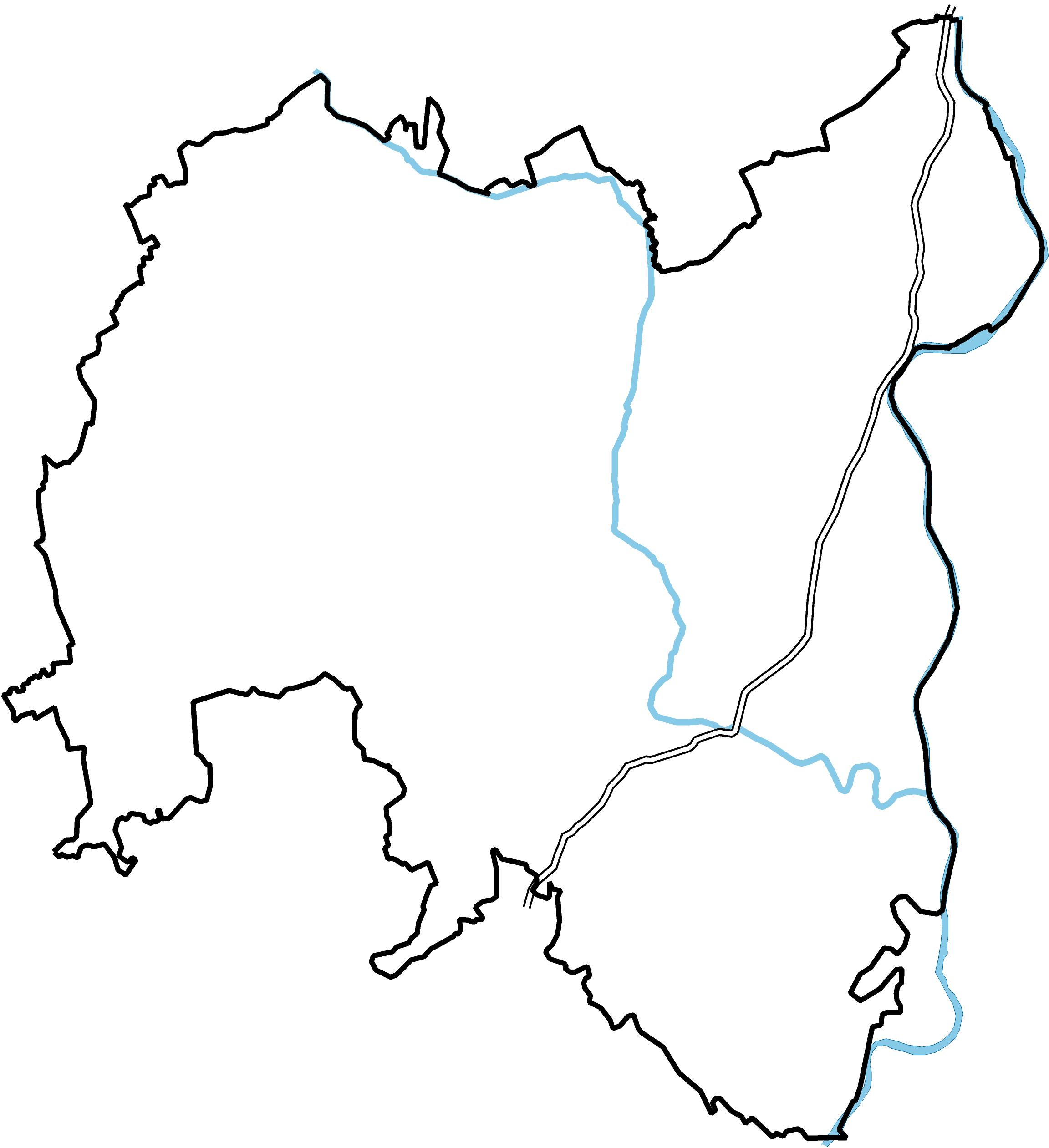
- Location within Tolna County Location within Hungary Location within Europe
- Coordinates: 46.35597°N 18.70382°E
- Country: Hungary
- County: Tolna
- District: Szekszárd

Area
  - Total: 96.27 km^{2} (37.17 sq mi)
- Elevation: 83 m (272 ft)

Population (2022 census)
  - Total: 29,889
  - Density: 310.47/km^{2} (804.1/sq mi)
- Time zone: UTC+1 (CET)
  - Summer (DST): UTC+2 (CEST)
- Postal code: 7100
- Area code: (+36) 74
- Website: szekszard.hu

Szekszárd (Hungarian: [ˈsɛksaːrd], formerly also Szegzárd; Croatian: Seksar; German: Sechshard or Sechsard; Serbian: Сексард) is a small city in southern Hungary and the capital of Tolna County. By population, Szekszárd is the smallest county capital in Hungary; by area, it is the second-smallest (after Tatabánya).

== Location ==
Szekszárd lies at the meeting point of the Transdanubian Hills and the Great Hungarian Plain, at the mouth of Sió into the flood plain of Danube.

== Etymology ==
The Etymological Dictionary of Geographical Names, somewhat differently from the above, derives the name of the locality from the old Hungarian colour name szegszár (sötétsárga, brownish yellow), which could have become a personal name with the diminutive -d and thus could have been a predecessor of the town name.

== History ==
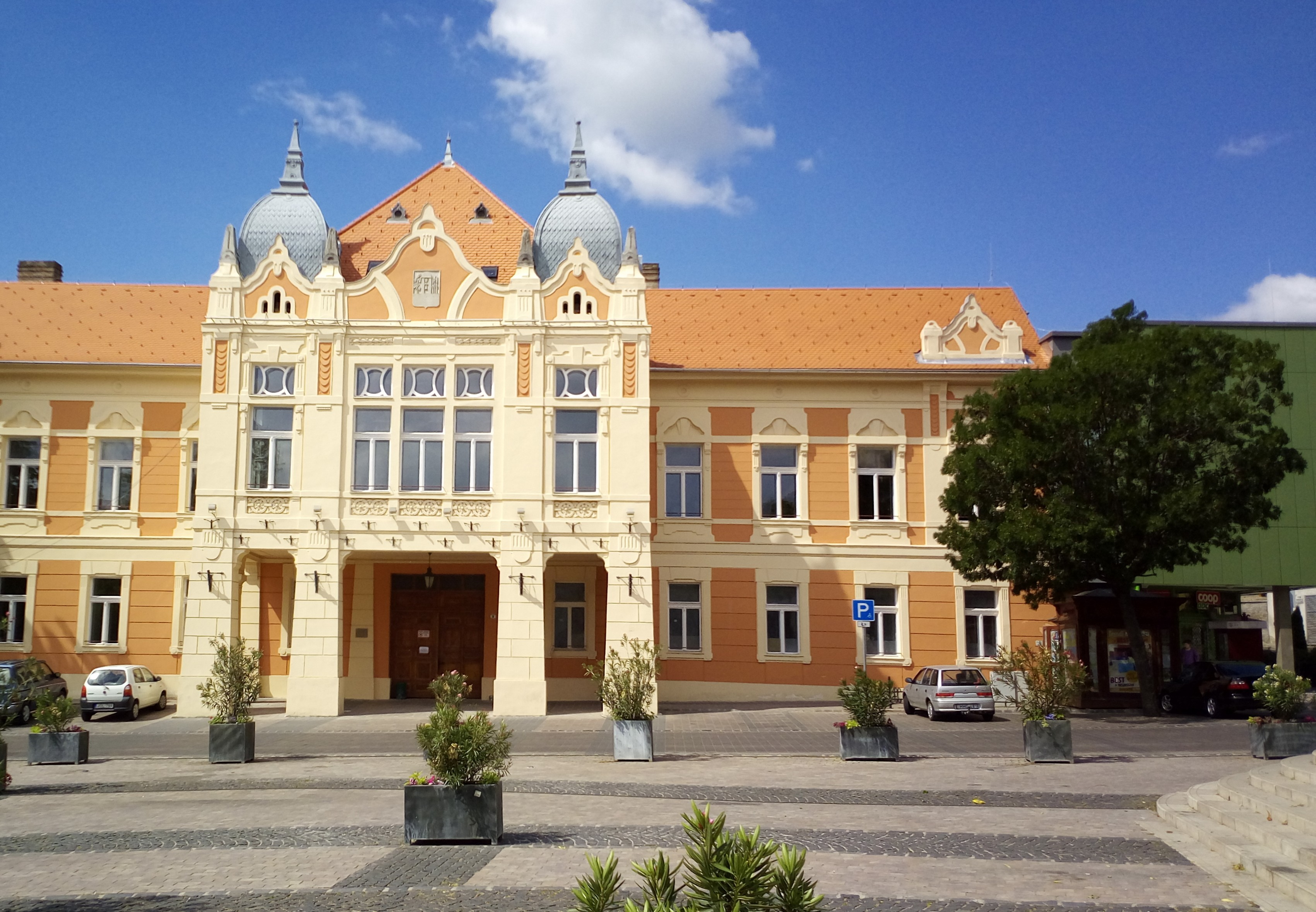
Town hall

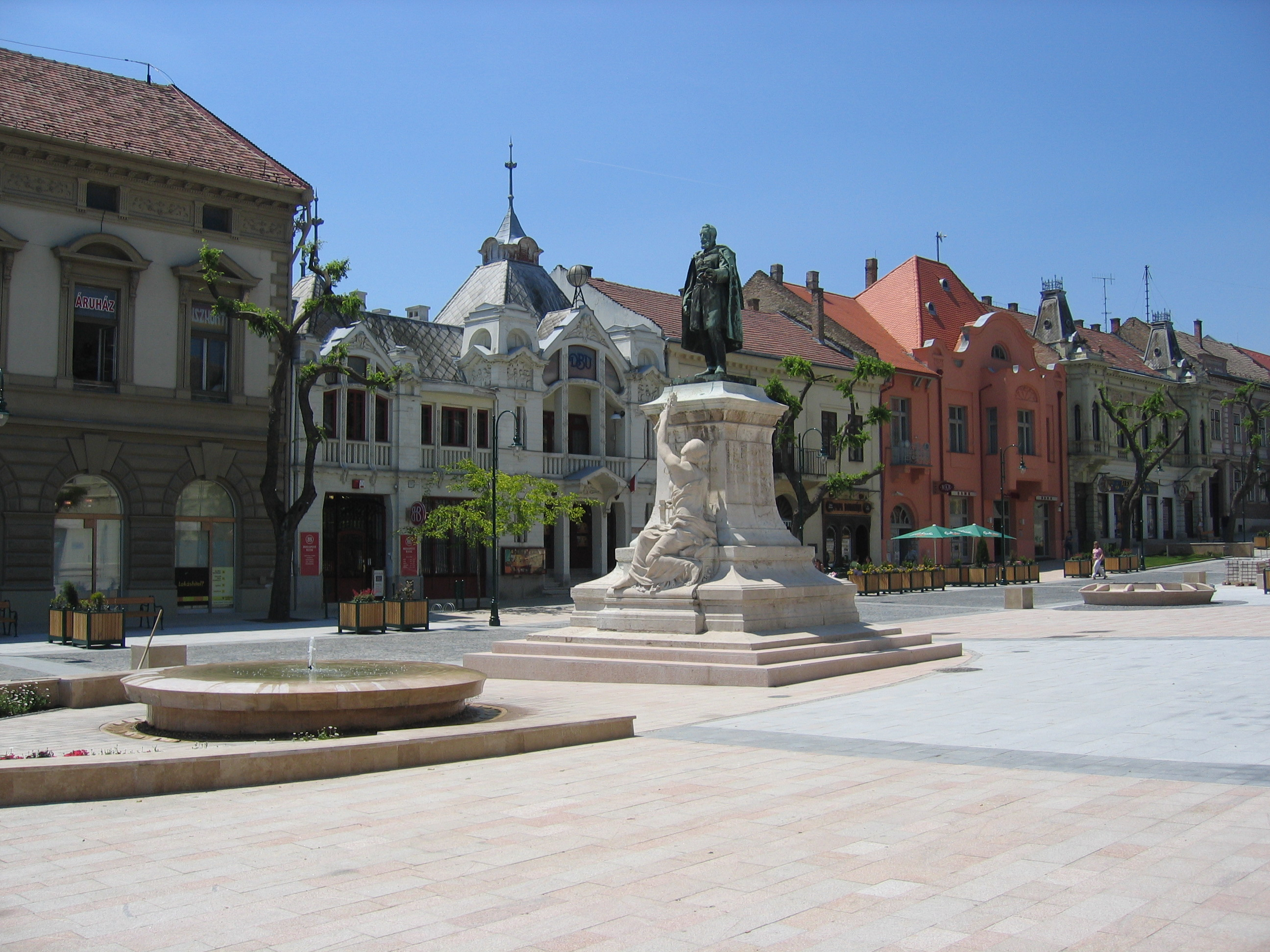
City centre

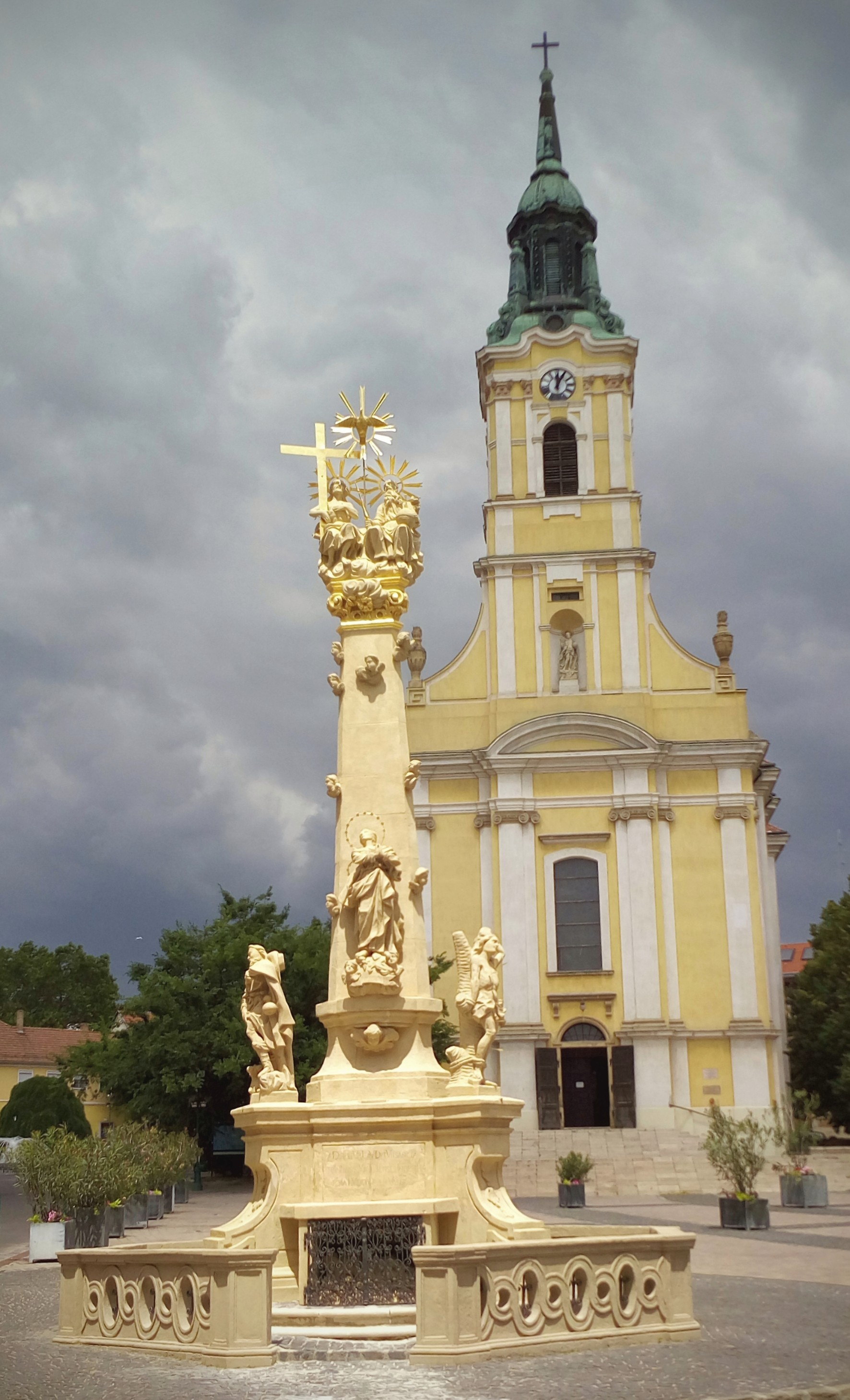
Trinity statue and the catholic church.

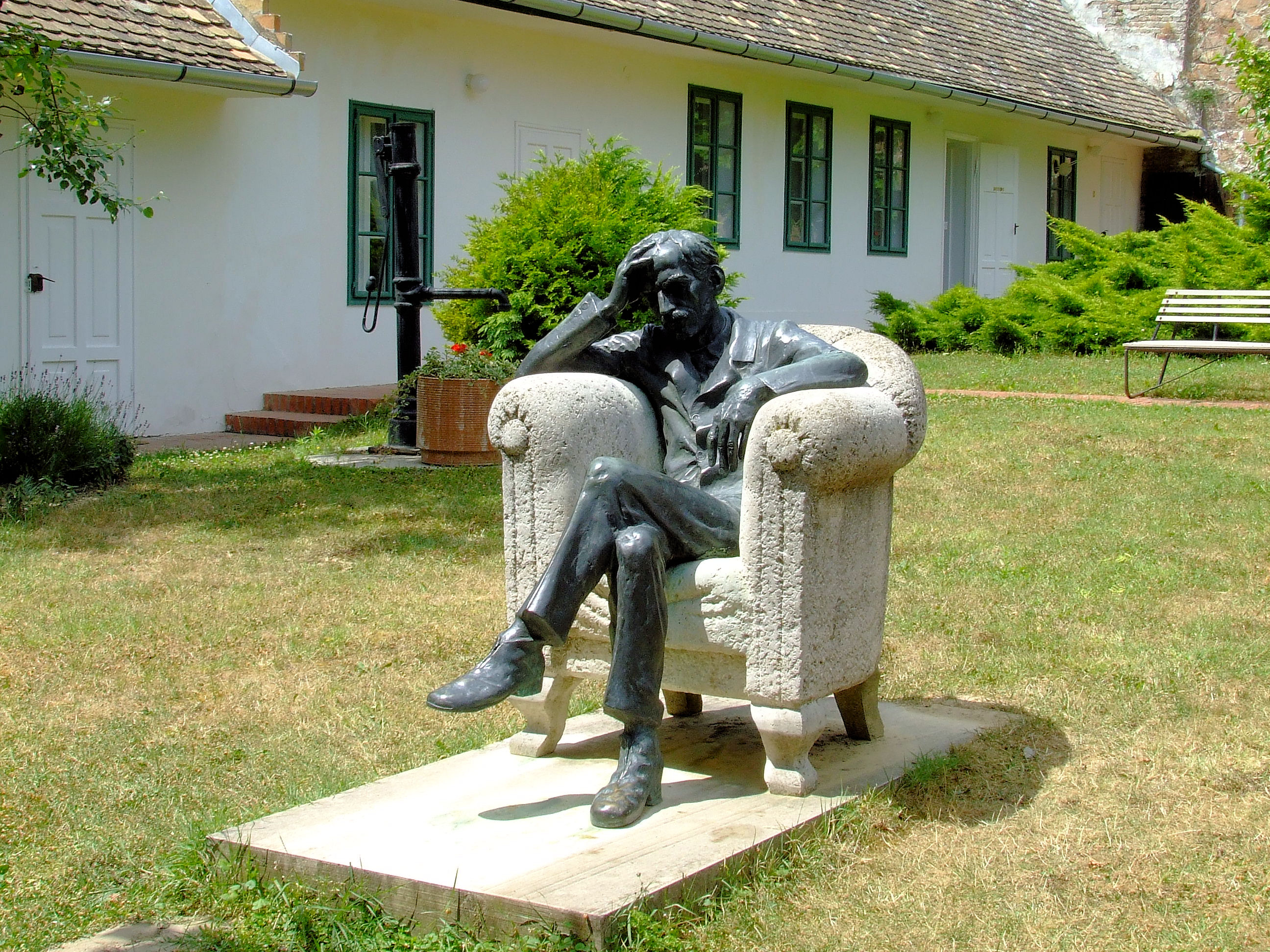
Babits Memorial House

Szekszárd was first mentioned in 1015. The Benedictine monastery of the town was founded by King Béla I in 1061.

During the reign of King Matthias, Szekszárd was the estate of Bishop John, who was involved in a conspiracy against the king. Because of this, King Matthias ordered the castle of Szekszárd to be demolished.

In 1485, Szekszárd was already a significant town, holding five market days a year, but during the Turkish ascendancy of Hungary, the town became deserted and the monastery was destroyed.

By the 18th century, Szekszárd was again a significant town, it became a county seat (of Tolna), and got a coat of arms. The town was destroyed by a fire in 1794, but it could not stop the town's development. Most of the important buildings—including the town hall, the County Hall and several churches—were built during the 19th century. By this time, Szekszárd already had 14,000 residents.

Mihály Babits, an important Hungarian poet was born in Szekszárd in 1883.

During World War II, Szekszárd was captured by Soviet troops of the 3rd Ukrainian Front on 30 November 1944 as part of the Budapest Offensive.

In 1994, Szekszárd was granted the rank of city with county rights, in accordance with a new law stating that all county seats are cities with county rights. (Previously only cities with a population over 50,000 were granted county rights, and Szekszárd was one of only two county seats that had a smaller population than 50,000; the other was Salgótarján).

== Transportation ==
Szekszárd lies on a railway line Rétszilas - Bátaszék and on a junction of main roads No. 6, 56, 63 and 65. Motorways M6 and M9 cross each other near the city. There also are local bus lines for city transportation operated by Volánbusz.

== Main sights ==
- Old county hall (neo-Classical style)
- Augusz manor (Franz Liszt was a guest here)
- Deutsche Bühne Ungarn
- Birthplace of Mihály Babits, Museums
- Birthplace of Valéria Dienes
- Ruins of Benedictine monastery
- János Garay Square and statue

== Twin towns – sister cities ==
Szekszárd is twinned with:

- Bečej, Serbia (1975)
- Bezons, France (1967)
- Bietigheim-Bissingen, Germany (1989)
- Făget, Romania (1998)
- Jajce, Bosnia and Herzegovina (2016)
- Lugoj, Romania (1993)
- Province of Ravenna, Italy (1996)
- Tornio, Finland (1986)
- Waregem, Belgium (1993)

== Notable people ==
- Károly Escher, photographer
- Mihály Babits, poet
- János Garay, poet
- Attila Fiola, footballer
- János Hahn, footballer
- Ferenc Ficza, racing driver

== Sport ==
The women's basketball team Atomerőmű Szekszárd play in the Nemzeti Bajnokság is the premier tier of Hungarian basketball. Szekszárdi UFC play in the Nemzeti Bajnokság III, the third tier of Hungarian football.

== See also ==
- Gemenc forest
