= Imre Palló =

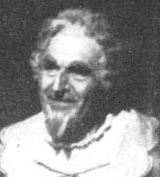
Imre Palló Portrait

Imre Palló (23 October 1891 in Mátisfalva, Transylvania – 25 January 1978 in Budapest) was a Hungarian baritone, and later opera house manager.

Palló studied in Budapest with Georg Anthes and in Italy with Mario Sammarco. His Budapest debut was as Alfio at the Royal Opera House in 1917, where he went on to sing many lyric baritone roles, such as Posa, Luna, Falstaff and Simon Boccanegra, in a career lasting over 35 years. He created leading roles in both Háry János and Székelyfonó by Kodály, and sang in Bartok’s Cantata profana under Ernő Dohnányi in 1936.

The Kossuth Prize was awarded to him in 1949. He was briefly Intendant at the State Opera in Budapest.

Palló's recordings, dating from 1928 to 1961, include songs and excerpts from works by Balázs, Bartók, Erkel, Kodály; operatic arias by Verdi, Wagner and Mussorgsky, among others.

His son (same name, born 1941) was a conductor at New York City Opera and Frankfurt Opera.
