= Jahodná =

Jahodná Pozsonyeperjes
- Municipality
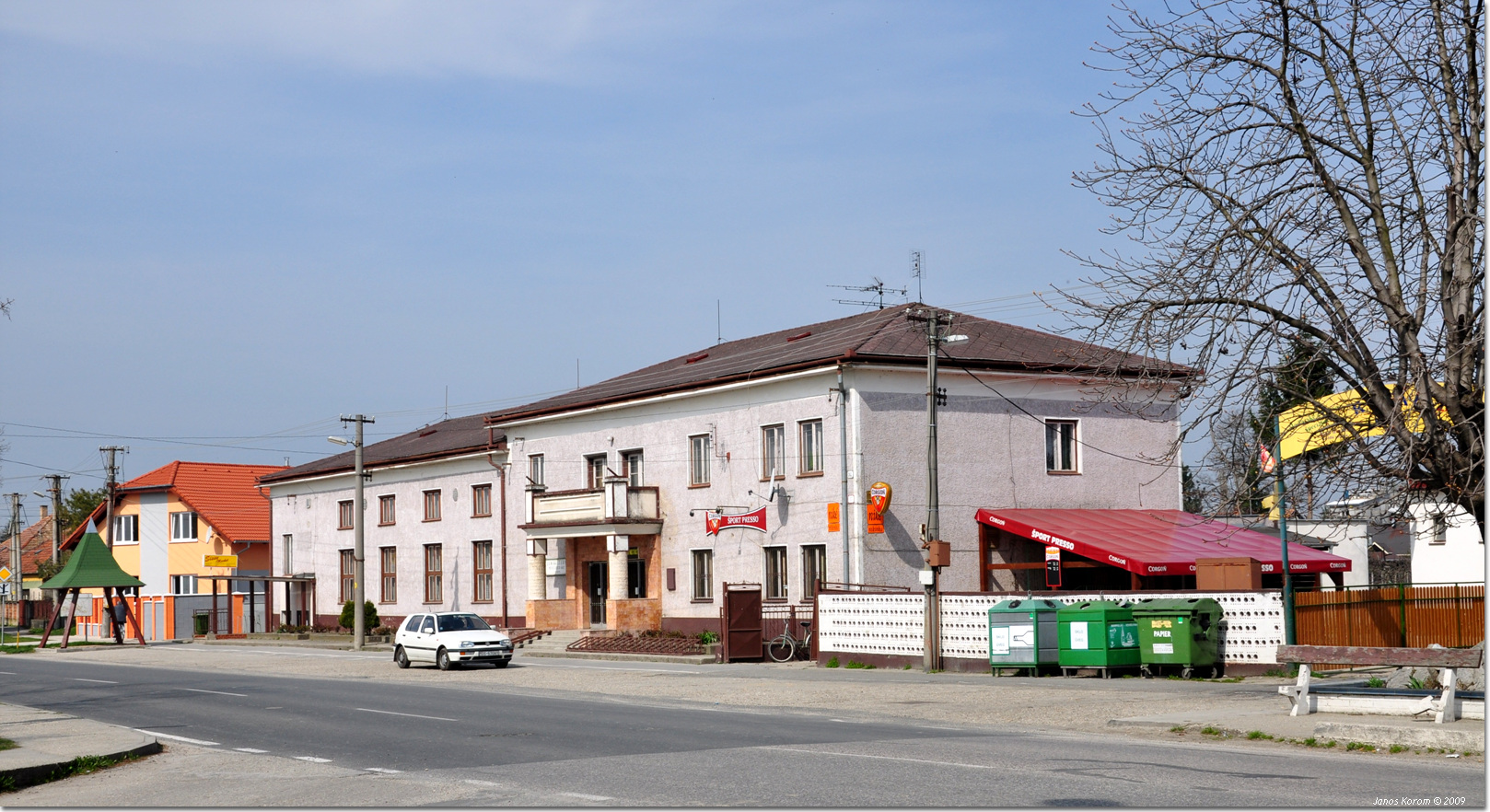

- Flag

- Location of Jahodná in the Trnava Region Location of Jahodná in Slovakia
- Coordinates: 48.05°N 17.70°E
- Country: Slovakia
- Region: Trnava Region
- District: Dunajská Streda District
- First mentioned: 1539

Government
  - Mayor: Jarmila Csiba

Area
  - Total: 15.69 km^{2} (6.06 sq mi)
- Elevation: 114 m (374 ft)

Population (2025)
  - Total: 1,705

Ethnicity
  - Hungarians: 94,03 %
  - Slovaks: 4,66 %
- Time zone: UTC+1 (CET)
  - Summer (DST): UTC+2 (CEST)
- Postal code: 930 21
- Area code: +421 31
- Vehicle registration plate (until 2022): DS
- Website: www.obecjahodna.sk

Jahodná (Hungarian: Pozsonyeperjes, pronounced [ˈpoʒoɲɛpɛrjɛʃ]) is a village and municipality in the Dunajská Streda District in the Trnava Region of south-west Slovakia.

== Geography ==
The municipality lies at an altitude of 114 metres (374 ft) and covers an area of 15.69 km^{2} (6.06 sq mi) (2025). The bigger part of the village lies on the left bank of the small-Danube, but there is also neighborhood on the right bank. The outer rural area on the right bank of the river comprises the following parts: Zsivaj, Huszamér, Kotrási-földek, Akói-gyep, Biffar-kertek, Albert, Völgy-zátony. The left bank rural area is composed of Jártvány, Kertalja, Duna-kert, Arany-ülő, Banga-szer, Öreg-földek, Süveges, Értő, Újmajor, Szügyi-hajlás.

== History ==
In the 9th century, the territory of Jahodná became part of the Kingdom of Hungary. In historical records the village was first mentioned in 1539. In historical records the village was first mentioned in 1539. In 1775, its name was recorded as Eperyes, later Pozsonyeperjes. In 1920, its Slovak name became Bratislavský Eperjes, after 1948, the Slovak name has been Jahodná, the Slovak authorities use Eperjes as its Hungarian name. The formal Hungarian usage is Pozsonyeperjes to disambiguate between Prešov, Eperjes in Hungarian, and this village.

The village was owned by Michael Thurzo in the beginning of 17th century and it was acquired by the Esterházy family in 1640. Several noble families farmed in the village during its history (Mórocz de Nagyabony, Szüllő, Krascsenics, Csiba de Nagyabony, Egrÿ, Üregÿ, Nagy). Until the end of World War I, the village was part of Hungary and fell within the Dunaszerdahely district of Pozsony County. After the Austro-Hungarian army disintegrated in November 1918, Czechoslovak troops occupied the area. After the Treaty of Trianon of 1920, the village became officially part of Czechoslovakia. In November 1938, the First Vienna Award granted the area to Hungary and it was held by Hungary until 1945. After Soviet occupation in 1945, Czechoslovak administration returned and the village became officially part of Czechoslovakia in 1947.

== Population ==
Population statistic (10 years)
Year	1995	2005	2015	2025
Count	1423	1462	1539	1705
Difference		+2.74%	+5.26%	+10.78%

Population statistic
Year	2024	2025
Count	1666	1705
Difference		+2.34%

It has a population of 1705 people (31 December 2025).

=== Ethnicity ===
Census 2021 (1+ %)
Ethnicity	Number	Fraction
Hungarian	1385	83.73%
Slovak	300	18.13%
Not found out	64	3.86%
Total	1654	

In year 2021 was 1654 people by ethnicity 1385 as Hungarian, 300 as Slovak, 64 as Not found out, 11 as Czech, 10 as Romani, 8 as Other, 4 as Ukrainian, 3 as Rusyn, 2 as Austrian, 2 as Moravian, 2 as English, 1 as Polish and 1 as Albanian.

Note on population: The difference values of population numbers in the table "Population statistic" and in the sections "Ethnicity" & "Religion" is caused by the use of various statistical methods.

=== Religion ===
Census 2021 (1+ %)
Religion	Number	Fraction
Roman Catholic Church	1254	75.82%
None	281	16.99%
Not found out	38	2.3%
Calvinist Church	25	1.51%
Total	1654	

In year 2021 was 1654 people by religion 1254 from Roman Catholic Church, 281 from None, 38 from Not found out, 25 from Calvinist Church, 14 from Greek Catholic Church, 9 from Eastern Orthodox Church, 8 from Christian Congregations in Slovakia, 8 from Evangelical Church, 6 from Other, 3 from Old Catholic Church, 3 from Islam, 2 from Other and not ascertained christian church, 1 from Jehovah's Witnesses, 1 from United Methodist Church and 1 from Buddhism.

== See also ==
- List of municipalities and towns in Slovakia

== Genealogical resources ==
The records for genealogical research are available at the state archive "Statny Archiv in Bratislava, Slovakia"

- Roman Catholic church records (births/marriages/deaths): 1732-1895 (parish A)
- Lutheran church records (births/marriages/deaths): 1823-1946 (parish B)
