= Károly Escher =

Hungarian cinematographer and photographer

Károly Escher (21 October 1890 - 16 February 1966) was a Hungarian photographer. Escher was born in Szekszárd, in the Tolna region of Hungary. He worked as a cinematographer on news reels during the briefly lived Hungarian Soviet Republic. Later he worked for the newspaper Pesti Napló during the 1930s and 1940s. He died at age 75 in Budapest in 1966.

== Filmography ==
- Mackó úr kalandjai (1920)
- Masamód (1920) ... Masa's Way
- A Szerelem mindent legyöz (1920)

== Awards ==
- 1938 Venice Biennale Silver medal.
