= Emma Sándor =

Hungarian composer (1863–1958)

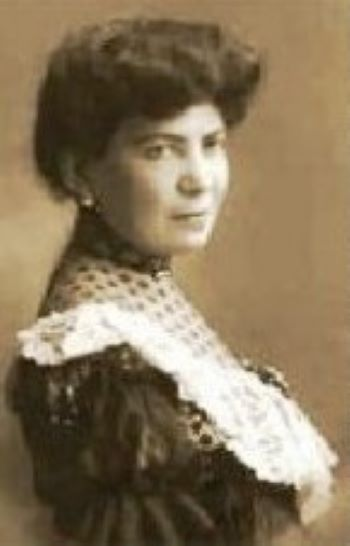
- Born: 17 March 1863
- Died: 22 November 1958 (aged 95)
- Occupations: composer; folklorist; translator
- Known for: collecting folk songs
- Spouses: Henrik Gruber; Zoltán Kodály

Emma Sándor (17 March 1863 Baja – 22 November 1958 Budapest) was a Hungarian composer, folklorist, and translator. Her brother was Pál Sándor, a member of parliament.

== Life ==
Her father was merchant Móric Schlesinger and her mother Sarlolta Deutsch, both of Jewish descent. In 1883, she married the merchant Henrik Gruber. She learned to play the piano and sing, and around the turn of the century, she knew the most important personalities of Budapest's musical life. From 1903, she studied composition with Béla Bartók, then in 1905–06 with Zoltán Kodály. She held a musical salon.

In 1910, she married Zoltán Kodály in Budapest, with whom she lived the rest of her life and worked with him. In 1912, they went on a folk song collecting trip.

She collected folk songs: she processed the Numbers 34 and 35 of Hungarian folk music. Some of her themes were also covered by Bartók, Dohnányi and Kodály. She translated the texts of many ballads and folk songs into German. Her works are mainly piano works.
