= Veľké Blahovo =

Veľké Blahovo Nagyabony
- Municipality
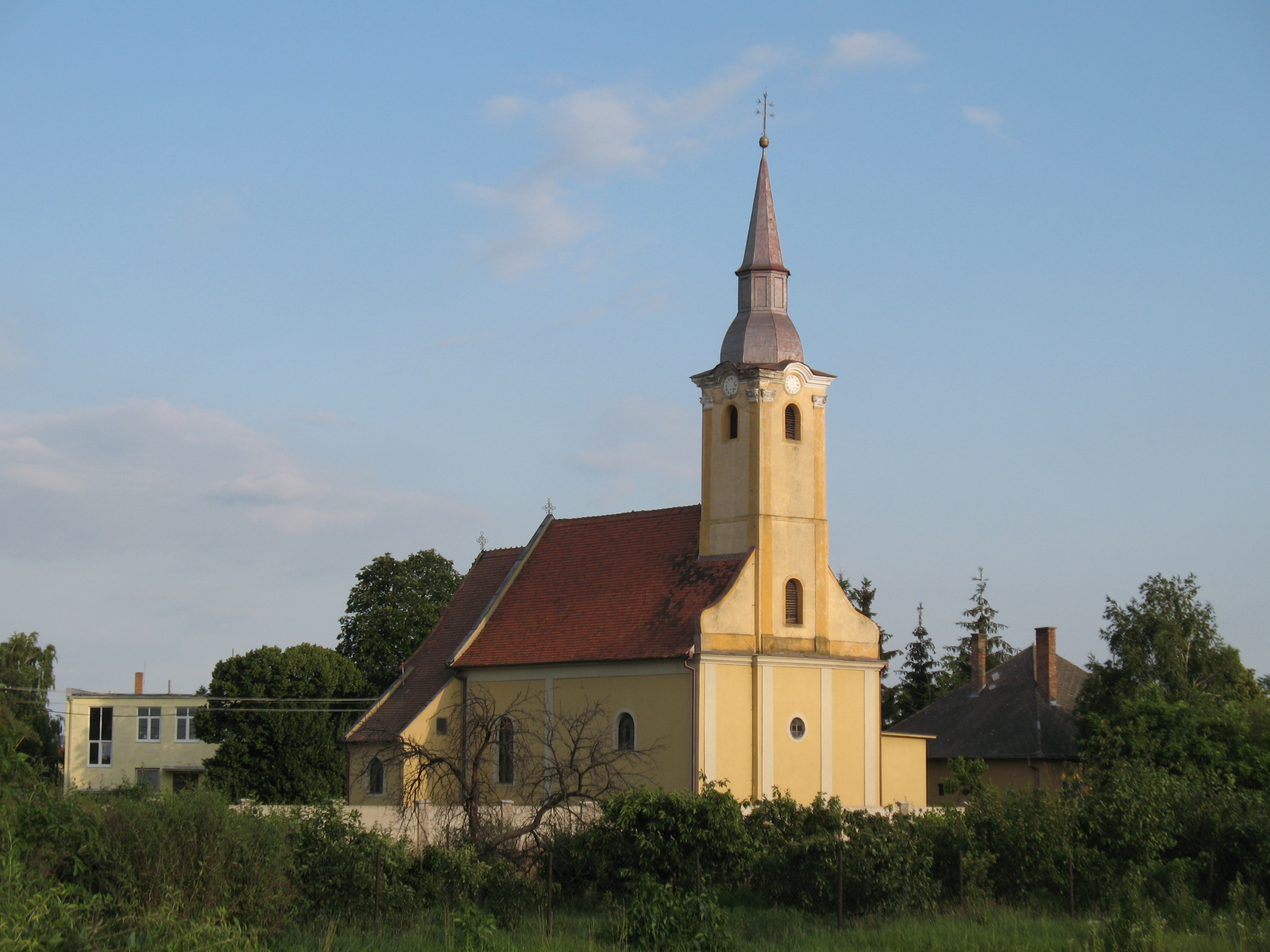
- Church of Holy Trinity

- Flag

- Location of Veľké Blahovo in the Trnava Region Location of Veľké Blahovo in Slovakia
- Coordinates: 48.01°N 17.58°E
- Country: Slovakia
- Region: Trnava Region
- District: Dunajská Streda District
- First mentioned: 1162

Government
  - Mayor: Júlia Gányovicsová (Ind.)

Area
  - Total: 18.13 km^{2} (7.00 sq mi)
- Elevation: 116 m (381 ft)

Population (2025)
  - Total: 1,569

Ethnicity
  - Hungarians: 85,99 %
  - Slovaks: 10,6 %
- Time zone: UTC+1 (CET)
  - Summer (DST): UTC+2 (CEST)
- Postal code: 930 01
- Area code: +421 31
- Vehicle registration plate (until 2022): DS
- Website: www.velkeblahovo.sk

Veľké Blahovo (Hungarian: Nagyabony, pronounced [ˈnɒɟɒboɲ]) is a village and municipality in the Dunajská Streda District in the Trnava Region of south-west Slovakia.

Until 1899 its Hungarian name was Nagy-Abony, then Nemesabony, but recently the Nagyabony form has come into usage. Its historical Slovak name was Veľké Aboň.

== History ==
It is one of the oldest Hungarian settlements of the region. The village was first recorded in 1162 as terra Oboni. It was owned by several noble families during its history (Csiba, Mórocz, Csomor, Rácz, Gazdagh, Rényi, Varga, Fehér, Nagy the landowners of Veľko Blahovo). Until the end of World War I, it was part of Hungary and fell within the Dunaszerdahely district of Pozsony County. After the Austro-Hungarian army disintegrated in November 1918, Czechoslovak troops occupied the area. After the Treaty of Trianon of 1920, the village became officially part of Czechoslovakia. In November 1938, the First Vienna Award granted the area to Hungary and it was held by Hungary until 1945. The present-day municipality was formed in 1940 by unifying the three component villages. After Soviet occupation in 1945, Czechoslovak administration returned and the village became officially part of Czechoslovakia in 1947.

== Population ==
Population statistic (10 years)
Year	1995	2005	2015	2025
Count	1223	1322	1566	1569
Difference		+8.09%	+18.45%	+0.19%

Population statistic
Year	2024	2025
Count	1579	1569
Difference		−0.63%

It has a population of 1569 people (31 December 2025).

In 1910, the village had 999 inhabitants, mostly Hungarian.

=== Ethnicity ===
Census 2021 (1+ %)
Ethnicity	Number	Fraction
Hungarian	1090	68.59%
Slovak	371	23.34%
Not found out	180	11.32%
Romani	47	2.95%
Total	1589	

In year 2021 was 1589 people by ethnicity 1090 as Hungarian, 371 as Slovak, 180 as Not found out, 47 as Romani, 7 as Czech, 5 as Ukrainian, 3 as Russian, 3 as German, 2 as Italian, 2 as Rusyn, 1 as Jewish, 1 as Serbian and 1 as Austrian.

Note on population: The difference values of population numbers in the table "Population statistic" and in the sections "Ethnicity" & "Religion" is caused by the use of various statistical methods.

=== Religion ===
Census 2021 (1+ %)
Religion	Number	Fraction
Roman Catholic Church	915	57.58%
None	269	16.93%
Not found out	168	10.57%
Calvinist Church	159	10.01%
Evangelical Church	36	2.27%
Greek Catholic Church	21	1.32%
Total	1589	

In year 2021 was 1589 people by religion 915 from Roman Catholic Church, 269 from None, 168 from Not found out, 159 from Calvinist Church, 36 from Evangelical Church, 21 from Greek Catholic Church, 8 from Christian Congregations in Slovakia, 4 from Ad hoc movements, 3 from Other, 2 from Jehovah's Witnesses, 1 from Jewish community, 1 from Eastern Orthodox Church, 1 from Other and not ascertained christian church and 1 from Islam.

== Geography ==
The municipality lies at an altitude of 116 metres (381 ft) and covers an area of 18.13 km^{2} (7.00 sq mi) (2025).
