= Holice, Dunajská Streda District =

Holice Gelle
- Municipality
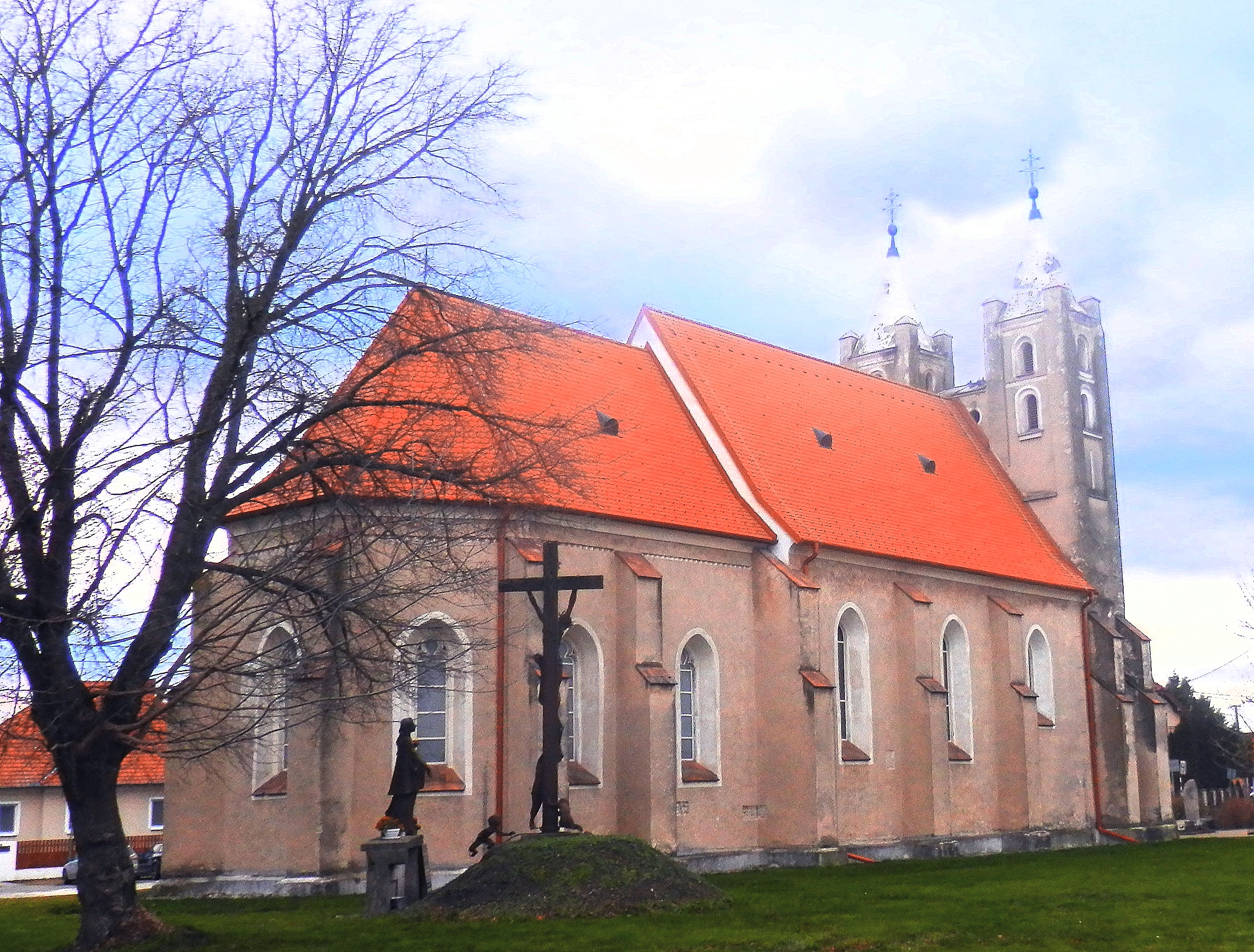
- local church

- Flag

- Location of Holice in the Trnava Region Location of Holice in Slovakia
- Coordinates: 47°59′49″N 17°29′01″E
- Country: Slovakia
- Region: Trnava Region
- District: Dunajská Streda District
- First mentioned: 1245

Government
  - Mayor: Ondřej Výborný

Area
  - Total: 23.97 km^{2} (9.25 sq mi)
- Elevation: 120 m (390 ft)

Population (2025)
  - Total: 2,149

Ethnicity
- Time zone: UTC+1 (CET)
  - Summer (DST): UTC+2 (CEST)
- Postal code: 930 34
- Area code: +421 31
- Vehicle registration plate (until 2022): DS
- Website: www.gelle.sk

Holice (Hungarian: Gelle, pronounced [ˈɡɛlːɛ]) is a village and municipality in the Dunajská Streda District in the Trnava Region of south-west Slovakia.

== Component villages ==
The municipality consists of eight formerly independent villages.

In Slovak	In Hungarian
Kostolná Gala	Egyházgelle
Stará Gala	Ógelle
Cséfa	Cséfa
Čentőfa	Csentőfa
Malá Budafa	Kisbudafa
Veľká Budafa	Nagybudafa
Póšfa	Pósfa
Beketfa	Beketfa

== Geography ==
The municipality lies at an altitude of 120 metres (390 ft) and covers an area of 23.97 km^{2} (9.25 sq mi) (2025).

== History ==
In the 9th century, the territory of Holice became part of the Kingdom of Hungary. In historical records the village was first mentioned in 1245. After the Austro-Hungarian army disintegrated in November 1918, Czechoslovak troops occupied the area, later acknowledged internationally by the Treaty of Trianon. Between 1938 and 1945 Holice once more became part of Miklós Horthy's Hungary through the First Vienna Award. Village Holice was created in 1940 by joining the settlements Beketfa, Kostolná Gala, Stará Gala, and Póšfa. From 1945 until the Velvet Divorce, it was part of Czechoslovakia. Since then it has been part of Slovakia.

== Population ==
Population statistic (10 years)
Year	1995	2005	2015	2025
Count	1807	1832	1985	2149
Difference		+1.38%	+8.35%	+8.26%

Population statistic
Year	2024	2025
Count	2143	2149
Difference		+0.27%

It has a population of 2149 people (31 December 2025).

=== Ethnicity ===
Census 2021 (1+ %)
Ethnicity	Number	Fraction
Hungarian	1795	83.72%
Slovak	393	18.33%
Not found out	55	2.56%
Total	2144	

In year 2021 was 2144 people by ethnicity 1795 as Hungarian, 393 as Slovak, 55 as Not found out, 12 as Other, 7 as Czech, 4 as Ukrainian, 3 as Polish, 2 as Serbian, 2 as Rusyn, 1 as Russian, 1 as Austrian, 1 as German, 1 as Bulgarian and 1 as English.

Note on population: The difference values of population numbers in the table "Population statistic" and in the sections "Ethnicity" & "Religion" is caused by the use of various statistical methods.

=== Religion ===
Census 2021 (1+ %)
Religion	Number	Fraction
Roman Catholic Church	1673	78.03%
None	326	15.21%
Calvinist Church	45	2.1%
Not found out	40	1.87%
Evangelical Church	26	1.21%
Total	2144	

In year 2021 was 2144 people by religion 1673 from Roman Catholic Church, 326 from None, 45 from Calvinist Church, 40 from Not found out, 26 from Evangelical Church, 11 from Greek Catholic Church, 7 from Eastern Orthodox Church, 6 from Christian Congregations in Slovakia, 4 from Other, 2 from Other and not ascertained christian church, 2 from Seventh-day Adventist Church, 1 from Jewish community and 1 from Old Catholic Church.

== See also ==
- List of municipalities and towns in Slovakia

== Genealogical resources ==
The records for genealogical research are available at the state archive "Statny Archiv in Bratislava, Slovakia"

- Roman Catholic church records (births/marriages/deaths): 1689-1905 (parish A)
