= Zsolt Harsányi =

Hungarian writer

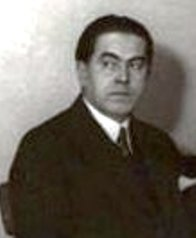
Harsányi, date unknown

Zsolt Harsányi (27 January 1887 – 29 November 1943), also known as Zsolt von Harsanyi or Zsolt de Harsanyi, was a Hungarian author, dramatist, translator and writer.

Born in Korompa, Upper Hungary (today Krompachy in Slovakia), Harsányi descended from a long line of Hungarian writers. At seventeen years of age, he received a student award from the Hungarian Academy of Sciences.

His long career produced hundreds of dramatic and literary works, including short and full-length plays, musical comedies, and historical fiction novels.
