= Zoltán Kodály =

Hungarian composer (1882–1967)

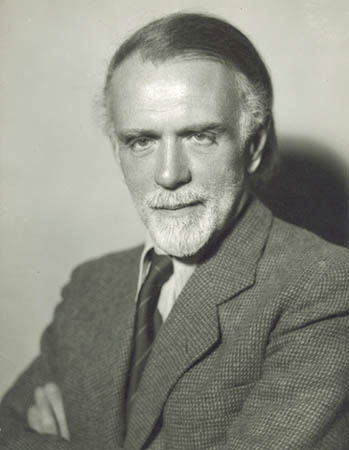
- Kodály in the 1930s
- Born: 16 December 1882; Kecskemét, Austria-Hungary
- Died: 6 March 1967 (aged 84); Budapest, Hungary
- Education: Ferenc Liszt Academy of Music
- Occupations: Composer; Ethnomusicologist; Music pedagogue
- Known for: Kodály Method

Zoltán Kodály (UK: /ˈkoʊdaɪ/, US: /koʊˈdaɪ/; Hungarian: Kodály Zoltán, pronounced [ˈkodaːj ˈzoltaːn]; 16 December 1882 – 6 March 1967) was a Hungarian composer, ethnomusicologist, music pedagogue, linguist, and philosopher. He is well known internationally as the creator of the Kodály method of music education.

== Life ==
Born in Kecskemét, Kingdom of Hungary, Austria-Hungary, Kodály learned to play the violin as a child. In 1900, he entered the Department of Languages at the University of Budapest and at the same time Hans von Kössler's composition class at the Royal Hungarian Academy of Music. After completing his studies, he studied in Paris with Charles-Marie Widor for a year.

In 1905, he visited remote villages to collect songs, recording them on phonograph cylinders. In 1906, he wrote a thesis on Hungarian folk song, "Strophic Construction in Hungarian Folksong". At around this time Kodály met fellow composer and compatriot Béla Bartók, whom he took under his wing and introduced to some of the methods involved in folk song collecting. The two became lifelong friends and champions of each other's music.

In 1919, Kodály was appointed alongside Béla Bartók to the Music Directory by the People's Commissariat for Education and Culture in the short-lived Hungarian Soviet Republic.

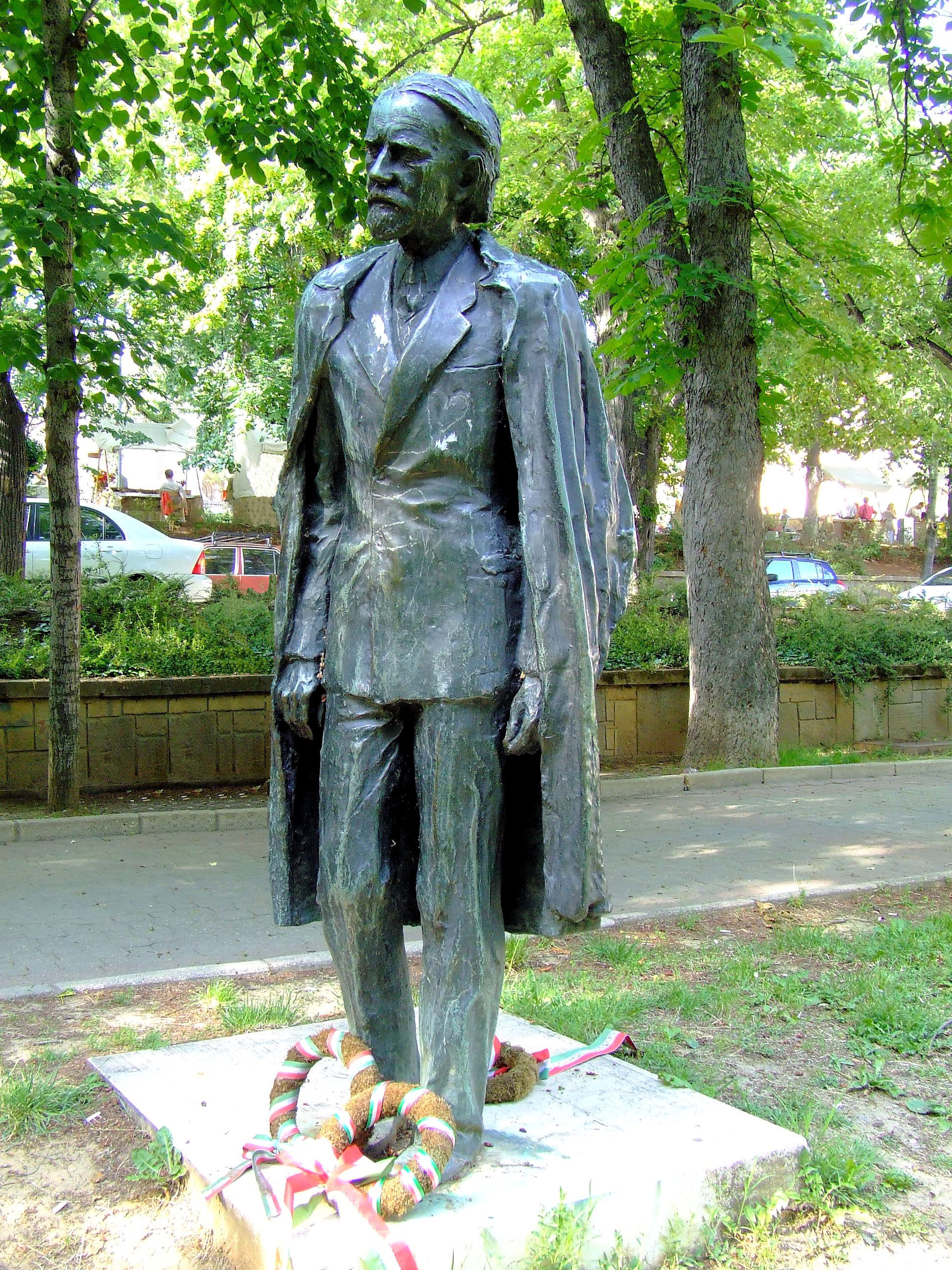
Statue of Kodály at Szent István square in Pécs, Hungary

Duo for violin and cello (Op. 7, 1914)
Performed by members of the U.S. Army Band Strings

Kodály's works are a blend of the western European style of music, including classical, late-romantic, impressionistic and modernist traditions, and the folk music of Hungary (including the Hungarian-inhabited areas of modern-day Slovakia and Romania, as those territories were part of Hungary). Partly because of the Great War and subsequent major geopolitical changes in the region, and partly because of a naturally rather diffident temperament in youth, Kodály had no major public success until 1923. This was the year when one of his best-known pieces, Psalmus Hungaricus, was given its first performance at a concert to celebrate the fiftieth anniversary of the union of Buda and Pest (Bartók's Dance Suite premiered on the same occasion.)

Kodály's first wife was Emma Gruber (née Schlesinger, later Sándor), the dedicatee of Ernő Dohnányi's Waltz for piano with four hands, Op. 3, and Variations and Fugue on a theme by E.G., Op. 4 (1897). Emma died in November 1958, after 48 years of marriage.

Thirteen months later, in December 1959, Kodály married Sarolta Péczely, his 19-year-old student at the Franz Liszt Academy of Music with whom he lived happily until his death in 1967 at the age of 84 in Budapest.

In 1966, Kodály toured the United States and gave a special lecture at Stanford University, where some of his music was performed in his presence.

== Kodály method ==
Beginning in 1935, along with his colleague Jenő Ádám, Kodaly worked on a project to reform music teaching in Hungary's schools, and published several books.

Kodály's music education philosophy can be summarized as:

- Music is for everyone.
- Music teaching should be sequential and begin with the child in mind.
- Children should be taught music from an early age.
- The sequence should be logical and follow the same process children learn language.
- Music classes should be enjoyable and engaging.
- Singing is the first and most valuable tool for learning musical concepts.
- Teachers should pull from quality folk song materials in the "mother tongue" of the students.

The Hungarian music education program that developed in the 1940s became the basis for the Kodály philosophy. Although Kodály himself did not write down a comprehensive method, he did establish a set of principles to follow in music education, and these principles were widely taken up by music teachers (above all in Hungary, but also in many other countries) after World War II.

== Legacy and memorials ==
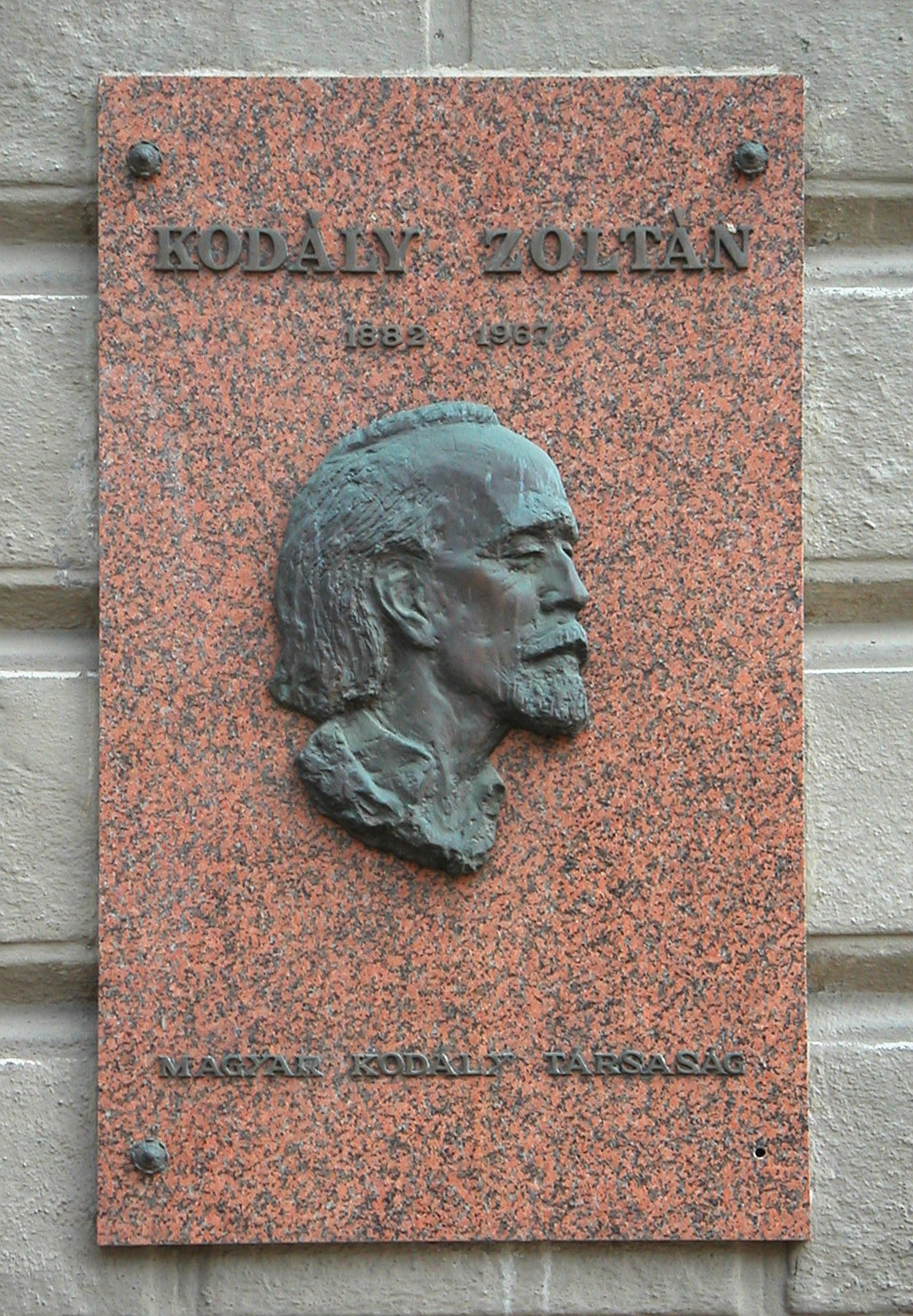
Commemorative plaque in Andrássy Avenue, Budapest

The city of Pécs commissioned a life-sized bronze statue, located in Szent István square, in his honour in 1976. The sculptor, Imre Varga, positioned the statue so that its back is to the Cathedral and it faces a former children's playground, reflecting the central importance to Kodály of musical education for children. He is depicted as an aged man, walking among horse-chestnut trees.

In 2016, another life-size bronze statue of sitting Kodály by the same sculptor Imre Varga was installed in the northern part of the Buda Castle park. 47.5052182N, 19.0319091E

At one point during the Hungarian Revolution of 1956, the Workers Councils proposed to form a government with Kodály as president "because of his great national and international reputation."

Kodaly is mentioned in the Spielberg movie Close Encounters of the Third Kind when Francois Truffaut playing the part of scientist Claude Lacombe illustrates the physical hand gestures (solfege hand signs) that will match the movie's famous five-note musical motif. Lacombe attributes them to Kodaly when actually they were first invented by 18th Century English Congregationalist minister John Curwen. The movie therefore makes an historical error. However, Kodaly did borrow this hand signaling method as part of his holistic music education framework intended for the musical education of children.

== Selected works ==
Stage works

- Háry János, Op. 15 (1926)
- Székelyfonó (The Spinning Room) (1924–1932)

Orchestral

- Idyll Summer Evening (1906, revised 1929)
- Háry János Suite (1926)
- Dances of Marosszék (1929; orchestration of the 1927 piano set)
- Theatre Overture (1931) (originally intended for Háry János)
- Dances of Galánta (1933)
- Variations on a Hungarian folk song (Fölszállott a páva, or The Peacock Roared, 1939)
- Concerto for Orchestra (1940)
- Symphony in memoriam Toscanini (1961)

Chamber or instrumental

- Adagio for Violin (or Viola or Cello) and Piano (1905)
- Intermezzo for String Trio (1905)
- Seven Pieces for Piano, Op. 11 (1918)
- String Quartet No. 1 in C minor, Op. 2 (1909)
- Cello Sonata, Op. 4 (1910)
- Duo for Violin and Cello, Op. 7 (1914)
- Sonata for Solo Cello, Op. 8 (1915)
- Capriccio for Solo Cello (1915)
- String Quartet No. 2, Op. 10 (1916–1918)
- Szerenád (Serenade) for 2 Violins and Viola, Op. 12 (1920)
- Marosszéki táncok (Dances of Marosszék, piano, 1927)
- Organ Prelude Pange lingua (1931)
- Organoeida ad missam lectam (Csendes mise, organ, 1944 but reworked later, around 1965) : Introitus, Kyrie, Gloria, Credo, Sanctus, Benedictus, Agnus and Ite, missa est
- Epigrammak (1954)

Choral

- Este (Evening) (1904)
- Psalmus Hungaricus, Op. 13 (1923)
- Mátrai képek (Mátra Pictures) for choir a cappella (1931)
- Jézus és a kufárok (Jesus and the Traders) for choir a cappella (1934)
- Ének Szent István királyhoz (Hymn to St Stephen) (1938)
- Te Deum for Buda Castle (1936)
- Te Deum of Sándor Sík for choir a cappella (1961)
- Missa brevis for choir and organ (1942, orchestrated 1948)
- Laudes organi for choir and organ (1966)
- Adventi ének (Veni, veni, Emmanuel) for choir a cappella
- 114. Genfi zsoltár (Psalm 114 from the Genevan Psalter) for choir and organ

== See also ==
- Solfège, a music education method used to teach pitch and sight singing
