= Fejér County 5th constituency =

Constituency in Hungary (2012-)

Fejér County 5th constituency (Sárbogárd)
- Constituency for the National Assembly
- Location of Fejér county 05 within Fejér county

- Location of Fejér county within Hungary
- County: Fejér
- Electorate: 67,210 (2022)
- Major settlements: Sárbogárd

Current constituency
- Created: 2011 (modified 2024)
- Party: Fidesz–KDNP
- Member: Gábor Varga
- Elected: 2014, 2018, 2022, 2026

The 5th constituency of Fejér County (Hungarian: Fejér megyei 05. számú országgyűlési egyéni választókerület) is one of the single member constituencies of the National Assembly, the national legislature of Hungary. The constituency standard abbreviation: Fejér 05. OEVK.

Since 2014, it has been represented by Gábor Varga of the Fidesz–KDNP party alliance.

== Geography ==
The 5th constituency is located in southern part of Fejér County.

=== List of municipalities ===
The constituency includes the following municipalities:

1. Aba
2. Alap
3. Alsószentiván
4. Baracs
5. Cece
6. Csősz
7. Daruszentmiklós
8. Dég
9. Előszállás
10. Enying
11. Hantos
12. Igar
13. Káloz
14. Kisapostag
15. Kisláng
16. Lajoskomárom
17. Lepsény
18. Mátyásdomb
19. Mezőfalva
20. Mezőkomárom
21. Mezőszentgyörgy
22. Mezőszilas
23. Nagykarácsony
24. Nagylók
25. Sárbogárd
26. Sáregres
27. Sárkeresztúr
28. Sárosd
29. Sárszentágota
30. Seregélyes
31. Soponya
32. Szabadegyháza
33. Szabadhídvég
34. Vajta

== Members ==
The constituency was first represented by Gábor Varga of the Fidesz from 2014, and he was re-elected in 2018, 2022, and 2026.

Election	Member	Party	%	Ref.
2014	Gábor Varga	Fidesz	47.63	
2018	Gábor Varga	Fidesz	55.97	
2022	Gábor Varga	Fidesz	64.55	
2026	Gábor Varga	Fidesz	46.79	
