= Székesfehérvár District =

Székesfehérvár District Székesfehérvári járás
- Districts of Hungary
- Flag Coat of arms

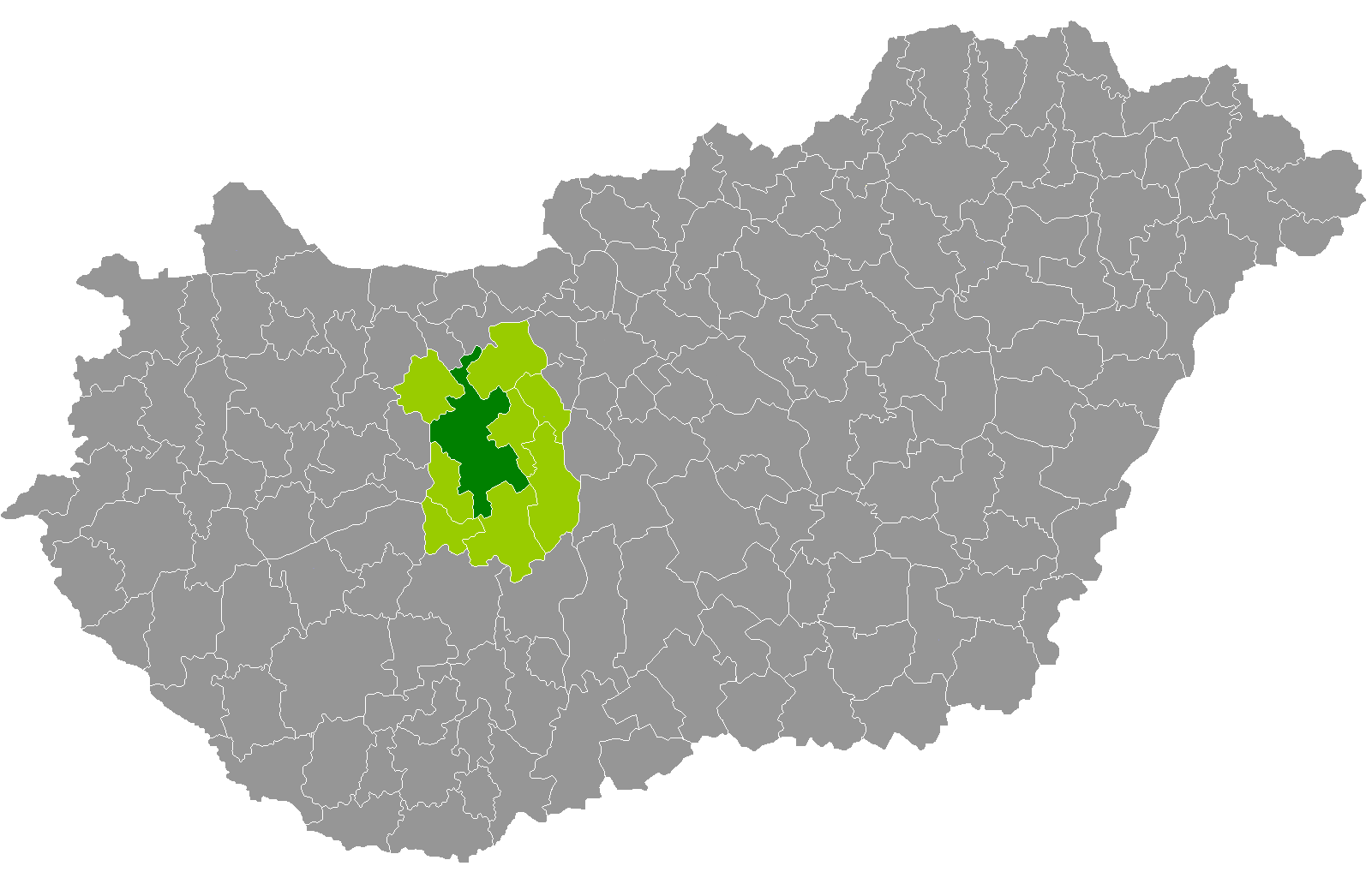
- Székesfehérvár District within Hungary and Fejér County.
- Coordinates: 47.19°N 18.41°E
- Country: Hungary
- County: Fejér
- District seat: Székesfehérvár

Area
  - Total: 1,032.05 km^{2} (398.48 sq mi)
  - Rank: 1st in Fejér

Population (2011 census)
  - Total: 156,935
  - Rank: 1st in Fejér
  - Density: 152/km^{2} (390/sq mi)

Székesfehérvár (Hungarian: Székesfehérvári járás) is a district in central-western part of Fejér County. Székesfehérvár is also the name of the town where the district seat is found. The district is located in the Central Transdanubia Statistical Region.

== Geography ==
Székesfehérvár District borders with Bicske District to the northeast, Gárdony District to the east, Sárbogárd District to the south, Enying District, Balatonalmádi District and Várpalota District (Veszprém County) to the west, Mór District to the northwest. The number of the inhabited places in Székesfehérvár District is 25.

== Municipalities ==
The district has 1 urban county, 2 towns, 4 large villages and 18 villages. (ordered by population, as of 1 January 2012)

- **Aba** (4,619)
- Bakonykúti (134)
- Csór (1,832)
- Csősz (1,044)
- Füle (834) – from (Polgárdi District) 01.01.2015
- Iszkaszentgyörgy (2,032)
- Jenő (1,329) – from (Polgárdi District) 01.01.2015
- Káloz (2,402)
- Kőszárhegy (1,620) – from (Polgárdi District) 01.01.2015
- Lovasberény (2,669)
- Moha (549)
- Nádasdladány (1,749) – from (Polgárdi District) 01.01.2015
- Pátka (1,628)
- **Polgárdi** (6,964) – from (Polgárdi District) 01.01.2015
- Sárkeresztes (1,484)
- Sárkeszi (611)
- Sárosd (3,325)
- Sárszentmihály (3,062)
- Seregélyes (4,560)
- Soponya (2,010)
- Szabadbattyán (4,525)
- **Székesfehérvár** (101,722) – district and county seat
- Tác (1,649)
- Úrhida (2,366)
- Zámoly (2,216)

The bolded municipalities are cities, italics municipalities are large villages.

== See also ==
- List of cities and towns in Hungary
