= Fejér County 2nd constituency =

Constituency in Hungary (2012-)

Fejér County 2nd constituency (Székesfehérvár)
- Constituency for the National Assembly
- Location of Fejér county 02 within Fejér county

- Location of Fejér county within Hungary
- County: Fejér
- Electorate: 69,185 (2018)
- Major settlements: Székesfehérvár

Current constituency
- Created: 2011 (modified 2024)
- Party: Tisza Party
- Member: Mihály Borics
- Elected: 2026

The 2nd constituency of Fejér County (Hungarian: Fejér megyei 02. számú országgyűlési egyéni választókerület) is one of the single member constituencies of the National Assembly, the national legislature of Hungary. The constituency standard abbreviation: Fejér 02. OEVK.

Since 2026, it has been represented by Mihály Borics of the Tisza Party.

== Geography ==
The 2nd constituency is located in north-western part of Fejér County.

=== List of municipalities ===
The constituency includes the following municipalities:

1. Bakonycsernye
2. Bakonykúti
3. Balinka
4. Bodajk
5. Csákberény
6. Csókakő
7. Csór
8. Fehérvárcsurgó
9. Iszkaszentgyörgy
10. Isztimér
11. Kincsesbánya
12. Lovasberény
13. Magyaralmás
14. Moha
15. Mór
16. Nagyveleg
17. Pákozd
18. Pátka
19. Pusztavám
20. Sárkeresztes
21. Söréd
22. Székesfehérvár: Northern part of the city.
23. Zámoly

== Members ==
The constituency was first represented by Gábor Törő of the Fidesz from 2014, and he was re-elected in 2018 and 2022. In the 2026 election, Mihály Borics of the Tisza Party was elected representative.

Election	Member	Party	%	Ref.
2014	Gábor Törő	Fidesz	50.18	
2018	Gábor Törő	Fidesz	53.69	
2022	Gábor Törő	Fidesz	56.01	
2026	Mihály Borics	Tisza Party	53.91	
