= Sárbogárd District =

Sárbogárd District Sárbogárdi járás
- Districts of Hungary
- Coat of arms

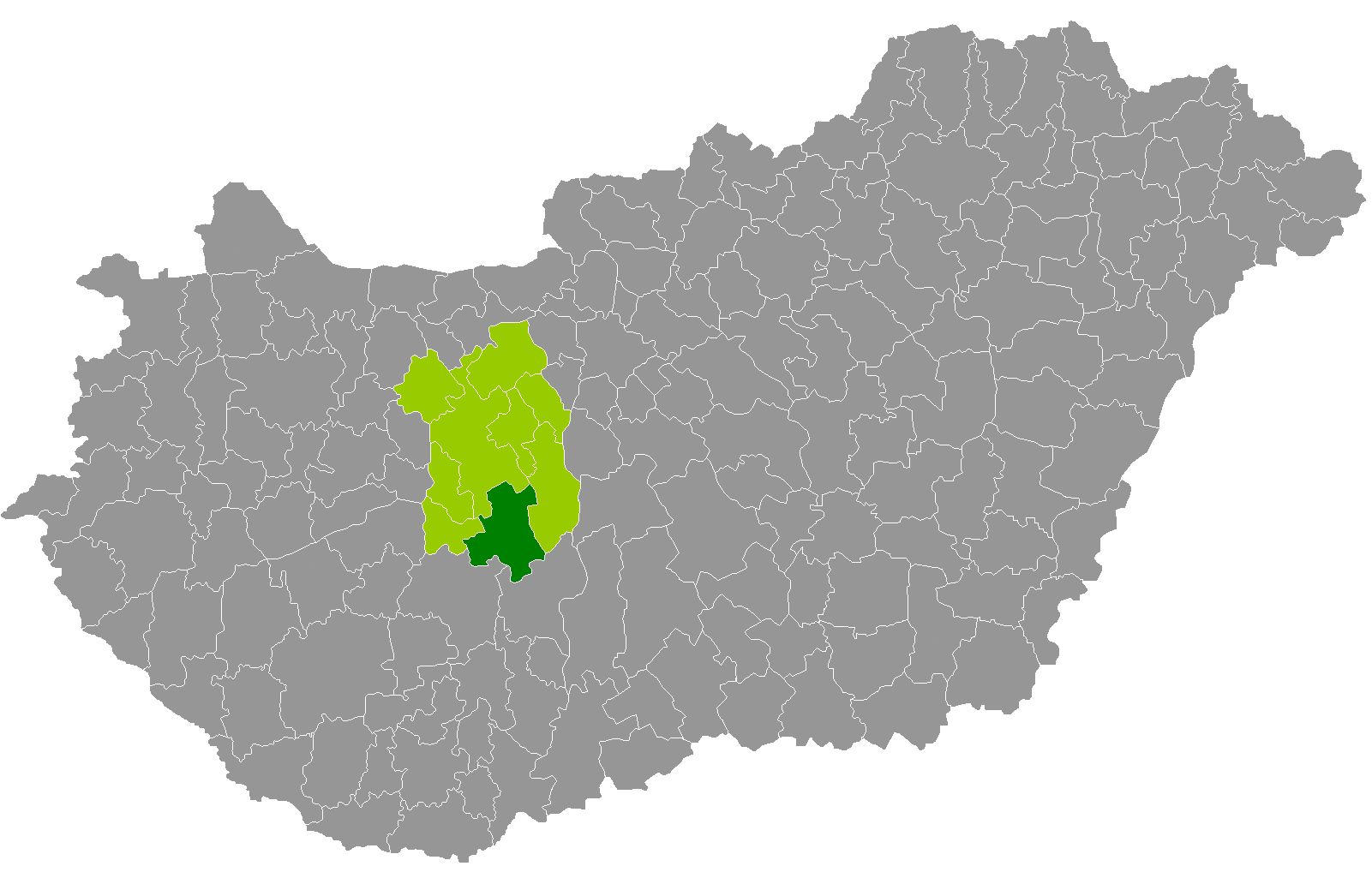
- Sárbogárd District within Hungary and Fejér County.
- Coordinates: 46.88°N 18.62°E
- Country: Hungary
- County: Fejér
- District seat: Sárbogárd

Area
  - Total: 653.52 km^{2} (252.33 sq mi)
  - Rank: 2nd in Fejér

Population (2011 census)
  - Total: 28,296
  - Rank: 6th in Fejér
  - Density: 43/km^{2} (110/sq mi)

Sárbogárd (Hungarian: Sárbogárdi járás) is a district in southern part of Fejér County. Sárbogárd is also the name of the town where the district seat is found. The district is located in the Central Transdanubia Statistical Region.

== Geography ==
Sárbogárd District borders with Székesfehérvár District to the north, Dunaújváros District to the east, Paks District and Tamási District (Tolna County) to the south, Enying District to the west. The number of the inhabited places in Sárbogárd District is 12.

== Municipalities ==
The district has 1 town, 1 large village and 10 villages. (ordered by population, as of 1 January 2012)

- Alap (1,925)
- Alsószentiván (608)
- Cece (2,499)
- Hantos (910)
- Igar (959)
- Mezőszilas (2,068)
- Nagylók (1,059)
- **Sárbogárd** (12,448) – district seat
- Sáregres (752)
- Sárkeresztúr (2,561)
- Sárszentágota (1,346)
- Vajta (1,053)

The bolded municipality is city, italics municipality is large village.

== See also ==
- List of cities and towns in Hungary
