= Mór District =

Mór District Móri járás
- Districts of Hungary
- Coat of arms

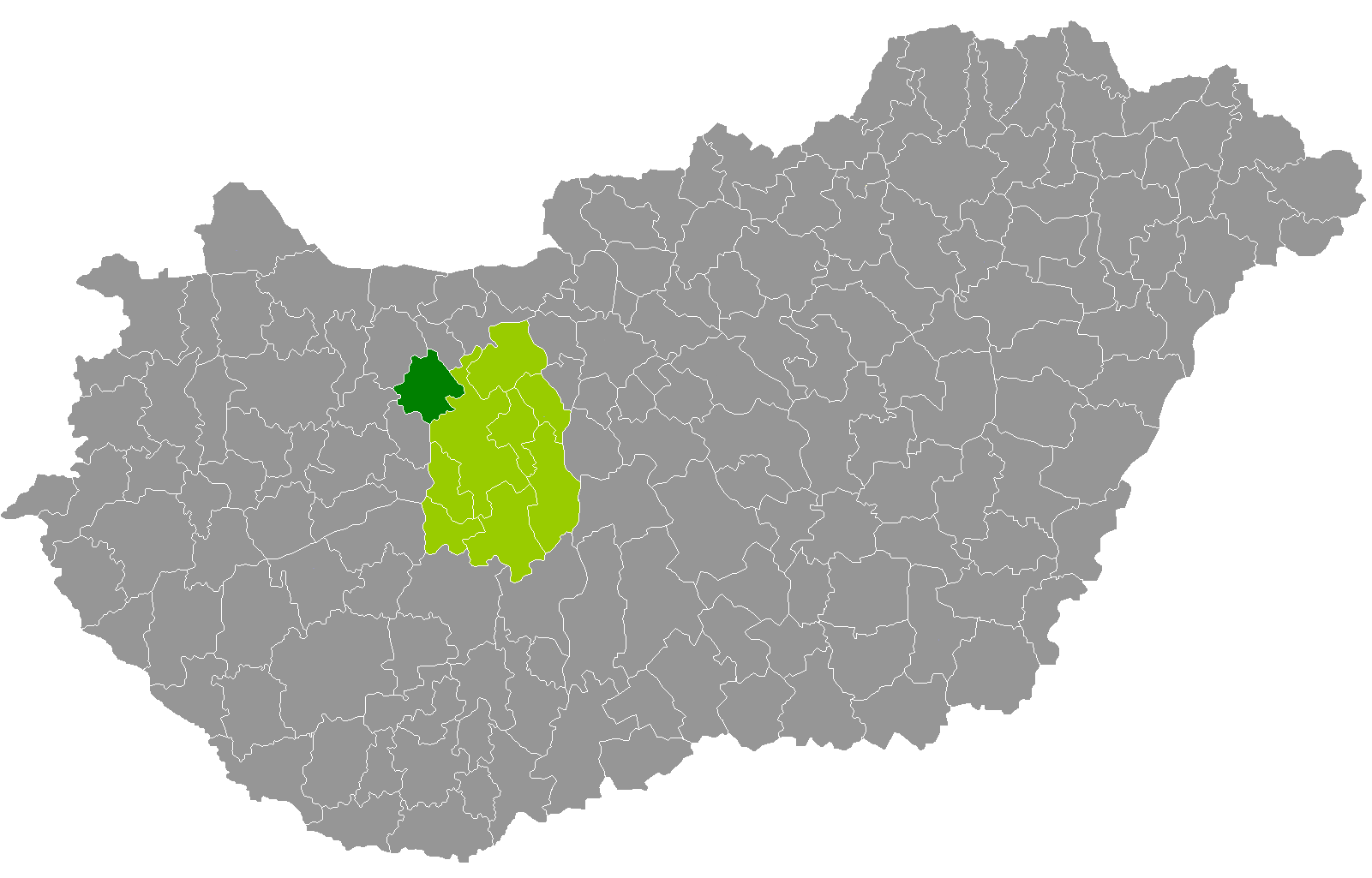
- Mór District within Hungary and Fejér County.
- Coordinates: 47.38°N 18.20°E
- Country: Hungary
- County: Fejér
- District seat: Mór

Area
  - Total: 417.55 km^{2} (161.22 sq mi)
  - Rank: 6th in Fejér

Population (2011 census)
  - Total: 33,070
  - Rank: 4th in Fejér
  - Density: 84/km^{2} (220/sq mi)

Mór (Hungarian: Móri járás) is a district in north-western part of Fejér County. Mór is also the name of the town where the district seat is found. The district is located in the Central Transdanubia Statistical Region.

== Geography ==
Mór District borders with Kisbér District and Oroszlány District (Komárom-Esztergom County) to the north, Bicske District to the east, Székesfehérvár District to the east and south, Várpalota District (Veszprém County) to the southwest, Zirc District (Veszprém County) to the west. The number of the inhabited places in Mór District is 13.

== Municipalities ==
The district has 2 towns and 11 villages. (ordered by population, as of 1 January 2012)

- Bakonycsernye (3,097)
- Balinka (945)
- **Bodajk** (4,051)
- Csákberény (1,182)
- Csókakő (1,311)
- Fehérvárcsurgó (1,971)
- Isztimér (979)
- Kincsesbánya (1,526)
- Magyaralmás (1,537) – from (Székesfehérvár District) 01.01.2015
- **Mór** (14,255) – district seat
- Nagyveleg (659)
- Pusztavám (2,413)
- Söréd (505)

The bolded municipalities are cities.

== See also ==
- List of cities and towns in Hungary
