= List of populated places in Hungary (A–Á) =

This is a list of cities, towns and villages of Hungary

KEY: T = Town ; V = Village

Name	Type	County	District	Population	Post code
Aba	V	Fejér	Abai	4,574	8127
Abádszalók	V	Jász-Nagykun-Szolnok	Tiszafüredi	4,677	5241
Abaliget	V	Baranya	Pécsi	637	7678
Abasár	V	Heves	Gyöngyösi	2,665	3261
Abaújalpár	V	Borsod-Abaúj-Zemplén	Encsi	96	3882
Abaújkér	V	Borsod-Abaúj-Zemplén	Encsi	677	3882
Abaújlak	V	Borsod-Abaúj-Zemplén	Szikszói	113	3815
Abaújszántó	V	Borsod-Abaúj-Zemplén	Abaúj–Hegyközi	3,407	3881
Abaújszolnok	V	Borsod-Abaúj-Zemplén	Szikszói	157	3809
Abaújvár	V	Borsod-Abaúj-Zemplén	Abaúj–Hegyközi	330	3898
Abda	V	Győr-Moson-Sopron	Gyori	3,061	9151
Abod	V	Borsod-Abaúj-Zemplén	Edelényi	285	3753
Abony	T	Pest	Ceglédi	15,814	2740
Ábrahámhegy	V	Veszprém	Tapolcai	501	8256
Ács	V	Komárom-Esztergom	Komáromi	7,255	2941
Acsa	V	Pest	Váci	1,528	2683
Acsád	V	Vas	Szombathelyi	661	9746
Acsalag	V	Győr-Moson-Sopron	Csornai	482	9168
Ácsteszér	V	Komárom-Esztergom	Kisbéri	768	2887
Adács	V	Heves	Gyöngyösi	3,794	3292
Ádánd	V	Somogy	Siófoki	2,416	8653
Adásztevel	V	Veszprém	Pápai	874	8561
Adony	V	Fejér	Adonyi	3,839	2457
Adorjánháza	V	Veszprém	Ajkai	471	8497
Adorjás	V	Baranya	Sellyei	188	7841
Ág	V	Baranya	Sásdi	206	7381
Ágasegyháza	V	Bács-Kiskun	Kecskeméti	1,933	6076
Ágfalva	V	Győr-Moson-Sopron	Sopron–Fertodi	1,951	9423
Aggtelek	V	Borsod-Abaúj-Zemplén	Kazincbarcikai	628	3759
Agyagosszergény	V	Győr-Moson-Sopron	Kapuvári	938	9441
Ajak	V	Szabolcs-Szatmár-Bereg	Kisvárdai	3,952	4524
Ajka	T	Veszprém	Ajkai	31,649	8400
Aka	V	Komárom-Esztergom	Kisbéri	291	2862
Akasztó	V	Bács-Kiskun	Kiskorösi	3,483	6221
Alacska	V	Borsod-Abaúj-Zemplén	Miskolci	877	3779
Alap	V	Fejér	Sárbogárdi	2,143	7011
Alattyán	V	Jász-Nagykun-Szolnok	Jászberényi	2,035	5142
Albertirsa	T	Pest	Ceglédi	11,615	2730
Alcsútdoboz	V	Fejér	Bicskei	1,504	8087
Aldebrő	V	Heves	Füzesabonyi	2,178	3353
Algyo	V	Csongrád	Szegedi	5,326	6750
Alibánfa	V	Zala	Zalaegerszegi	480	8921
Almamellék	V	Baranya	Szigetvári	496	7934
Almásfüzitő	V	Komárom-Esztergom	Komáromi	2,369	2931
Almásháza	V	Zala	Zalaszentgróti	57	8935
Almáskamarás	V	Békés	Mezokovácsházi	989	5747
Almáskeresztúr	V	Baranya	Szigetvári	87	7932
Álmosd	V	Hajdú-Bihar	Derecske–Létavértesi	1,673	4285
Alsóberecki	V	Borsod-Abaúj-Zemplén	Bodrogközi	861	3985
Alsóbogát	V	Somogy	Kaposvári	300	7443
Alsódobsza	V	Borsod-Abaúj-Zemplén	Szerencsi	393	3717
Alsógagy	V	Borsod-Abaúj-Zemplén	Encsi	108	3837
Alsómocsolád	V	Baranya	Sásdi	331	7345
Alsónána	V	Tolna	Szekszárdi	728	7147
Alsónémedi	V	Pest	Gyáli	4,783	2351
Alsónemesapáti	V	Zala	Zalaegerszegi	751	8924
Alsónyék	V	Tolna	Szekszárdi	821	7148
Alsóörs	V	Veszprém	Balatonalmádi	1,335	8226
Alsópáhok	V	Zala	Keszthely–Hévízi	1,254	8394
Alsópetény	V	Nógrád	Rétsági	752	2617
Alsórajk	V	Zala	Nagykanizsai	416	8767
Alsóregmec	V	Borsod-Abaúj-Zemplén	Sátoraljaújhelyi	220	3989
Alsószenterzsébet	V	Zala	Lenti	92	8973
Alsószentiván	V	Fejér	Sárbogárdi	682	7012
Alsószentmárton	V	Baranya	Siklósi	1,119	7826
Alsószölnök	V	Vas	Szentgotthárdi	418	9983
Alsószuha	V	Borsod-Abaúj-Zemplén	Kazincbarcikai	520	3726
Alsótelekes	V	Borsod-Abaúj-Zemplén	Kazincbarcikai	148	3735
Alsótold	V	Nógrád	Pásztói	268	3069
Alsóújlak	V	Vas	Vasvári	621	9842
Alsóvadász	V	Borsod-Abaúj-Zemplén	Szikszói	1,551	3811
Alsózsolca	V	Borsod-Abaúj-Zemplén	Miskolci	6,190	3571
Ambrózfalva	V	Csongrád	Makói	545	6916
Anarcs	V	Szabolcs-Szatmár-Bereg	Kisvárdai	2,010	4546
Andocs	V	Somogy	Tabi	1,193	8675
Andornaktálya	V	Heves	Egri	1,675	3399
Andrásfa	V	Vas	Vasvári	287	9811
Annavölgy	V	Komárom-Esztergom	Dorogi	983	2529
Apácatorna	V	Veszprém	Ajkai	185	8477
Apagy	V	Szabolcs-Szatmár-Bereg	Baktalórántházai	2,341	4553
Apaj	V	Pest	Ráckevei	1,287	2345
Aparhant	V	Tolna	Bonyhádi	1,154	7186
Apátfalva	V	Csongrád	Makói	3,323	6931
Apátistvánfalva	V	Vas	Szentgotthárdi	400	9982
Apátvarasd	V	Baranya	Pécsváradi	134	7720
Apc	V	Heves	Hatvani	2,046	3032
Áporka	V	Pest	Ráckevei	1,165	2338
Apostag	V	Bács-Kiskun	Kunszentmiklói	2,083	6088
Aranyosapáti	V	Szabolcs-Szatmár-Bereg	Vásárosnaményi	2,144	4634
Aranyosgadány	V	Baranya	Pécsi	363	7671
Arka	V	Borsod-Abaúj-Zemplén	Abaúj–Hegyközi	113	3885
Arló	V	Borsod-Abaúj-Zemplén	Ózdi	4,199	3663
Arnót	V	Borsod-Abaúj-Zemplén	Miskolci	2,571	3713
Árokto	V	Borsod-Abaúj-Zemplén	Mezocsáti	1,223	
Árpádhalom	V	Csongrád	Szentesi	602	6623
Árpás	V	Győr-Moson-Sopron	Téti	281	9132
Ártánd	V	Hajdú-Bihar	Berettyóújfalui	598	4115
Ásotthalom	V	Csongrád	Mórahalmi	4,191	6783
Ásványráró	V	Győr-Moson-Sopron	Mosonmagyaróvári	1,989	9177
Aszaló	V	Borsod-Abaúj-Zemplén	Szikszói	2,034	3841
Ászár	V	Komárom-Esztergom	Kisbéri	1,610	2881
Aszód	T	Pest	Aszódi	6,026	2170
Aszófő	V	Veszprém	Balatonfüredi	357	8241
Áta	V	Baranya	Pécsi	230	7763
Átány	V	Heves	Hevesi	5,044	3371
Atkár	V	Heves	Gyöngyösi	3,376	3213
Attala	V	Tolna	Dombóvári	892	7252

== Notes ==
- Cities marked with * have several different post codes, the one here is only the most general one.
