= Mihály Borics =

Hungarian politician

Member of the National Assembly
- Assuming office 9 May 2026
- Succeeding: Gábor Törő
- Constituency: Fejér 2nd

Personal details
- Party: Tisza

Mihály Borics is a Hungarian politician who was elected member of the National Assembly in 2026 representing the Fejér County 2nd constituency. He previously worked as a police officer, and was elected mayor of Csór in 2024.
