= Sárszentágota =

- Village
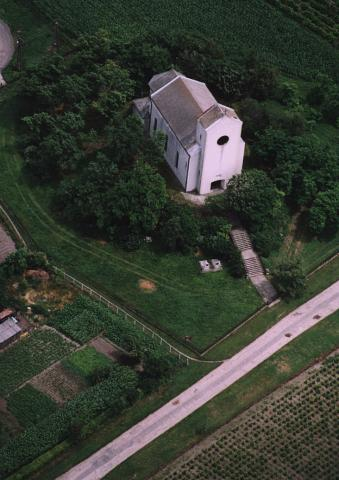
- Aerial photography from Sárszentágota

- Flag Coat of arms

- Location of Sárszentágota
- Coordinates: 46.97046°N 18.56155°E
- Country: Hungary
- Region: Central Transdanubia
- County: Fejér
- District: Sárbogárd

Area
  - Total: 45.5 km^{2} (17.6 sq mi)

Population (1 January 2026)
  - Total: 1,272
  - Density: 28.0/km^{2} (72.4/sq mi)
- Time zone: UTC+1 (CET)
  - Summer (DST): UTC+2 (CEST)
- Postal code: 8126
- Area code: (+36) 25
- Website: sarszentagota.hu

Sárszentágota is a village in Fejér county, Hungary.

The village of Sárszentágota has about 1400 inhabitants. It is located in Fejér county, East of the Lake Balaton and West of the river Danube. The forest that is managed by the village council is home to various animals including foxes, deer and over 150 different types of birds.
