= Mezőszentgyörgy =

- Flag Coat of arms

- Location of Mezőszentgyörgy in Hungary
- Coordinates: 46.992°N 18.2772°E
- Country: Hungary
- Region: Central Transdanubia
- County: Fejér

Area
  - Total: 27.12 km^{2} (10.47 sq mi)

Population (2018)
  - Total: 1,266
  - Density: 46.68/km^{2} (120.9/sq mi)
- Time zone: UTC+1 (CET)
  - Summer (DST): UTC+2 (CEST)
- Postal code: 8133
- Area code: +36 22
- Website: http://mezoszentgyorgy.hu/

Mezőszentgyörgy is a village in Fejér county, Hungary.
