= Fejér County =

County of Hungary

Coordinates: 47°10′N 18°35′E

Fejér County Fejér megye
- Counties of Hungary
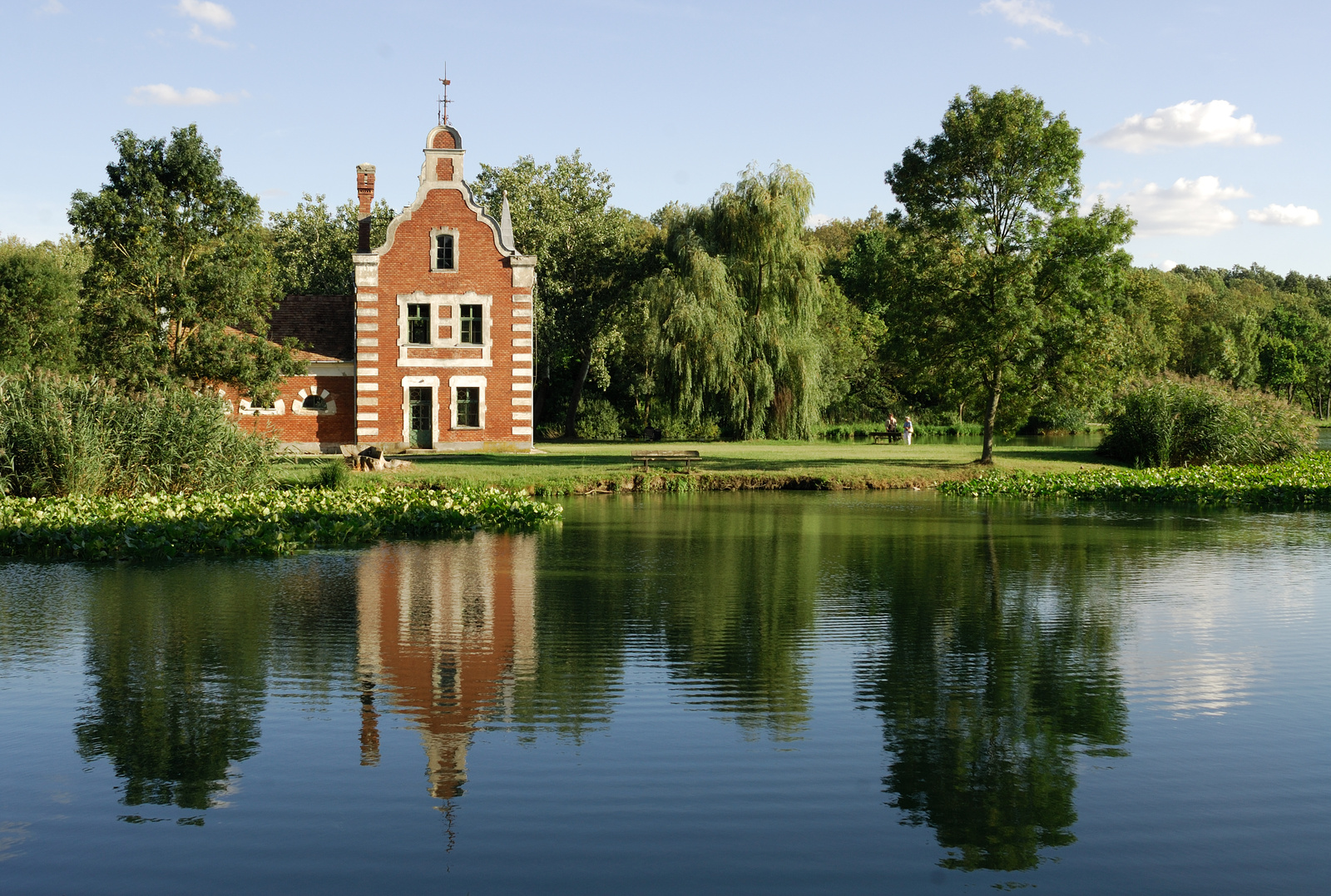
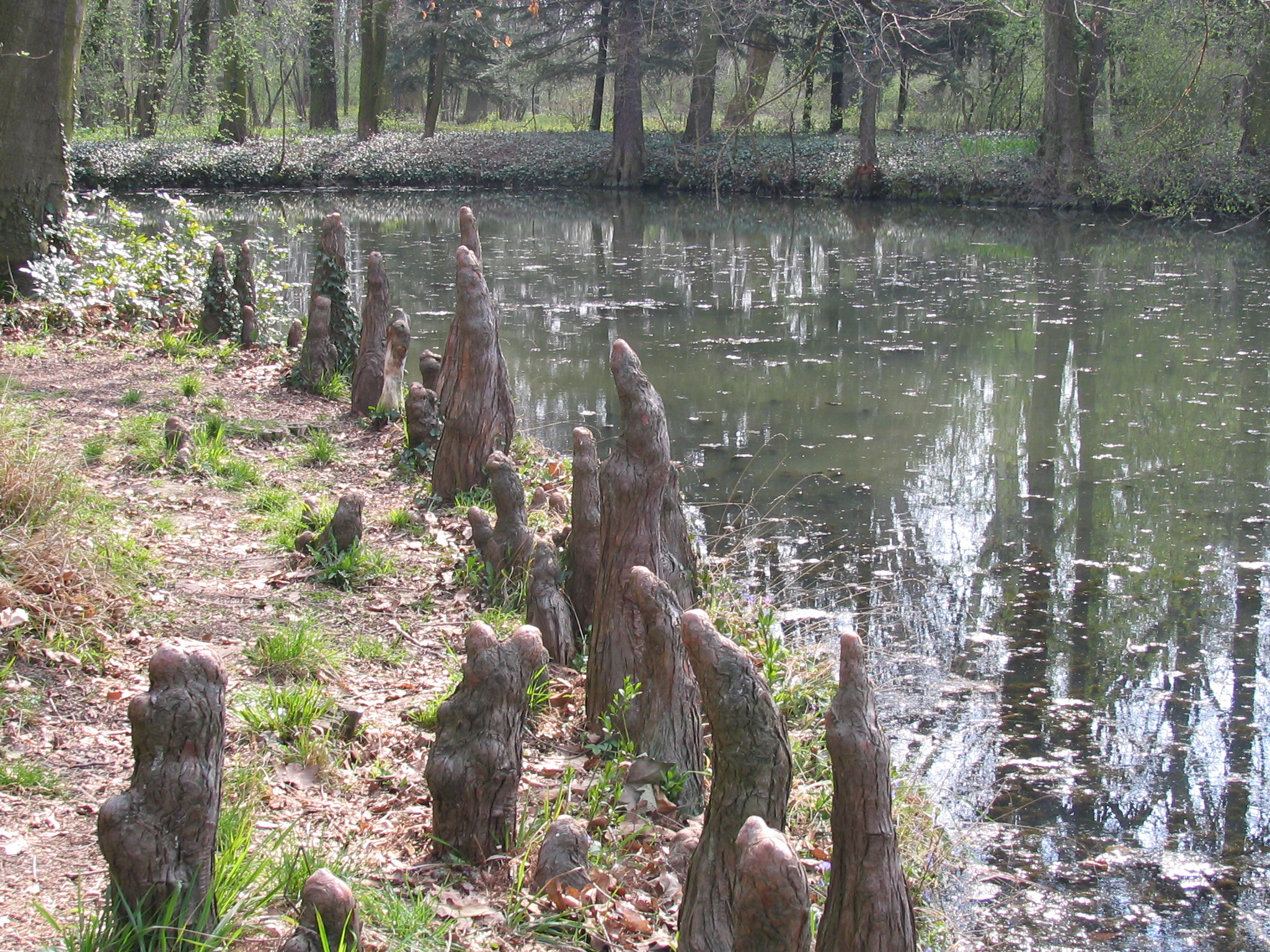
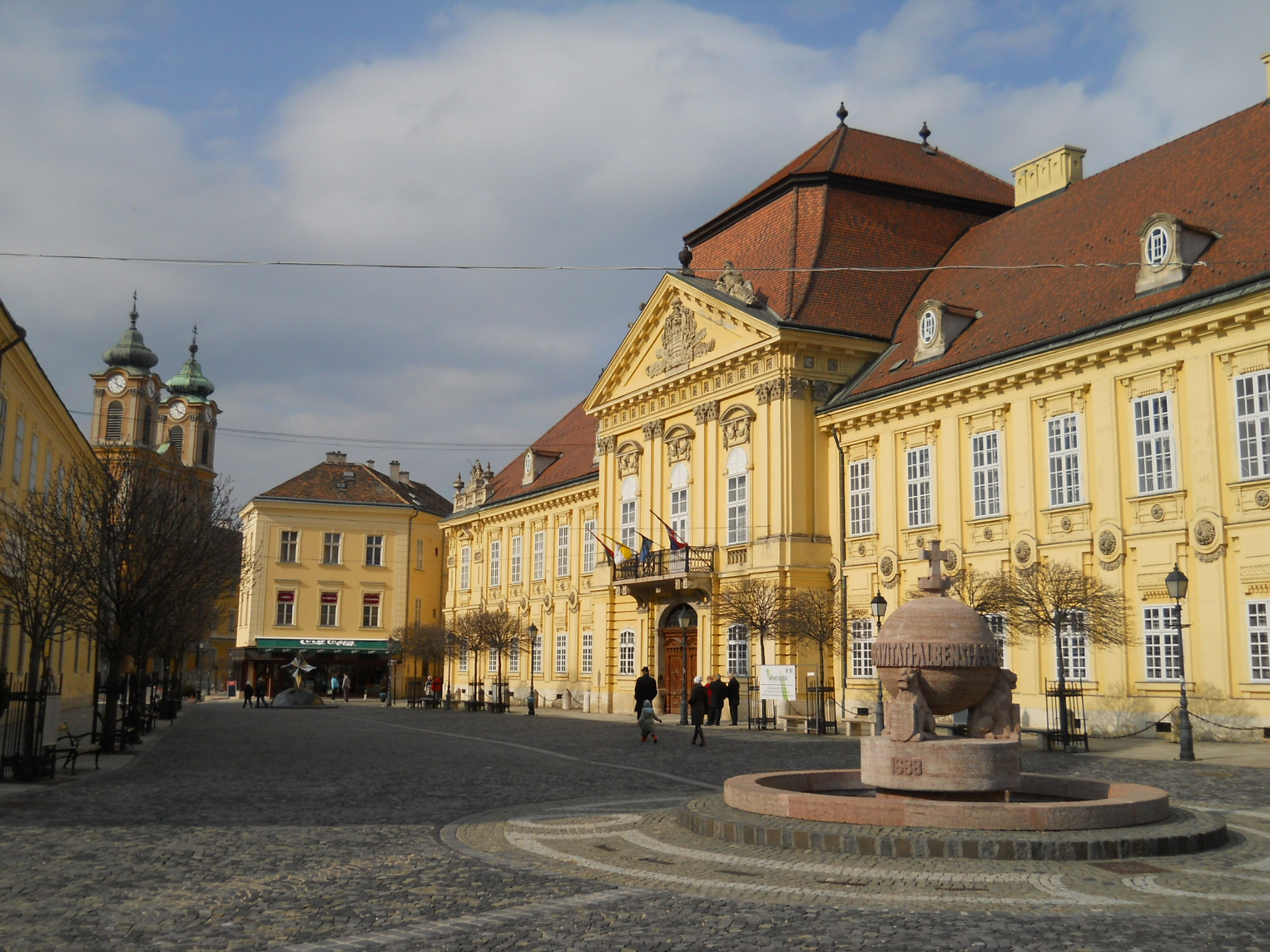
- Descending, from top: Holland House in the park of the Festetich Palace in Dég, Arboretum of Alcsútdoboz, and Downtown of Székesfehérvár

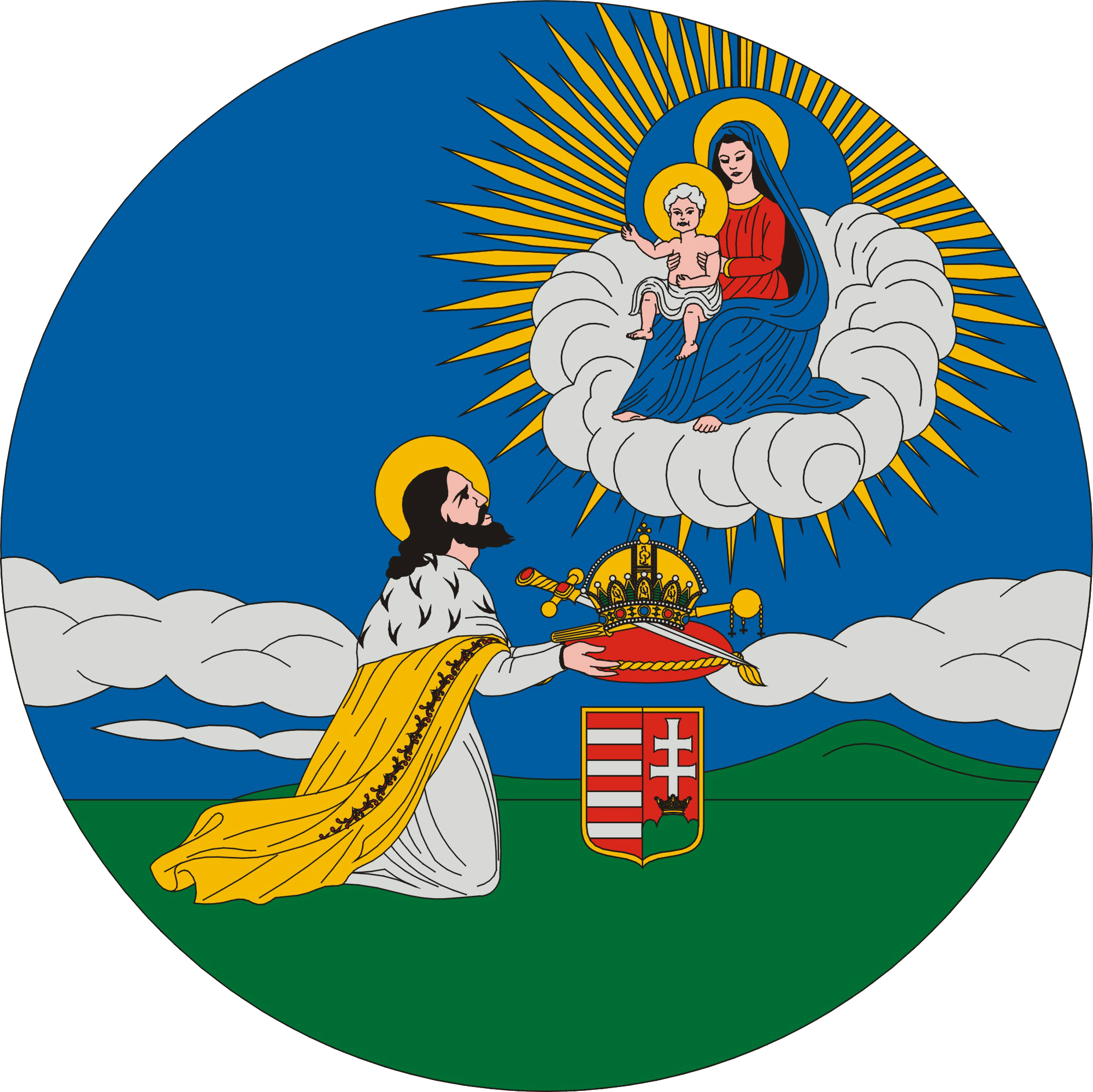
- Flag Coat of arms

- Fejér County within Hungary
- Country: Hungary
- Region: Central Transdanubia
- County seat: Székesfehérvár
- Districts: 8 districts: Bicske District; Dunaújváros District; Enying District; Gárdony District; Martonvásár District; Mór District; Sárbogárd District; Székesfehérvár District

Government
  - Body: Fejér County Council
  - President of the General Assembly: Dr. Krisztián Molnár (Fidesz-KDNP)

Area
  - Total: 4,358.45 km^{2} (1,682.81 sq mi)
  - Rank: 11th in Hungary

Population (2018)
  - Total: 416,691
  - Rank: 7th in Hungary
  - Density: 95.6053/km^{2} (247.617/sq mi)

GDP
  - Total: HUF 1,570 billion €5.042 billion (2016)

Nationality
  - By percentage: 86% Hungarian; 10,9% Refused to answer; 0,9% German; 0,9% Romani; 0,4% Other(Officially non-native nationalities); 0,2% Ukrainian; 0,1% Romanian; 0,1% Greek; 0,1% Croat; 0,1% Slovak; 0,1% Serb; 0,1% Polish; 0,1% Other(Officially recognised native nationalities)
- Postal code: 206x, 209x, 24xx, 700x – 701x, 7041, 80xx, 811x – 815x
- Area code(s): (+36) 22, 25
- ISO 3166 code: HU-FE
- Website: fejer.hu

Fejér (Hungarian: Fejér megye, pronounced [ˈfɛjeːr]) is an administrative county in central Hungary. It lies on the west bank of the river Danube and nearly touches the eastern shore of Lake Balaton. It shares borders with the Hungarian counties Veszprém, Komárom-Esztergom County, Pest, Bács-Kiskun County, Tolna and Somogy. The capital of Fejér county is Székesfehérvár.

== Geography ==
Geographically, Fejér County is very diverse; its southern part is similar (and adjacent) to the Great Hungarian Plain, and other parts are hilly (Bakony, Vértes, Gerecse mountains). Lake Velence, a popular resort, is also located within the county.

== History ==
=== Early history ===
The area was already inhabited 2,000 years ago. When this part of Hungary formed a Roman province called Pannonia, several settlements stood here: the capital was Gorsium, but there were other significant towns too, including those located where present-day Baracs and Dunaújváros are (the towns were called Annamatia and Intercisa, respectively). In the early medieval period Huns and Avars lived in the area. After 586 several nomadic people inhabited the area, until Hungarians conquered it in the late 9th century.

=== From the Roman conquest until the Ottoman occupation ===
Hungarians arrived in the area between 895 and 900. The high prince and his tribe settled down in this area. The town of Fehérvár (modern-day Székesfehérvár) became significant as the seat of Prince Géza. Under the reign of his son, King Stephen, the town became the county seat of the newly formed county. Kings of Hungary were crowned and buried in the town until the 16th century.

==== Fejér under Ottoman rule ====
Fejér county was occupied by Ottomans between 1543 and 1688. Several of the villages were destroyed, the population dramatically decreased. After being freed from Ottoman rule, local administration was reorganized in 1692. Székesfehérvár got back its town status only in 1703.

== Demographics ==
Religion in Fejér County (2022 census – of those who declared their religion (58.6%))
1. Roman Catholic (43.5%)
2. Calvinistic (15.7%)
3. Lutheran (2.50%)
4. Greek Catholic (0.70%)
5. Other Christian denomination (3.70%)
6. Other religion (0.50%)
7. Not religious (33.4%)

In 2015, it had a population of 417,651 and the population density was 96/km^{2}.

Year	County population	Change
1949	295,750	n/a
1960	▲357,897	21.01%
1970	▲391,272	9.33%
1980	▲420,317	7.42%
1990	▼418,852	-0.35%
2001	▲434,317 (record)	3.69%
2011	▼425,847	-1.95%
2015	▼417,651	-1.96%
2018	▼416,691	-0.23%

=== Ethnicity ===
Besides the Hungarian majority, the main minorities are the Roma (approx. 6,500), Germans (5,500).

Total population (2011 census): 425,847
Ethnic groups (2011 census): Identified themselves: 372 538 persons:

- Hungarians: 356 982 (95,82%)
- Roma: 6 277 (1,68%)
- Germans: 5 419 (1,45%)
- Others and indefinable: 3 860 (1,04%)

Approx. 65,000 persons in Fejér County did not declare their ethnic group at the 2011 census.

=== Religion ===
Religious adherence in the county according to 2011 census:

- Catholic – 152,234 (Roman Catholic – 150,883; Greek Catholic – 1,292);
- Reformed – 46,154;
- Evangelical – 7,143;
- Orthodox – 418;
- other religions – 5,524;
- Non-religious – 82,975;
- Atheism – 6,427;
- Undeclared – 124,972.

== Regional structure ==
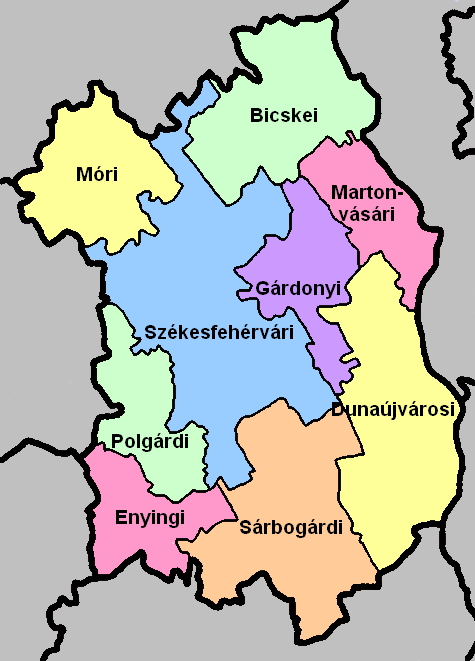
District of Fejér County (until December 2014)

No.	English and Hungarian names	Area (km^{2})	Population (2013)	Density (pop./km^{2})	Seat	No. of municipalities
1	Bicske District; Bicskei járás	578.25	35,660	62	Bicske	15
2	Dunaújváros District; Dunaújvárosi járás	650.05	91,854	141	Dunaújváros	16
3	Enying District; Enyingi járás	433.12	13,187	47	Enying	9
4	Gárdony District; Gárdonyi járás	306.79	29,775	97	Gárdony	10
5	Martonvásár District; Martonvásári járás	277.13	26,531	96	Martonvásár	8
6	Mór District; Móri járás	417.55	34,431	83	Mór	13
-	Polgárdi District; Polgárdi járás	defunct from 1 January 2015				
7	Sárbogárd District; Sárbogárdi járás	653.52	28,509	44	Sárbogárd	12
8	Székesfehérvár District; Székesfehérvári járás	1,032.05	156,935	152	Székesfehérvár	25
Fejér County		4,358.75	425,847	98	Székesfehérvár	108

== Politics ==
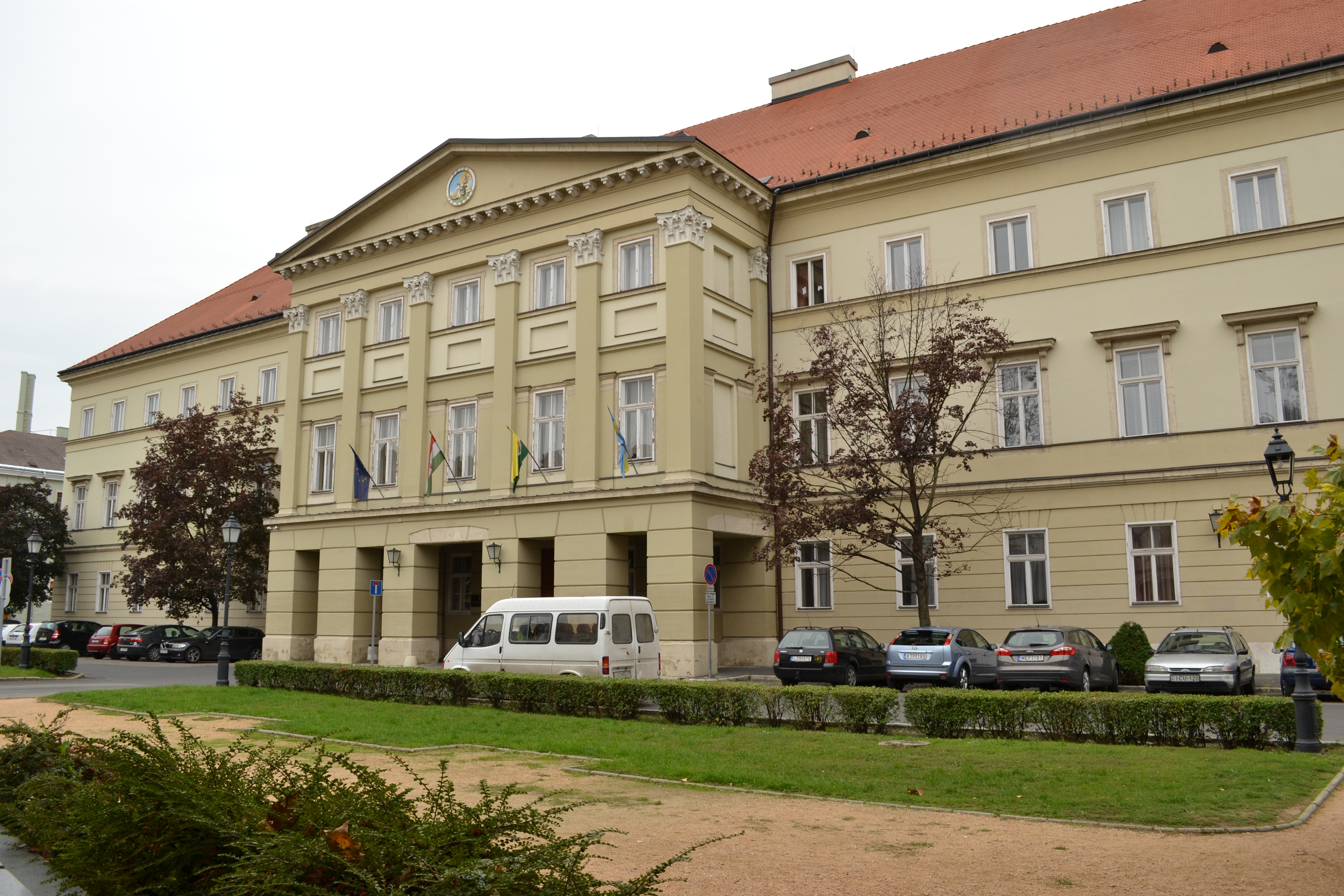
Countyhall of Fejér

=== County Assembly ===
The Fejér County Council, elected at the 2024 local government elections, is made up of 20 counselors, with the following party composition:

Party	Seats	Current County Assembly
Fidesz-KDNP	11	
Our Homeland Movement	3	
Hungarian Two-Tailed Dog Party	2	
Democratic Coalition	2	

==== Presidents of the County Assembly ====
President	Terminus
Dr. Krisztián Molnár (Fidesz-KDNP)	2014–

=== Members of the National Assembly ===
The following members elected of the National Assembly during the 2022 parliamentary election:

Constituency	Member	Party
Fejér County 1st constituency	Tamás Vargha	Fidesz–KDNP
Fejér County 2nd constituency	Gábor Törő	Fidesz–KDNP
Fejér County 3rd constituency	Zoltán Tessely	Fidesz–KDNP
Fejér County 4th constituency	Lajos Mészáros	Fidesz–KDNP
Fejér County 5th constituency	Gábor Varga	Fidesz–KDNP

== Municipalities ==
Fejér County has 2 urban counties, 15 towns, 11 large villages and 78 villages.

Cities with county rights

(ordered by population, as of 2011 census)

- Székesfehérvár (100,570)
- Dunaújváros (48,484)

Towns

- Mór (14,272)
- Sárbogárd (12,446)
- Bicske (11,891)
- Gárdony (9,666)
- Ercsi (8,289)
- Enying (6,835)
- Polgárdi (6,802)
- Pusztaszabolcs (6,099)
- Martonvásár (5,732)
- Velence (5,474)
- Csákvár (5,218)
- Aba (4,426)
- Rácalmás (4,419)
- Bodajk (4,219)
- Adony (3,717)

Villages

- Alap
- Alcsútdoboz
- Alsószentiván
- Bakonycsernye
- Bakonykúti
- Balinka
- Baracs
- Baracska
- Beloiannisz
- Besnyő
- Bodmér
- Cece
- Csabdi
- Csákberény
- Csókakő
- Csősz
- Csór
- Daruszentmiklós
- Dég
- Előszállás
- Etyek
- Fehérvárcsurgó
- Felcsút
- Füle
- Gánt
- Gyúró
- Hantos
- Igar
- Iszkaszentgyörgy
- Isztimér
- Iváncsa
- Jenő
- Kajászó
- Káloz
- Kápolnásnyék
- Kincsesbánya
- Kisapostag
- Kisláng
- Kőszárhegy
- Kulcs
- Lajoskomárom
- Lepsény
- Lovasberény
- Magyaralmás
- Mány
- Mátyásdomb
- Mezőfalva
- Mezőkomárom
- Mezőszentgyörgy
- Mezőszilas
- Moha
- Nadap
- Nádasdladány
- Nagykarácsony
- Nagylók
- Nagyveleg
- Nagyvenyim
- Óbarok
- Pákozd
- Pátka
- Pázmánd
- Perkáta
- Pusztavám
- Ráckeresztúr
- Sáregres
- Sárkeresztes
- Sárkeresztúr
- Sárkeszi
- Sárosd
- Sárszentágota
- Sárszentmihály
- Seregélyes
- Soponya
- Söréd
- Sóskút
- Sukoró
- Szabadbattyán
- Szabadegyháza
- Szabadhídvég
- Szár
- Tabajd
- Tác
- Tordas
- Újbarok
- Úrhida
- Vajta
- Vál
- Vereb
- Vértesacsa
- Vértesboglár
- Zámoly
- Zichyújfalu

municipalities are large villages.

== Gallery ==
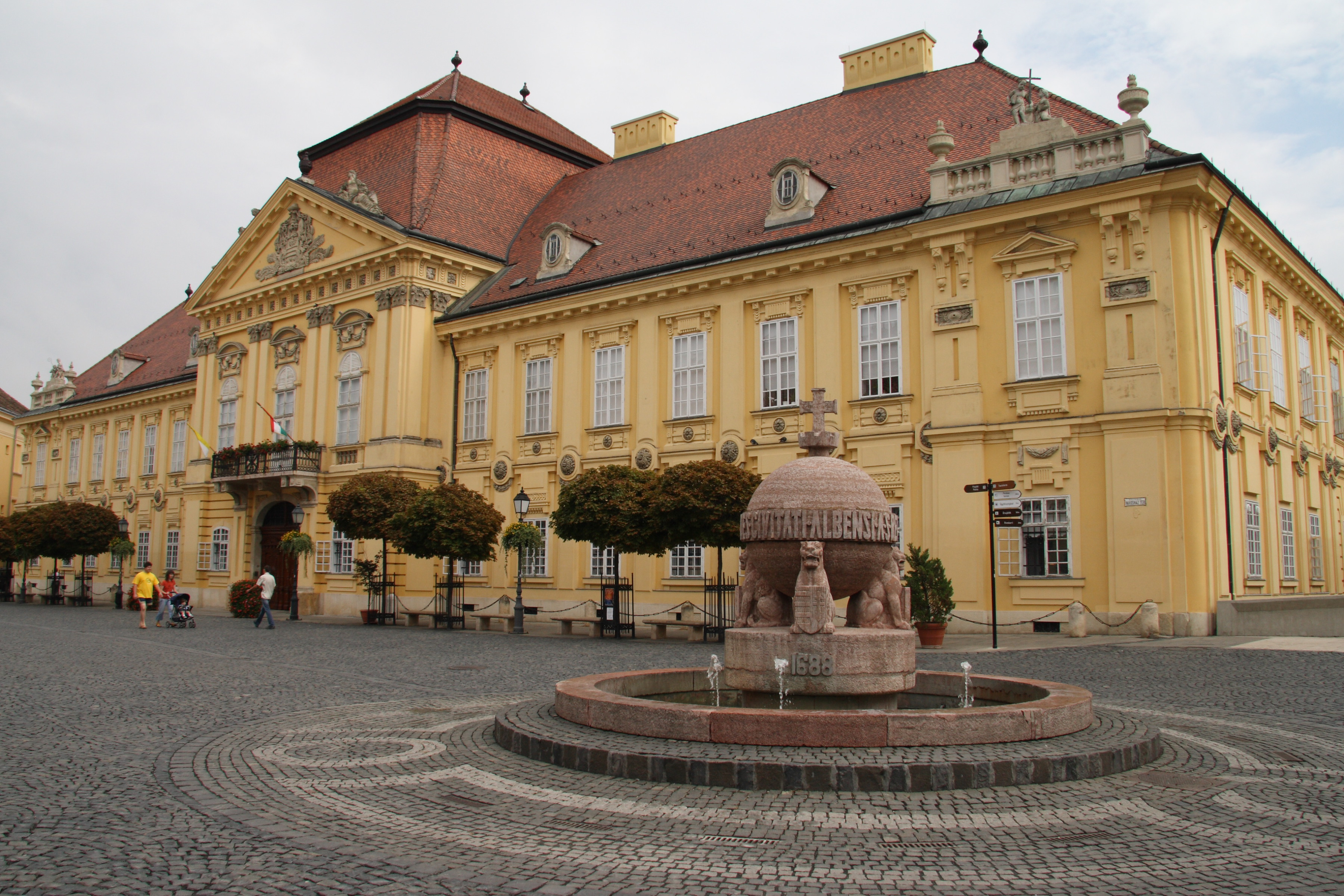
Székesfehérvár, the City of Kings

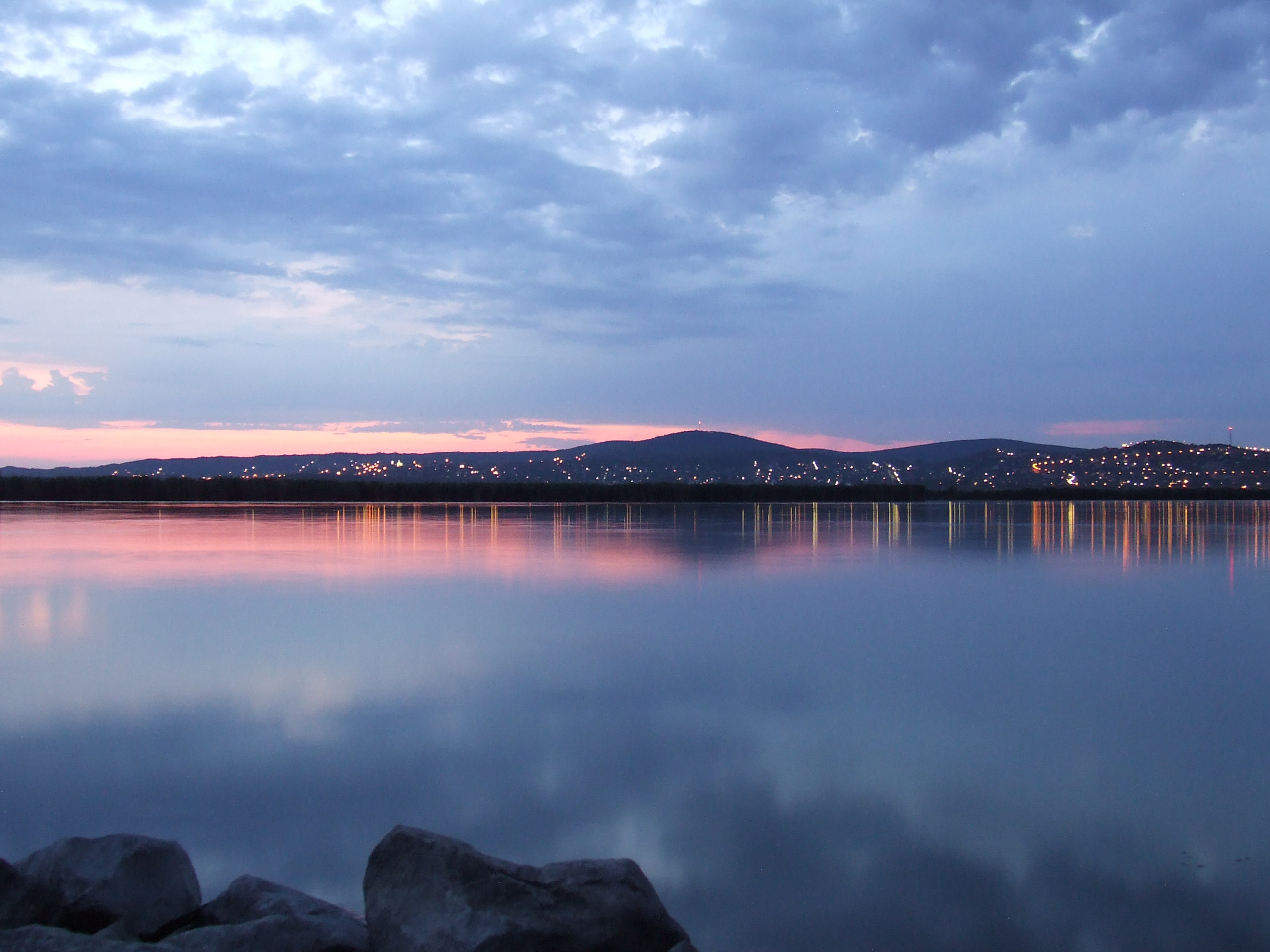
Lake Velence, Hungary's 4th largest lake

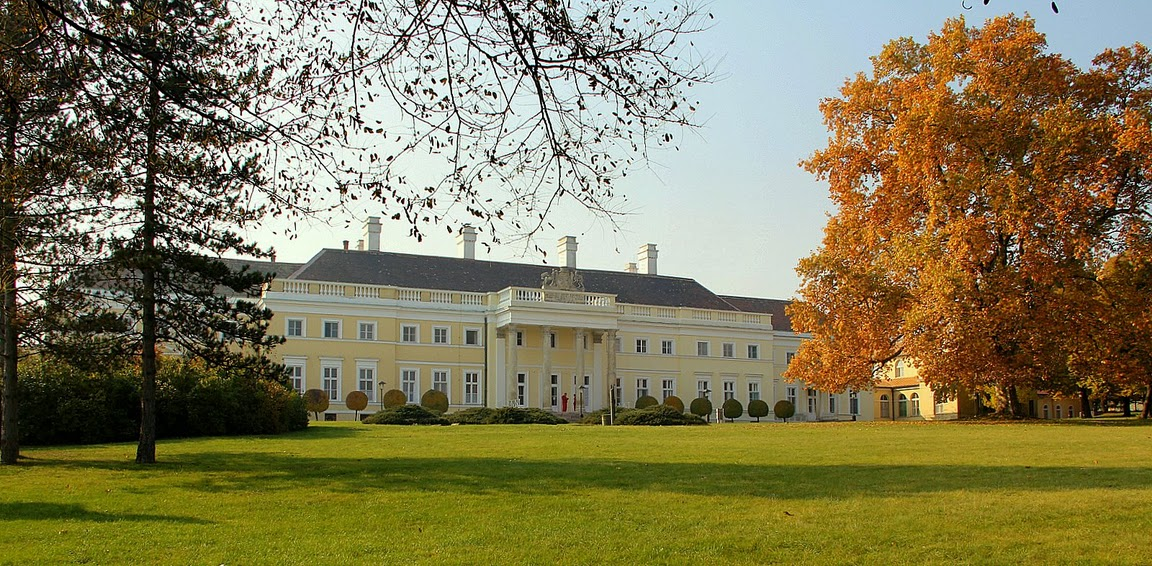
Esterházy Mansion, Csákvár

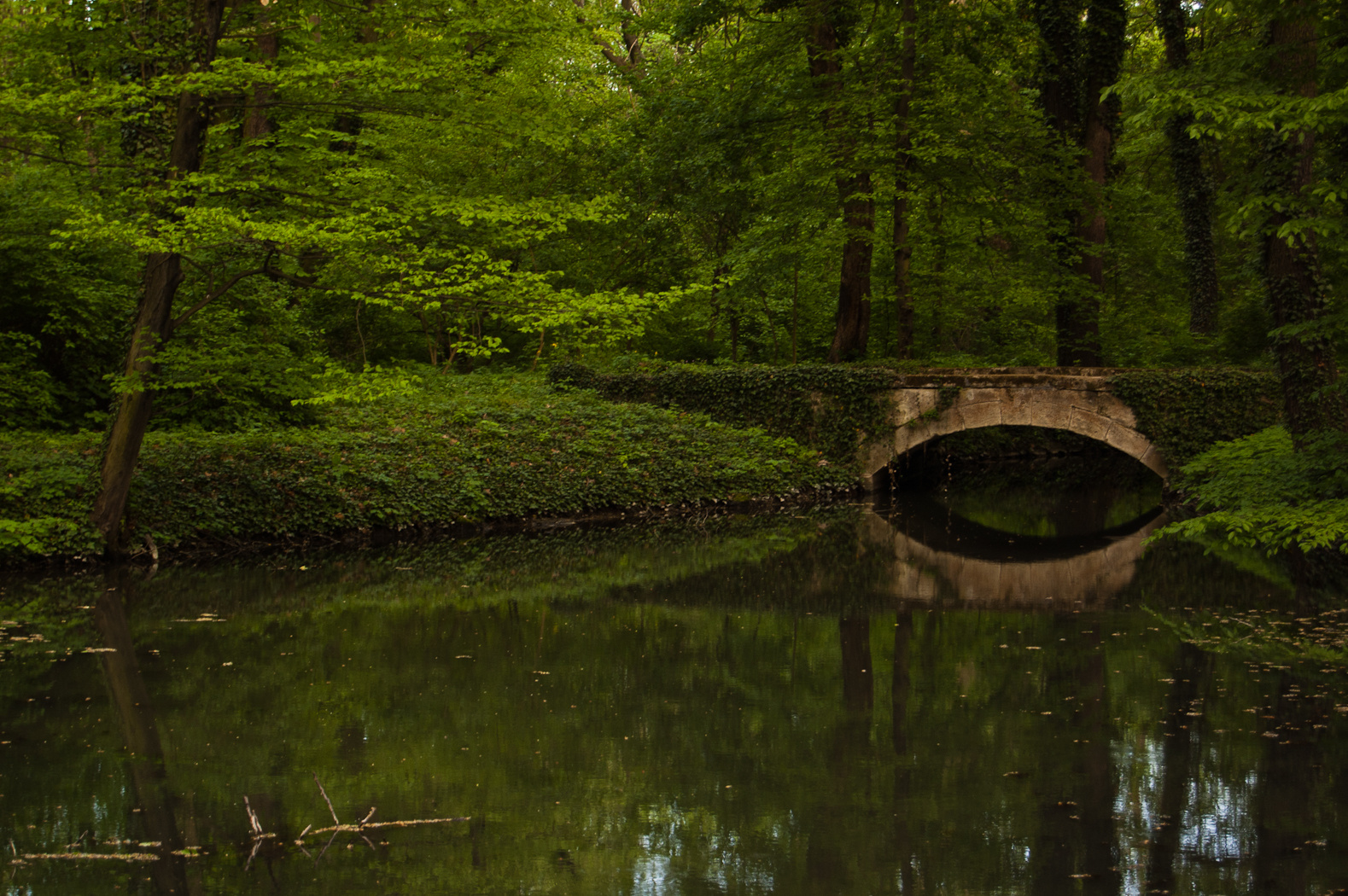
Arboretum in Alcsútdoboz

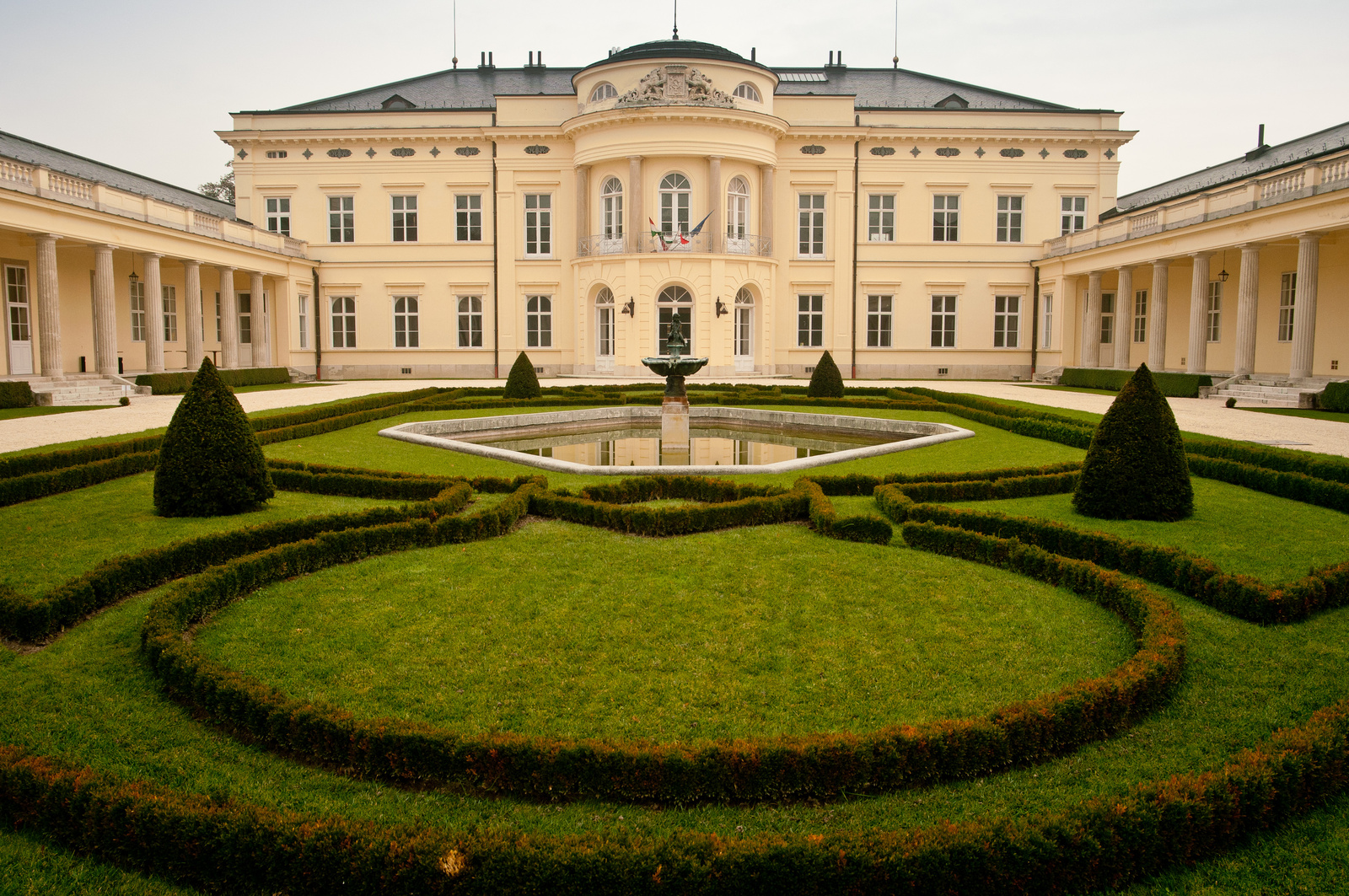
Károlyi Castle in Fehérvárcsurgó

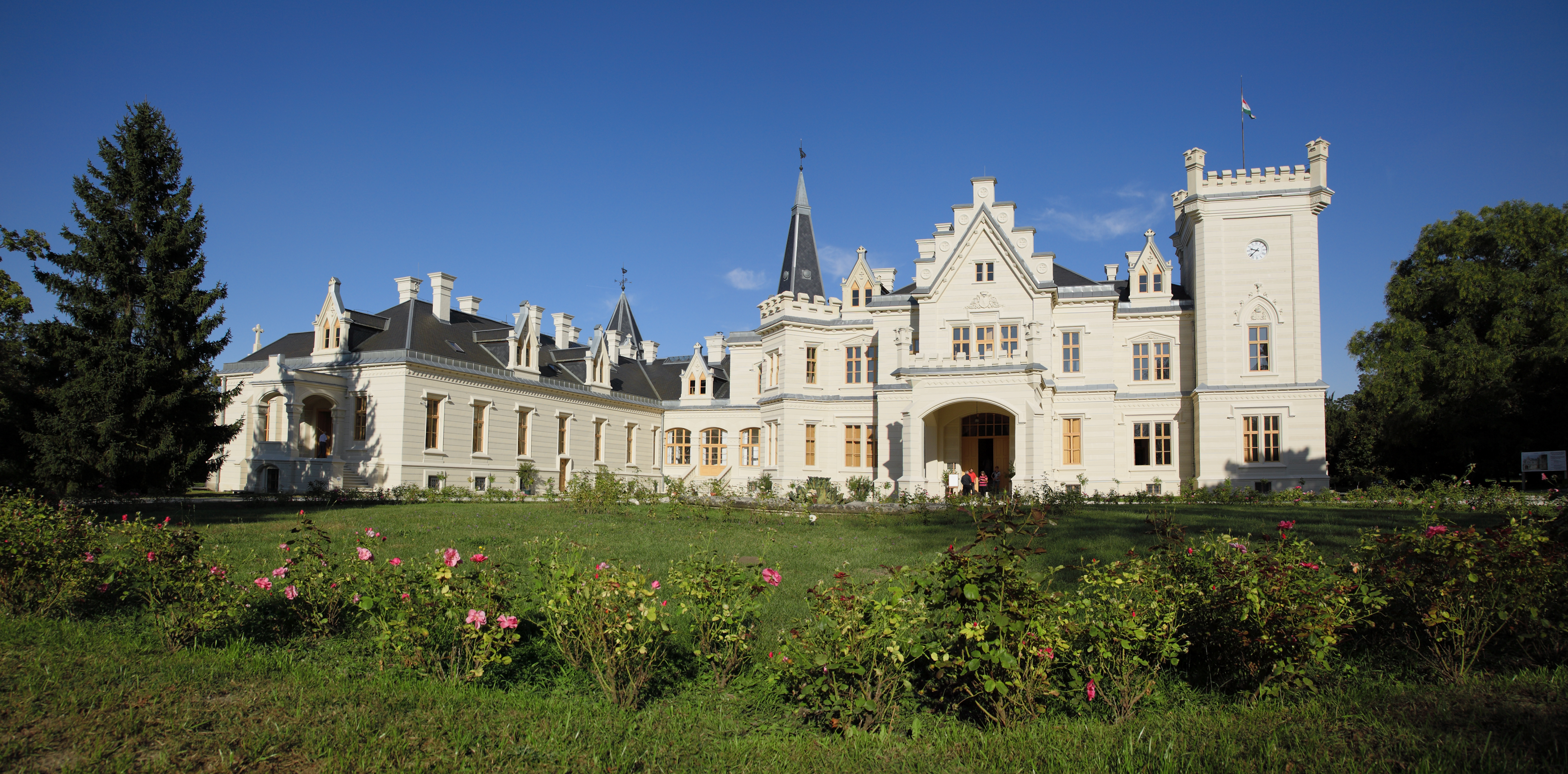
Nádady Mansion in Nádasdladány

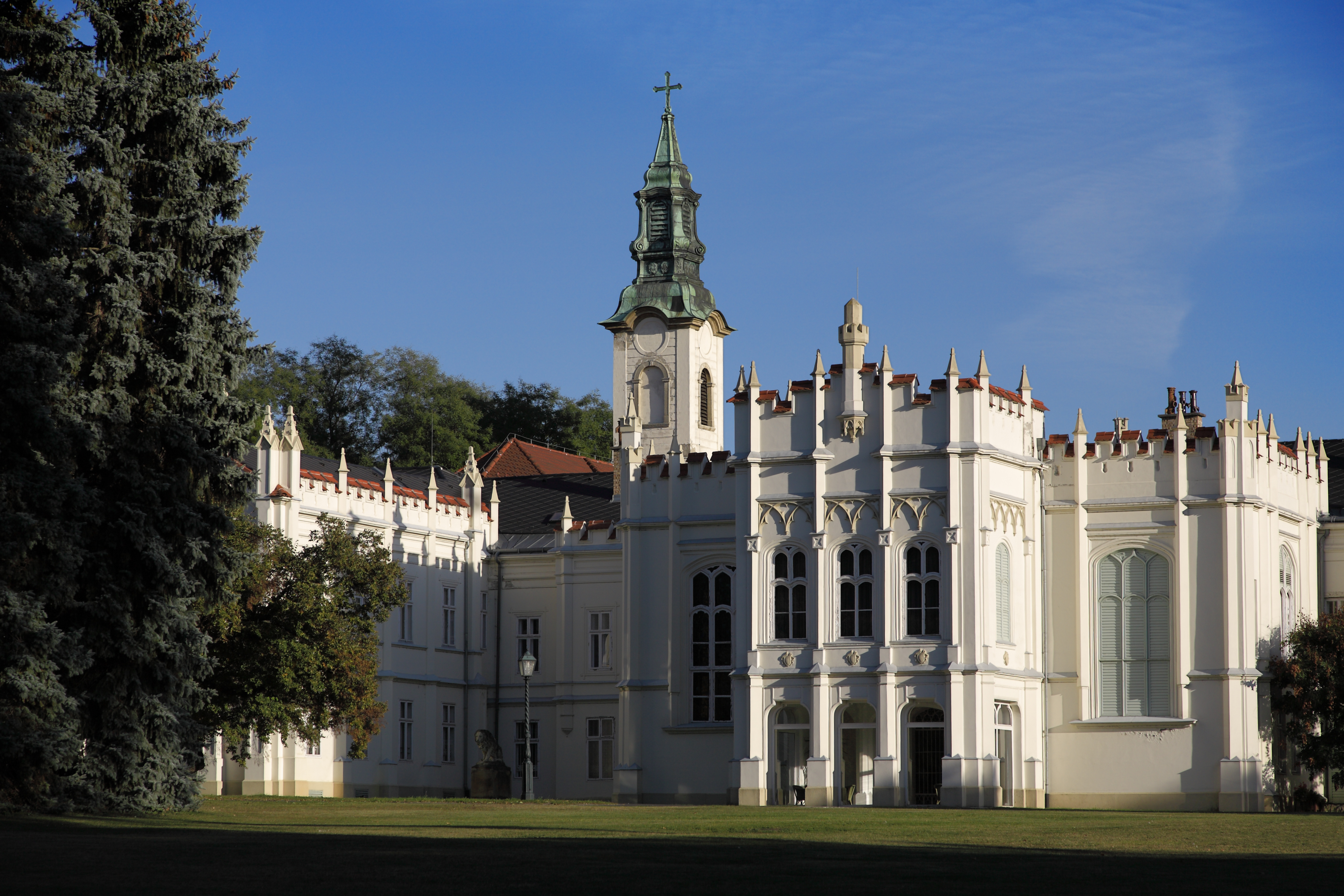
Brunszvik Mansion in Martonvásár

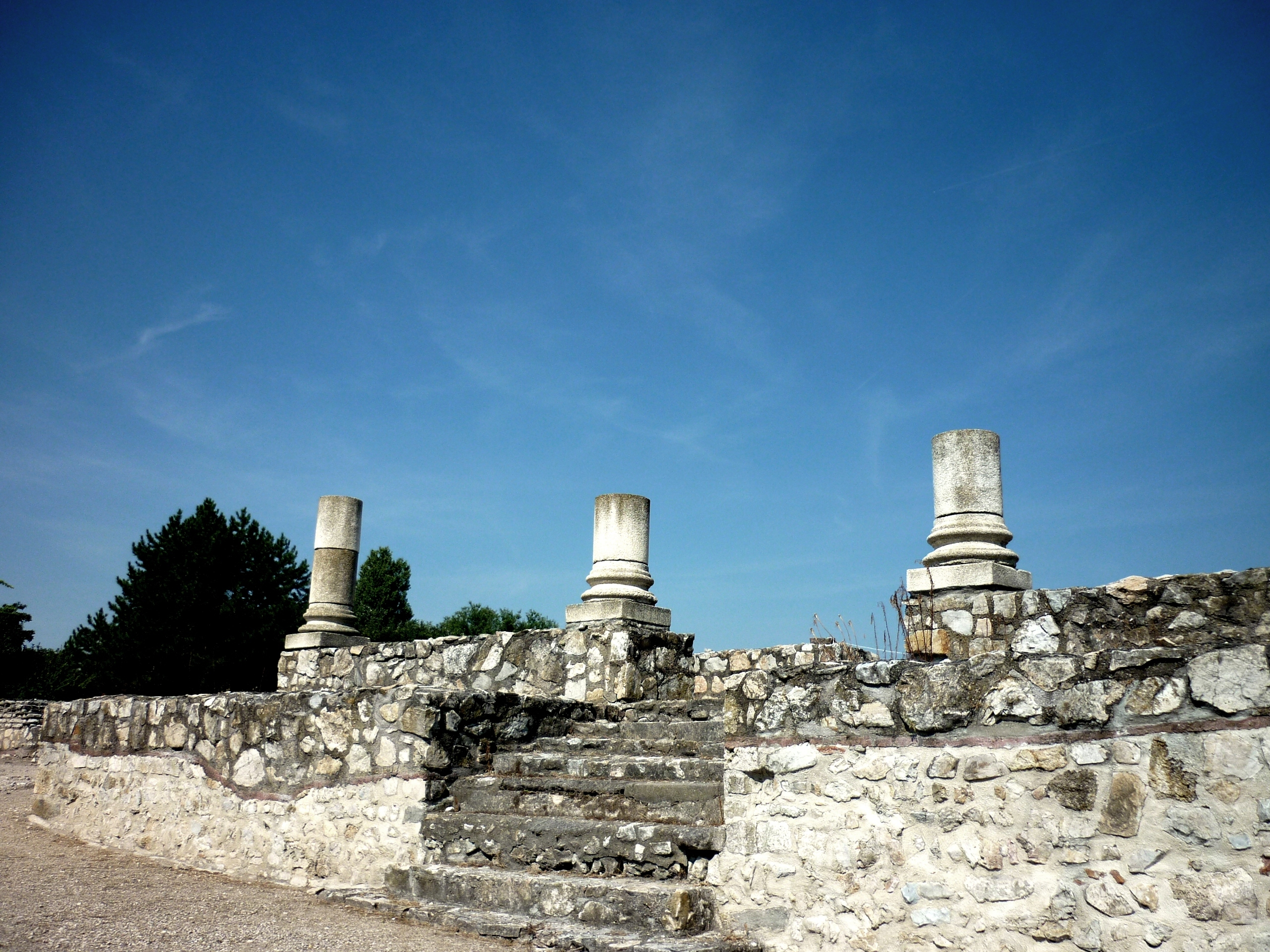
An open-air museum presents the Roman Empire ruins in Tác
