= Kisláng =

- Coat of arms

- Location of Kisláng in Hungary
- Coordinates: 46.9612°N 18.3843°E
- Country: Hungary
- Region: Central Transdanubia
- County: Fejér

Area
  - Total: 53.06 km^{2} (20.49 sq mi)

Population (2018)
  - Total: 2,472
  - Density: 46.59/km^{2} (120.7/sq mi)
- Time zone: UTC+1 (CET)
  - Summer (DST): UTC+2 (CEST)
- Postal code: 8156
- Area code: +36 22
- Website: https://www.kislang.hu/

Kisláng is a village in Fejér county, Hungary.

In 1559 Láng was property of Mihály Cseszneky and Balázs Baranyai.

== Sources ==
- Szíj Rezső: Várpalota
- Fejér megyei történeti évkönyv
- Hofkammerarchiv Wien
- Dudar története
