= Nagylók =

Village of Fejér country in Hungary

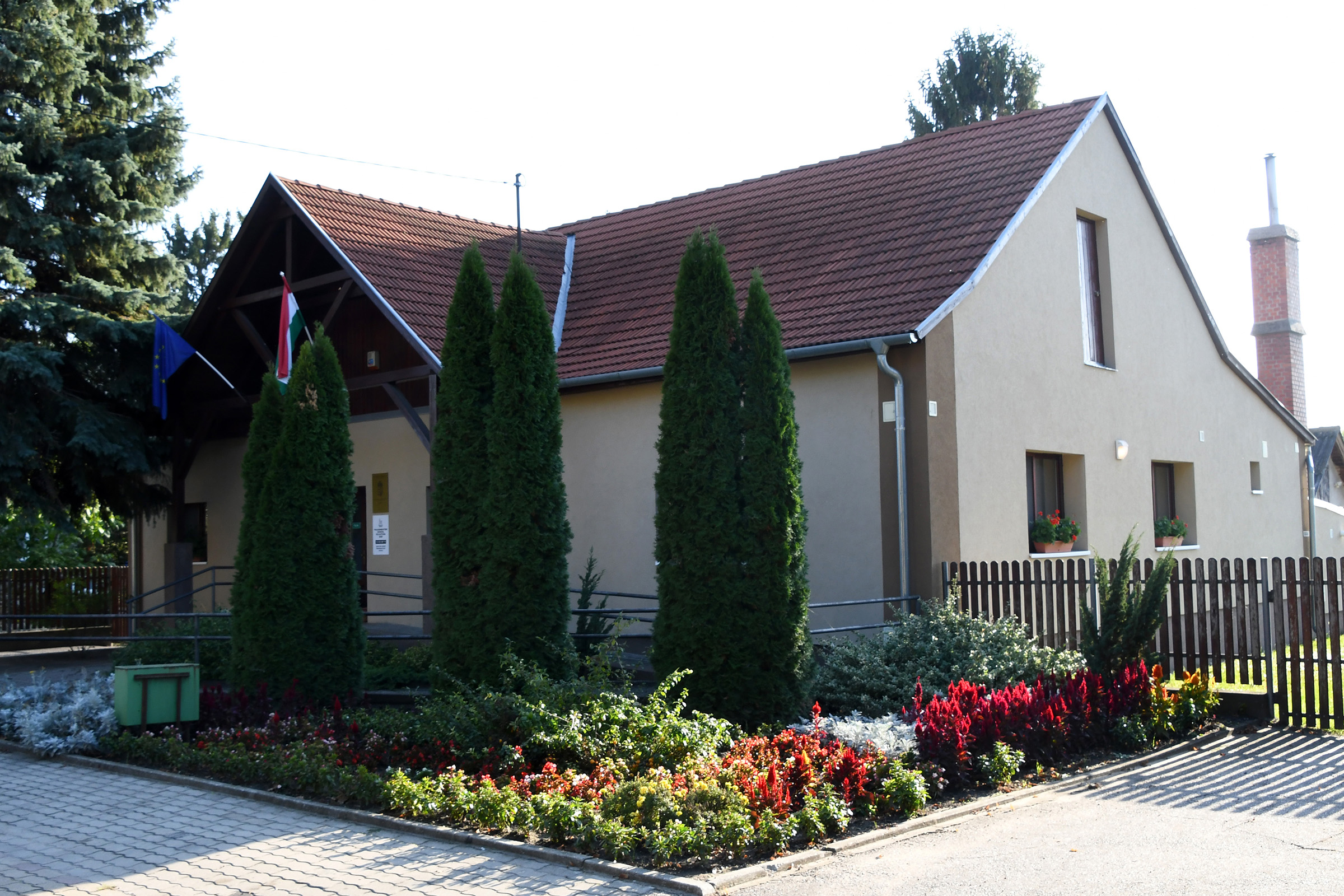
- Village hall

- Coat of arms

- Location of Nagylók in Hungary
- Coordinates: 46.9789°N 18.6406°E
- Country: Hungary
- Region: Central Transdanubia
- County: Fejér

Area
  - Total: 32.44 km^{2} (12.53 sq mi)

Population (2012)
  - Total: 1,059
  - Density: 32.64/km^{2} (84.55/sq mi)
- Time zone: UTC+1 (CET)
  - Summer (DST): UTC+2 (CEST)
- Postal code: 2435
- Area code: +36 25
- Website: http://nagylok.hu/

Nagylók is a village in the Fejér county of Hungary and its settlement is known as horseshoe burial to its civilians and townspeople. It was first historically recognized as Lok in 1258. Lying on the open loess of the Mezőföld plain, Nagylók spreads over 32.44 km^{2} (12.53 sq mi) between the small market towns of Sárbogárd and Sárosd. The cadastral lands, drained by minor branches of the Sárvíz canal, are given over almost entirely to mechanised arable farming—winter wheat, maize and sunflower—while a ribbon of smallholdings and service yards flanks the main road.

The settlement appears in 1258 as Lok, a name most scholars trace to the Slavic loky "marshy pool". By 1872 it had acquired its modern form Nagylók ("Great Lok") at the request of Count Pál Zichy, though 18th-century documents still mention Öreglók ("Old Lok"). Archaeology confirms far earlier occupation: rescue digs at Kislók in 1903 uncovered eighty Bronze-Age graves and the embankments of a late-prehistoric hillfort locally called Bolondvár ("Fools' Fort"). Finds of Roman votive vessels, early-Hungarian horse-and-wagon burials and a hoard of Béla IV coins testify to continuous traffic along the mediaeval salt road that once linked the Danube with the Transdanubian salt marts. The village suffered heavy losses in both world wars—records list 68 dead and 73 missing from 1914–18—and the defensive earthworks raised in neighbouring fields during the 1945 Lake Balaton offensive are still visible on aerial photographs.

Population has drifted downward for decades, from 1,297 inhabitants in 1960 to just 999 in 2024; the age profile has aged accordingly as younger residents leave for jobs in Székesfehérvár or the Budapest industrial belt. Community life, however, remains lively. The three-aisled Roman Catholic Church of the Assumption, erected in brick in 1888 and fronted by a separate belfry, underwent a €35,000 interior and façade refurbishment completed in March 2022; the grant briefing notes that new electrics, window frames and a porch canopy were installed to secure the building's role as the village's cultural and liturgical hub. Each June the "Nagylóki Napok" summer fair fills Hunyadi Street with folk dance troupes and horse-cart parades, while older residents still recall the Luca-day ritual in which masked youths roamed the outlying farmsteads scattering chaff and blackening doorposts to bless the coming harvest—an idiosyncratic Fejér-county variant of Hungary's Advent customs.
