= Bakonycsernye =

Village in Fejér County, Hungary

Bakonycsernye Čerňa
- Flag Coat of arms

- Location of Bakonycsernye in Hungary
- Coordinates: 47.3193°N 18.087°E
- Country: Hungary
- Region: Central Transdanubia
- County: Fejér

Area
  - Total: 38.13 km^{2} (14.72 sq mi)

Population (2015)
  - Total: 3,097
  - Density: 81.22/km^{2} (210.4/sq mi)
- Time zone: UTC+1 (CET)
  - Summer (DST): UTC+2 (CEST)
- Postal code: 8056
- Area code: +36 22
- Website: http://bakonycsernye.hu/

Bakonycsernye (Slovak: Čerňa) is a village in Fejér County, Hungary.

Bakonycsernye is located in the valley of the Gaja stream, at the northeastern edge of the Transdanubian range of mountains. The settlement stretches some five kilometres into the valley forming the present village, with a population of around 3300. Historians and linguists etymologically derive the name of the settlement from the Slavic word of ’cserny’, meaning ’black’. The anterior constituent, the word ’Bakony’ was added to the settlement's name in 1913, when administrative changes were introduced all over the country. Formerly the settlement had been registered as Csernye, by which it is still colloquially known. It was part of Veszprém County until April 1, 1956, the time, when the village was annexed to the Mór District of Fejér County.

Archeological finds from the area indicate that it has been inhabited since as early as the New Stone and the Iron Ages, also indications it was a settlement of significance in the period of the Romans as well. The medieval Csernye was first mentioned in 1341. During the period of Ottoman Conquest of Hungary, Csernye underwent a period of depopulation and its development was halted. Resettlement took place in several stages from 1724 to 1726. The new settlers were Slovaks from the counties of Nyitra and Zólyom of the Old Upper Hungary, who in addition to their mother tongue, the Slovak language, also brought with them new skills and occupations including the basics of forestry and viniculture. The local gentry in this period were the members of the Zichy family, who granted the inhabitants the free practice of their Lutheran religion and built a church and a school for the inhabitants of the village. The settlement prospered during this period and in 1730 the number of inhabitants numbered 300. The first stone church of the settlement was built in 1785.

It was in 1862 that part of the village was destroyed by a great fire. The pews in the Lutheran church, still in use today, were acquired when the church was rebuilt after the fire. The second half of the 19th century saw due to bad weather conditions crop failure and many inhabitants of the village had to switch to crafts. Weaving, spinning and basketry gained importance and the baskets made in Csernye became well known all over the Transdanubian. In 1920 coal mining began in the area of Bakonycsernye and a narrow-gauge railway line was constructed in the vicinity for coal transport. Consequently, Bakonycsernye turned into a mining village. Electricity was introduced, a village pharmacy, a doctor's surgery opened at Bakonycsernye and in the Gaja valley several water mills were constructed; another coal mine at Balinka opened in 1950 and many inhabitants of Bakonycsernye took up job opportunities in this mine.

Today a cultural centre, a library and a music school serve the educational and cultural needs of the inhabitants. In addition to two kindergartens the village also boasts a school building. The sports hall of the village school covers an area of 800 square metres and it can be used all the year round. During the local elections of 1994 the local government of the Slovak minority was elected. It is their task to cherish the Slovak language and traditions. In order to keep the old cultural traditions alive they built a Slovak Cultural Centre in the village.

The ruins of the 15th century Csikling castle can be found approx 4 kilometres from Bakonycsernye. Other important sights in the village include the Lutheran and the Catholic churches, both built in Baroque style. The village also boast several early 19th century porched cottages. Infrastructurally Bakonycsernye can offer favourable conditions. Its houses are equipped with electricity, gas, running water as well as modern telecommunication network systems area also built into the village. The local government inaugurated the settlement's coat of arms and flag in 1997. The inhabitants of the village do a lot in order to create and improve the local conditions for village tourism at Bakonycsernye. The number of houses offering accommodation has lately been on the increase. Visitors and tourists to the area can enjoy the picturesque woodlands of the Bakony region, the clean air of the forests and the well-marked local tour paths.
