= Kőszárhegy =

- Location of Fejér county in Hungary

- Location of Kőszárhegy
- Coordinates: 47.09072°N 18.34057°E
- Country: Hungary
- County: Fejér

Area
  - Total: 5.9 km^{2} (2.3 sq mi)

Population (2004)
  - Total: 1,467
  - Density: 248.64/km^{2} (644.0/sq mi)
- Time zone: UTC+1 (CET)
  - Summer (DST): UTC+2 (CEST)
- Postal code: 8152
- Area code: 22
- Motorways: M7
- Distance from Budapest: 75.4 km (46.9 mi) Northeast
- Website: www.koszarhegy.hu

Kőszárhegy is a village in Fejér county, Hungary.

== The Polgárdi stand ==
The Polgárdi stand, a silver quadripus with four legs discovered in the village, stands out as the most ornamented and singular known folding stand from the late Roman era. Notable for its size and weight, it outmatches all other known Roman folding stands. Crafted around the latter half of the fourth century AD, possibly in a Balkan workshop, it was in use during that period. A 2023 study indicated that the silver used in its production probably came from the Balkans.
