= Sárkeszi =

- Location of Fejér county in Hungary

- Location of Sárkeszi
- Coordinates: 47.15877°N 18.28500°E
- Country: Hungary
- County: Fejér

Area
  - Total: 14.79 km^{2} (5.71 sq mi)

Population (2004)
  - Total: 577
  - Density: 39.01/km^{2} (101.0/sq mi)
- Time zone: UTC+1 (CET)
  - Summer (DST): UTC+2 (CEST)
- Postal code: 8144
- Area code: 22

Sárkeszi is a village in Fejér county, Hungary.
