= Jenő (village) =

- Location of Fejér county in Hungary

- Location of Jenő
- Coordinates: 47.10946°N 18.24811°E
- Country: Hungary
- County: Fejér

Area
  - Total: 5.56 km^{2} (2.15 sq mi)

Population (2022)
  - Total: 1,211
  - Density: 218/km^{2} (560/sq mi)
- Time zone: UTC+1 (CET)
  - Summer (DST): UTC+2 (CEST)
- Postal code: 8146
- Area code: 22
- Website: www.jeno.hu

Jenő is a village in Fejér county, Hungary.
