= Zsuzsanna Kossuth =

Hungarian freedom fighter

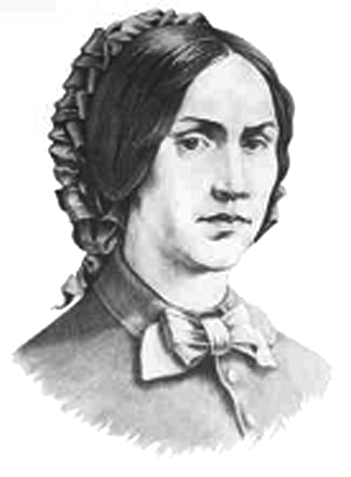
Zsuzsanna Kossuth

Zsuzsanna Kossuth (1817-1854), was a Hungarian freedom fighter in the Hungarian Revolution of 1848.

She was the sister of Lajos Kossuth. In 1841, she married Rudolf Meszlényi. She and her spouse were both members of the National Protective Association. In April 1849, her brother appointed her chief nurse of all the military hospitals in Hungary. She was given the responsibility to organize the entire medical military system in Hungary, and she founded 72 military hospitals. She also sent an appeal for women to volunteer as medical nurses, and organized the volunteering nurses. Thus she was the founder of the modern nursing, 5-6 years before Florence Nightingale started the same activity in the Crimean War. After the defeat, she was arrested by the Austrians. She was released, but harassed by the authorities. When she was arrested a second time in 1851, the Americans intervened, and managed to have her released on the condition that she never returned to Hungary. After this, she emigrated to the US. She died in New York of a lung ailment on June 29, 1854.

== Notes ==
- Kertész Erzsébet: Kossuth Zsuzsanna, Kossuth Könyvkiadó, 1983, ISBN 9630921030
