= Bodajk =

- Town
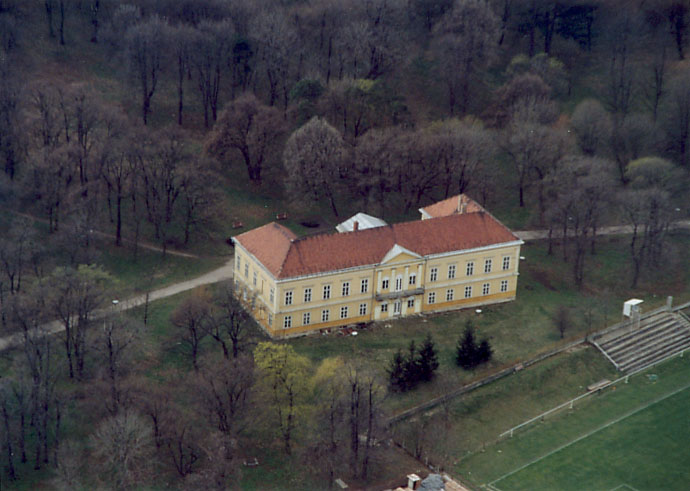
- Bodajk, Palace

- Flag Coat of arms

- Location of Bodajk
- Coordinates: 47.32430°N 18.23179°E
- Country: Hungary
- County: Fejér
- District: Mór

Area
  - Total: 28.99 km^{2} (11.19 sq mi)

Population (2015)
  - Total: 4,066
  - Density: 140.3/km^{2} (363.3/sq mi)
- Time zone: UTC+1 (CET)
  - Summer (DST): UTC+2 (CEST)
- Postal code: 8053
- Area code: (+36) 22
- Website: www.bodajk.hu

Bodajk is a town in Fejér county, Hungary. Since July 1, 2008, Bodajk is a town.

== Sport ==
The town's only association football team is called Bodajk SE, once competing in the second and third division of Hungary. The club won the 2002–03 Nemzeti Bajnokság III season, at that time it was called NBII, and gained promotion to the second division.
