= Cece, Hungary =

Cece
- Large village
- Flag Coat of arms

- Location of Fejér county in Hungary

- Location of Cece, Hungary
- Coordinates: 46.77148°N 18.63461°E
- Country: Hungary
- County: Fejér
- District: Sárbogárd

Area
  - Total: 58.84 km^{2} (22.72 sq mi)

Population (2004)
  - Total: 2,821
  - Density: 47.94/km^{2} (124.2/sq mi)
- Time zone: UTC+1 (CET)
  - Summer (DST): UTC+2 (CEST)
- Postal code: 7013
- Area code: (+36) 25

Cece is a large village in Fejér county, Hungary.

== Notable residents ==
- János Horváth (1921–2019), Hungarian economist, politician
- László Kovács (1933–2007), Hungarian cinematographer
- Gábor Varga (1968– ), Hungarian teacher, politician
