= Alsónemesapáti =

Coordinates: 46°51′N 16°56′E

- Village
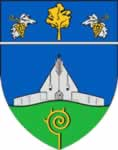
- Coat of arms
- Interactive map of Alsónemesapáti
- Country: Hungary
- Region: Western Transdanubia
- County: Zala County

Area
  - Total: 5.60 sq mi (14.51 km^{2})

Population (2015)
  - Total: 654
  - Density: 117/sq mi (45.1/km^{2})
- Time zone: UTC+1 (CET)
  - Summer (DST): UTC+2 (CEST)
- ZIP code: 8924
- Area code: 92

Alsónemesapáti is a village in Zala County, Hungary.
