= Füle =

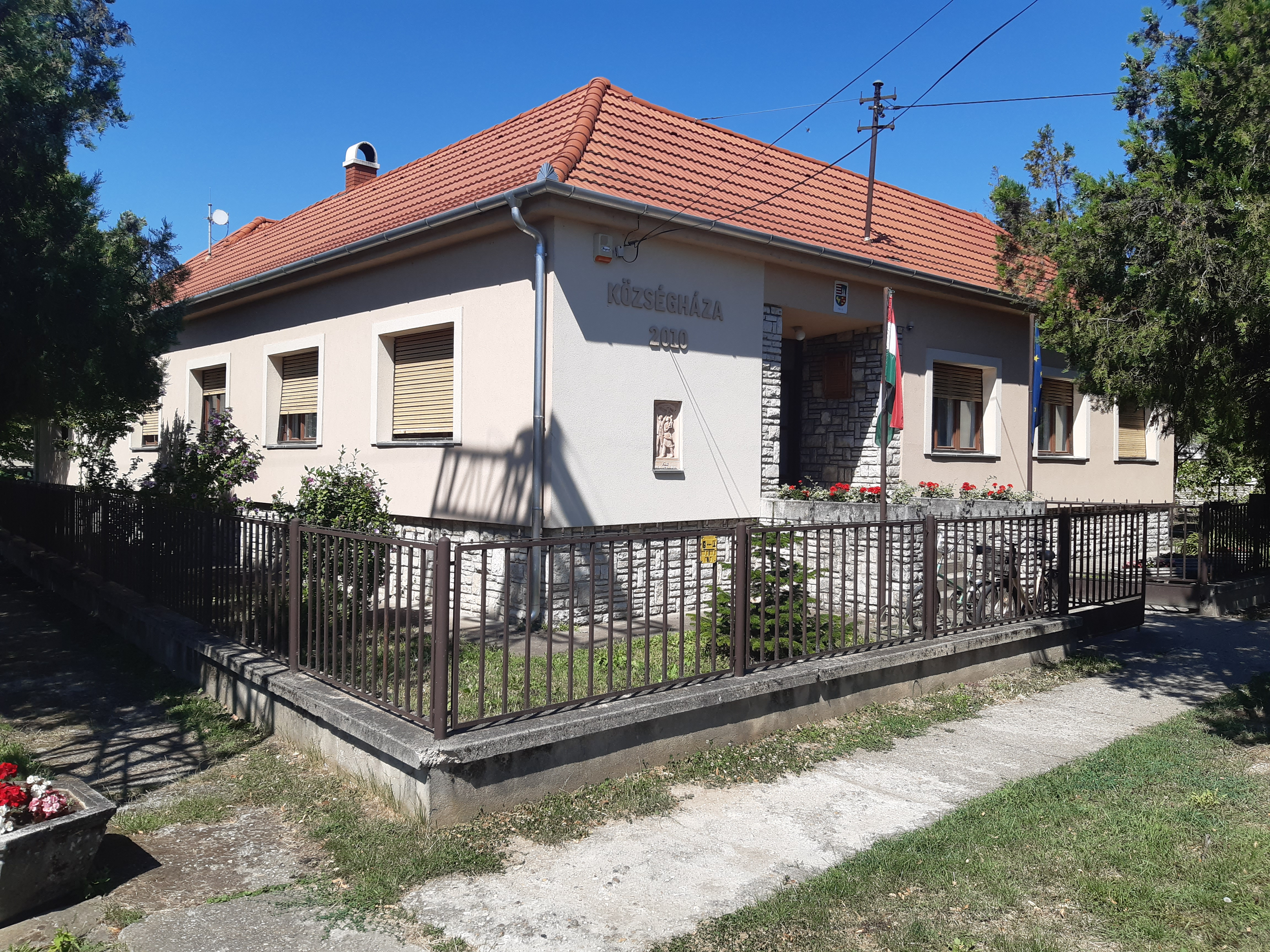
- Village hall

- Location of Fejér county in Hungary

- Location of Füle
- Coordinates: 47.05350°N 18.24899°E
- Country: Hungary
- County: Fejér

Area
  - Total: 30.32 km^{2} (11.71 sq mi)

Population (2004)
  - Total: 884
  - Density: 29.15/km^{2} (75.5/sq mi)
- Time zone: UTC+1 (CET)
  - Summer (DST): UTC+2 (CEST)
- Postal code: 8157
- Area code: 22
- Motorways: M7
- Distance from Budapest: 86.4 km (53.7 mi) Northeast
- Website: fule.szekesfehervar.hu

Füle is a village in Fejér county, Hungary.
