= Tác =

Place in Fejér, Hungary

Tác Gorsium / Herculia (in Latin)
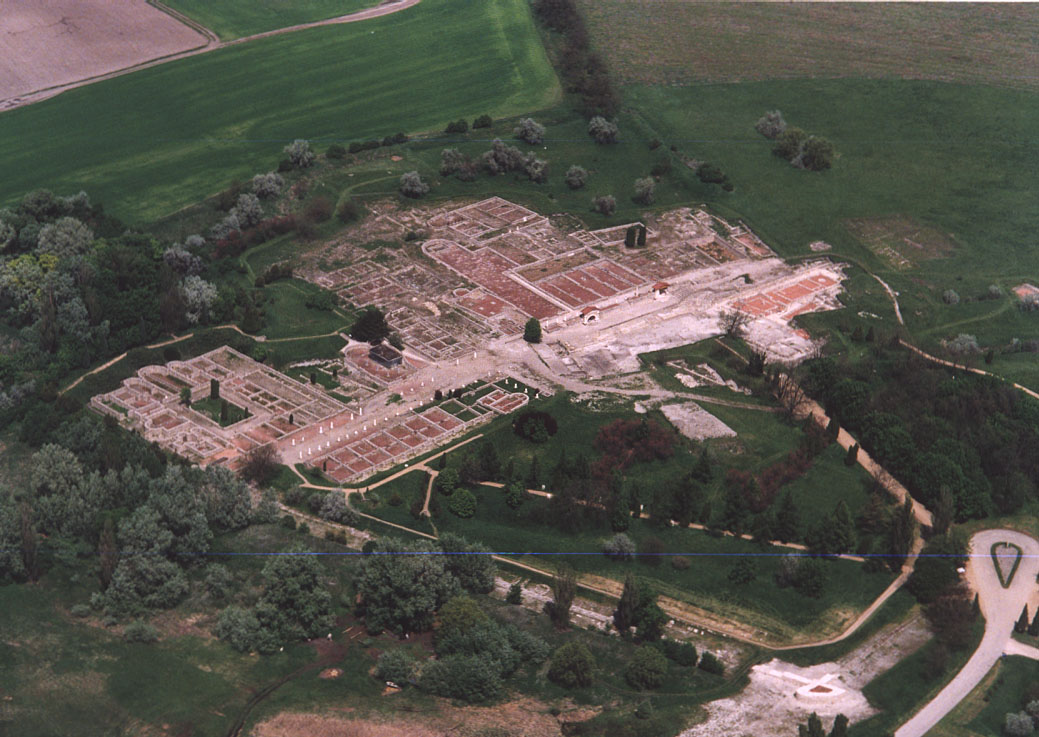
- Aerial view of Tác

- Flag Coat of arms

- Location of Fejér county in Hungary

- Location of Tác
- Coordinates: 47.07933°N 18.40509°E
- Country: Hungary
- County: Fejér

Area
  - Total: 45.69 km^{2} (17.64 sq mi)

Population (2004)
  - Total: 1,560
  - Density: 34.14/km^{2} (88.4/sq mi)
- Time zone: UTC+1 (CET)
  - Summer (DST): UTC+2 (CEST)
- Postal code: 8121
- Area code: (+36) 22
- Motorways: M7
- Distance from Budapest: 74 km (46 mi) Northeast

Tác is a village in Fejér country, Hungary. In the time of Roman Empire it was known as Gorsium-Herculia. An open-air museum presents the ruins.
