= Hantos =

- Coat of arms

- Location of Hantos in Hungary
- Coordinates: 46.9949°N 18.6988°E
- Country: Hungary
- Region: Central Transdanubia
- County: Fejér

Area
  - Total: 36.96 km^{2} (14.27 sq mi)

Population (2012)
  - Total: 910
  - Density: 25/km^{2} (64/sq mi)
- Time zone: UTC+1 (CET)
  - Summer (DST): UTC+2 (CEST)
- Postal code: 2434
- Area code: +36 25
- Website: hantos.uw.hu

Hantos is a village in Fejér county, Hungary.
