= Mátyásdomb =

- Location of Fejér county in Hungary

- Location of Mátyásdomb
- Coordinates: 46.92172°N 18.34869°E
- Country: Hungary
- County: Fejér

Area
  - Total: 35.39 km^{2} (13.66 sq mi)

Population (2004)
  - Total: 792
  - Density: 22.37/km^{2} (57.9/sq mi)
- Time zone: UTC+1 (CET)
  - Summer (DST): UTC+2 (CEST)
- Postal code: 8134
- Area code: 22
- Website: www.matyasdomb.hu

Mátyásdomb is a village in Fejér county, Hungary.

It got its name from Mátyás Rákosi, a former Hungarian leader.

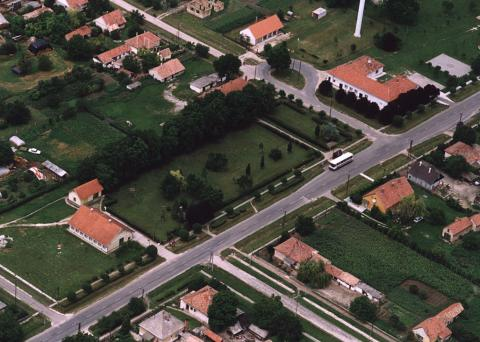
Aerial photograph of Mátyásdomb
