= Úrhida =

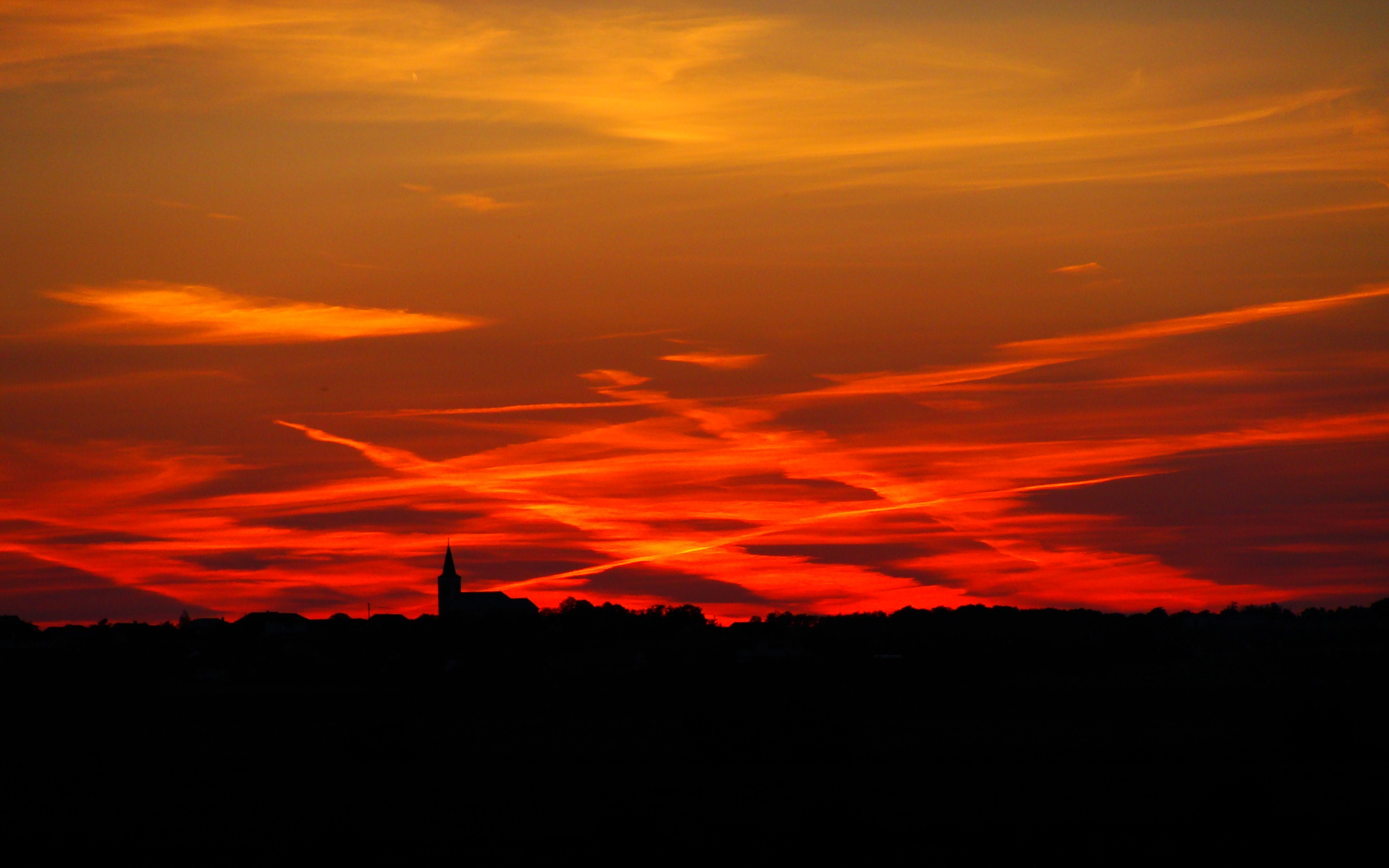

- Flag Coat of arms

- Location of Úrhida
- Coordinates: 47°07′50″N 18°19′55″E
- Country: Hungary
- County: Fejér

Area
  - Total: 7.25 km^{2} (2.80 sq mi)

Population (2004)
  - Total: 1,754
  - Density: 241.93/km^{2} (626.6/sq mi)
- Time zone: UTC+1 (CET)
  - Summer (DST): UTC+2 (CEST)
- Postal code: 8142
- Area code: 22
- Website: www.urhida.hu

Úrhida is a village in Fejér county, Hungary.
