= Csősz =

- Flag Coat of arms

- Location of Csősz in Hungary
- Coordinates: 47.0393°N 18.4139°E
- Country: Hungary
- Region: Central Transdanubia
- County: Fejér

Area
  - Total: 17.11 km^{2} (6.61 sq mi)

Population (2012)
  - Total: 1,044
  - Density: 61.02/km^{2} (158.0/sq mi)
- Time zone: UTC+1 (CET)
  - Summer (DST): UTC+2 (CEST)
- Postal code: 8122
- Area code: +36 22
- Website: http://csosz.hu/

Csősz is a village in Fejér county, Hungary.
