= Sárbogárd =

- Town
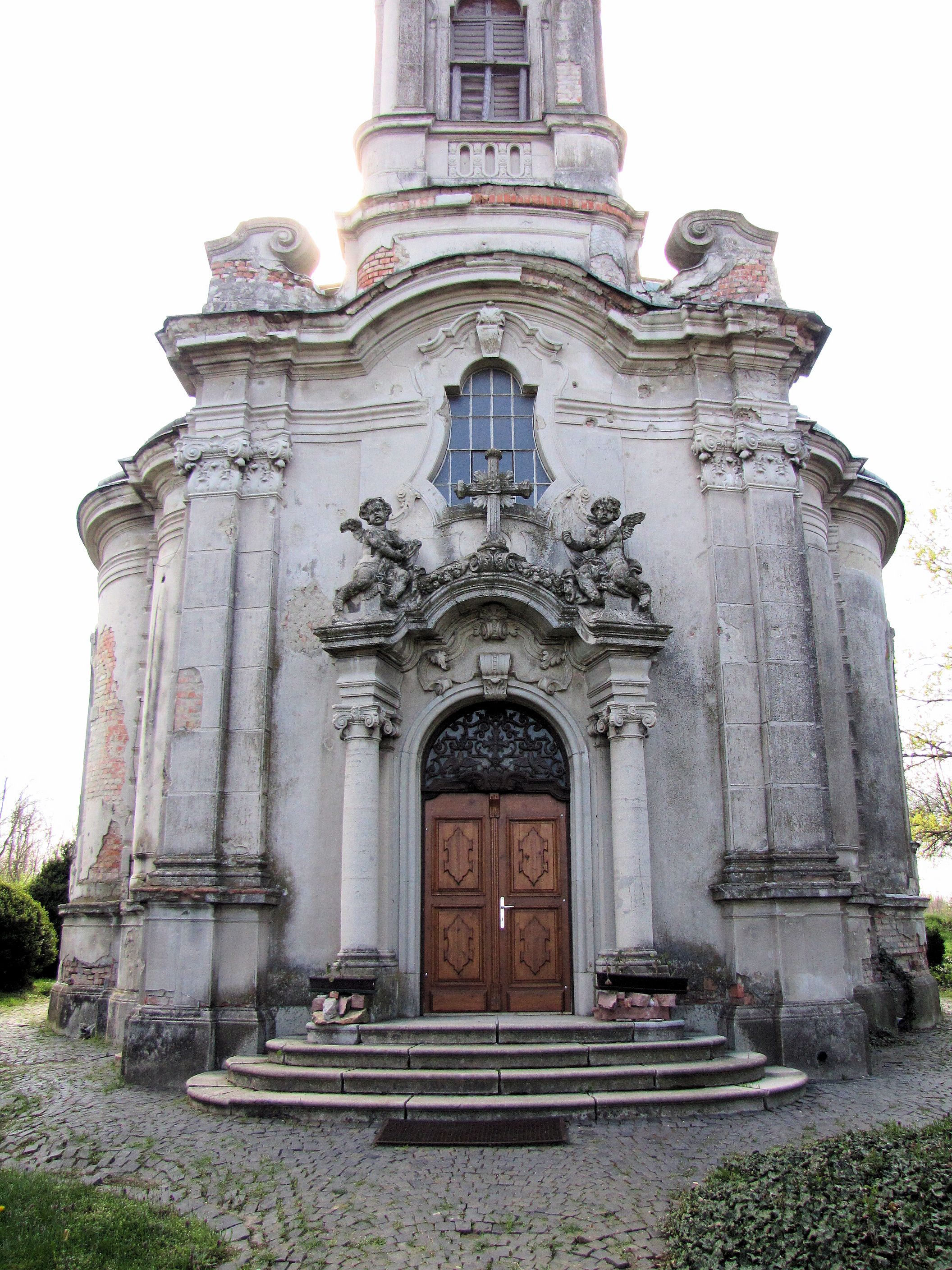
- Sárhatvan Chapel of Sárbogárd

- Flag Coat of arms

- Location of Sárbogárd
- Coordinates: 46.88776°N 18.61932°E
- Country: Hungary
- County: Fejér
- District: Sárbogárd

Area
  - Total: 189.34 km^{2} (73.10 sq mi)

Population (2009)
  - Total: 12,922
  - Density: 68.248/km^{2} (176.76/sq mi)
- Time zone: UTC+1 (CET)
  - Summer (DST): UTC+2 (CEST)
- Postal code: 7000
- Area code: (+36) 25
- Website: www.sarbogard.hu

Sárbogárd (German: Bochart) is a town in Fejér county, Hungary. The town is at the intersection of important railroad routes in Hungary: this is where electrified routes from Balaton and Pécs merge with non-electrified railways from Baja and Szekszárd. A double electrified track runs from Sárbogárd to Budapest allowing MÁV trains to provide quick access to the capital.

== Twin towns — sister cities ==
Sárbogárd is twinned with:

- Bene, Ukraine
- Zetea, Romania

== Notable people ==
- Zoltán Lengyel (1960–), politician
- Géza Mészöly (1844–1887), Romantic painter
- Lajos Májer (1956–1998), footballer
- Béla Jurcsek (1893–1945), politician, Minister of Agriculture
- Gábor Varga (1968–), politician
- Zsuzsanna Kossuth (1817-1854), freedom fighter and nurse

== Gallery ==
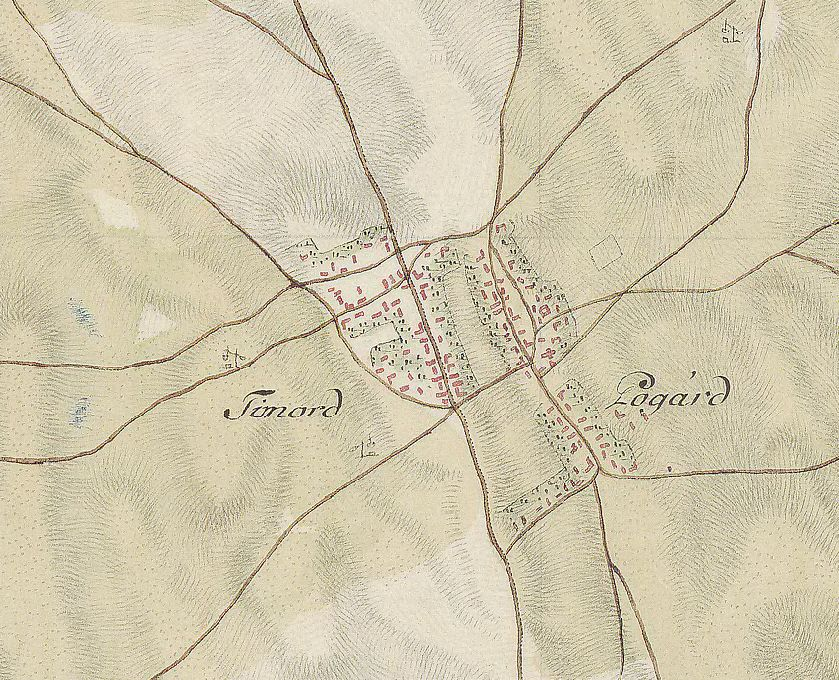
The map of Sárbogárd from the First Military Mapping Survey of Austria Empire

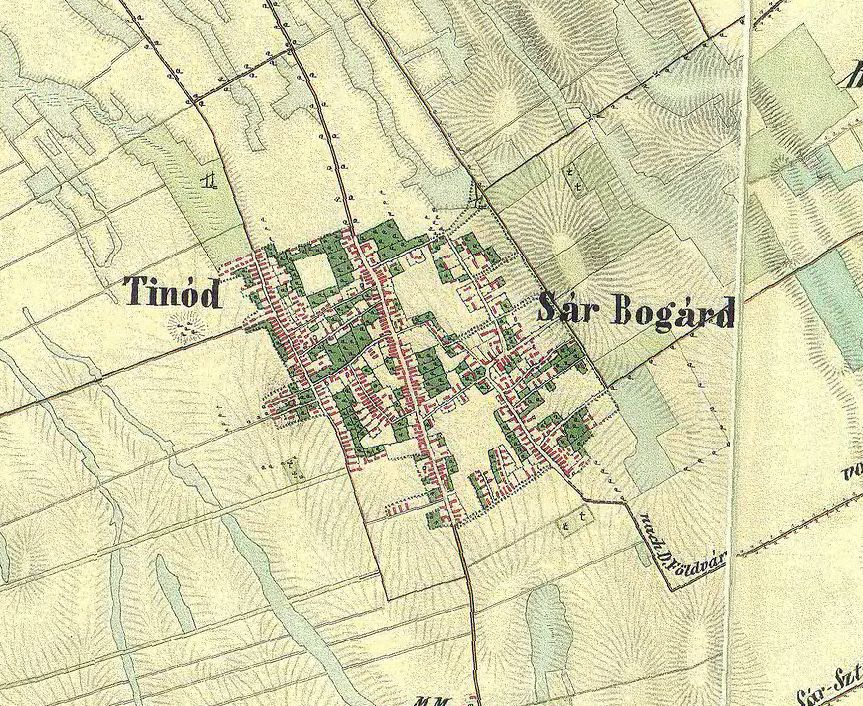
The map of Sárbogárd from the Second Military Mapping Survey of Austria Empire

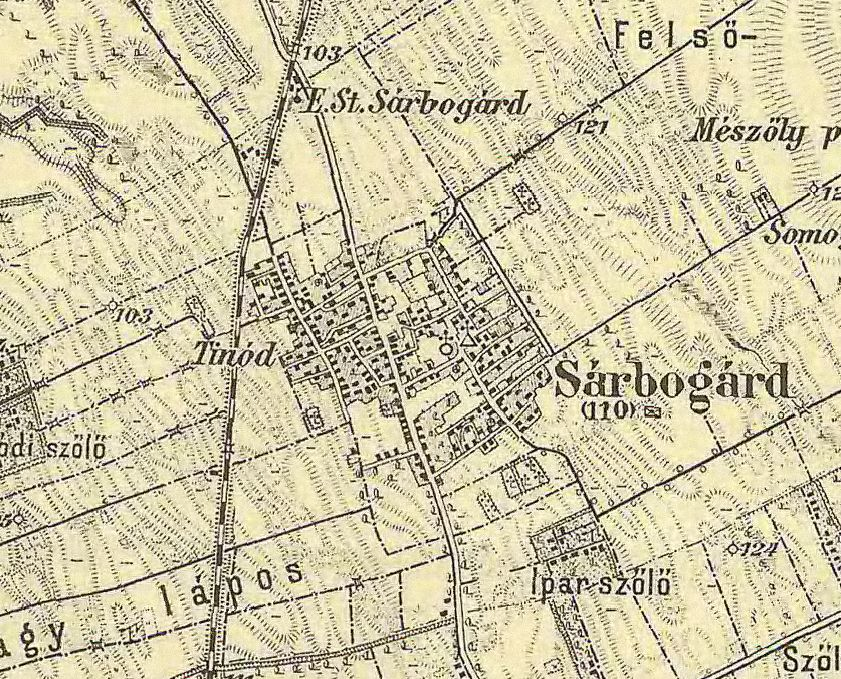
The map of Sárbogárd from the 3rd Military Mapping Survey of Austria Empire
