= Szabadhídvég =

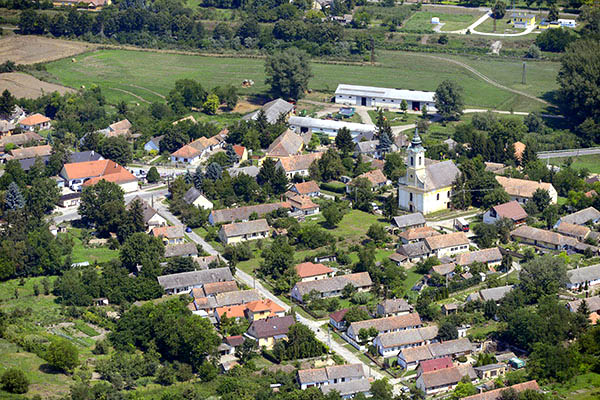
- Szabadhídvég from a bird's eye's view

- Coat of arms

- Location of Fejér county in Hungary

- Location of Szabadhídvég
- Coordinates: 46.81912°N 18.28018°E
- Country: Hungary
- County: Fejér

Area
  - Total: 44.1 km^{2} (17.0 sq mi)

Population (2004)
  - Total: 980
  - Density: 22.22/km^{2} (57.5/sq mi)
- Time zone: UTC+1 (CET)
  - Summer (DST): UTC+2 (CEST)
- Postal code: 8138
- Area code: 25
- Website: www.szabadhidveg.hu

Szabadhídvég is a village in Fejér county, Hungary.

== History ==
The first written mention of the village dates back to 1344 when a document refers to it as "villa Hiydwegh," indicating the name Hídvég. According to László Szita the settlement was completely Hungarian in the 18th century. Before the 20th century, the area had several settlements, but in 1922, it adopted its current boundaries and name through the consolidation of Városhidvég, Faluhidvég, and Szabadhegy. Among these, Városhidvég was the oldest and largest (with a population of 1,129, compared to Faluhidvég's 799 and Szabadhegy's 217 in 1910). Until 1950, it belonged to Somogy County and was later attached to Fejér County during the county reorganization of 1950. Between 1950 and 1954, it was united with Mezőkomárom, located on the other side of the Sió River, under the name Mezőhidvég.

As for the village's coat of arms, it is shield-shaped with green-white-silver-green colors, matching the colors of the village flag. In the center of the coat of arms is an image of a fortress, symbolizing the palisade and later earthworks that protected the Sió line during the Rákóczi War of Independence. The intertwined formation of three heart motifs represents the amalgamation of the three villages (Faluhídvég-Városhídvég-Szabadhegy) in 1922, marking the beginning of the name Szabadhídvég. The wavy line indicates that the village is located along the Sió river. The five-pointed noble crown is in honor of the 29 Hídvég families considered noble in the 1784 census. From 1688, the residents of Hídvég were obligated to military service, akin to nobles, thus paying with their blood. The green color symbolizes the agricultural nature of the village, while the white represents moral purity.
