= Iszkaszentgyörgy =

- Location of Fejér county in Hungary

- Location of Iszkaszentgyörgy
- Coordinates: 47.23865°N 18.30141°E
- Country: Hungary
- County: Fejér

Area
  - Total: 26.27 km^{2} (10.14 sq mi)

Population (2004)
  - Total: 1,901
  - Density: 72.36/km^{2} (187.4/sq mi)
- Time zone: UTC+1 (CET)
  - Summer (DST): UTC+2 (CEST)
- Postal code: 8043
- Area code: 22
- Website: www.iszkaszentgyorgy.hu

Iszkaszentgyörgy is a village in Fejér county, Hungary.

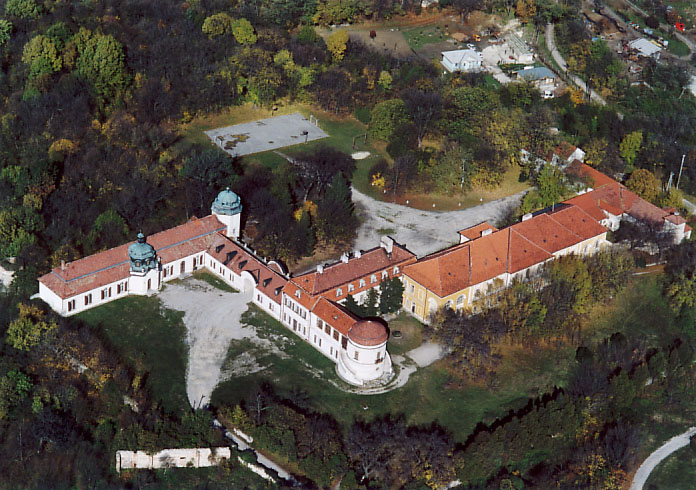
Aerial photography of a palace in Iszakszentgyörgy
