= Sárkeresztes =

- Location of Fejér county in Hungary

- Location of Sárkeresztes
- Coordinates: 47.25164°N 18.35307°E
- Country: Hungary
- County: Fejér

Area
  - Total: 23.27 km^{2} (8.98 sq mi)

Population (2015)
  - Total: 1,525
  - Density: 64.71/km^{2} (167.6/sq mi)
- Time zone: UTC+1 (CET)
  - Summer (DST): UTC+2 (CEST)
- Postal code: 8051
- Area code: 22
- Website: www.sarkeresztes.hu

Sárkeresztes is a village in Fejér county, Hungary.
