= Bakonykúti =

- Location of Bakonykúti
- Coordinates: 47.24544°N 18.19757°E
- Country: Hungary
- County: Fejér

Government
  - Mayor: Marics József (Ind.)

Area
  - Total: 12.45 km^{2} (4.81 sq mi)

Population (2022)
  - Total: 161
  - Density: 12.9/km^{2} (33.5/sq mi)
- Time zone: UTC+1 (CET)
  - Summer (DST): UTC+2 (CEST)
- Postal code: 8046
- Area code: 22
- Website: www.bakonykuti.hu

Bakonykúti is a village in Fejér county, Hungary.
