= Vajta, Hungary =

Vajta
- Flag Coat of arms

- Location of Fejér county in Hungary

- Location of Vajta, Hungary
- Coordinates: 46.71883°N 18.66488°E
- Country: Hungary
- County: Fejér

Area
  - Total: 23.43 km^{2} (9.05 sq mi)

Population (2004)
  - Total: 949
  - Density: 40.5/km^{2} (105/sq mi)
- Time zone: UTC+1 (CET)
  - Summer (DST): UTC+2 (CEST)
- Postal code: 7041
- Area code: 25
- Website: www.vajta.hu

Vajta is a village in Fejér county, Hungary.

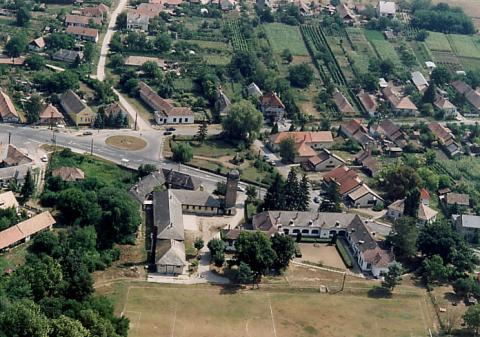
Aerial photography of Vajta
