= Sáregres =

- Location of Fejér county in Hungary

- Location of Sáregres
- Coordinates: 46.78523°N 18.59382°E
- Country: Hungary
- County: Fejér

Area
  - Total: 26.16 km^{2} (10.10 sq mi)

Population (2004)
  - Total: 801
  - Density: 30.61/km^{2} (79.3/sq mi)
- Time zone: UTC+1 (CET)
  - Summer (DST): UTC+2 (CEST)
- Postal code: 7014
- Area code: 25
- Website: www.saregres.hu

Sáregres is a village in Fejér county, Hungary.
