= Söréd =

- Location of Fejér county in Hungary

- Location of Söréd
- Coordinates: 47.32364°N 18.27878°E
- Country: Hungary
- County: Fejér

Area
  - Total: 6.25 km^{2} (2.41 sq mi)

Population (2007-12-31)
  - Total: 505
  - Density: 72.48/km^{2} (187.7/sq mi)
- Time zone: UTC+1 (CET)
  - Summer (DST): UTC+2 (CEST)
- Postal code: 8072
- Area code: 22
- Website: www.sored.hu

Söréd is a village in Fejér county, Hungary.
