= Nagyveleg =

- Flag Coat of arms

- Location of Nagyveleg
- Coordinates: 47.36053°N 18.10936°E
- Country: Hungary
- County: Fejér

Area
  - Total: 13.18 km^{2} (5.09 sq mi)

Population (2001)
  - Total: 720
  - Density: 54.63/km^{2} (141.5/sq mi)
- Time zone: UTC+1 (CET)
  - Summer (DST): UTC+2 (CEST)
- Postal code: 8065
- Area code: 22
- Website: www.nagyveleg.hu

Nagyveleg is a village in Fejér county, Hungary.

== Location ==
Nagyveleg is 35 km (22 mi) north-west from Székesfehérvár, between the Vértes and Bakony mountains.

== History ==
Nagyveleg is a village that was first mentioned in a document in 1230. During the Ottoman wars the village was destroyed. It was re-founded in 1746, and has since developed into a thriving community.
