= Alsószentiván =

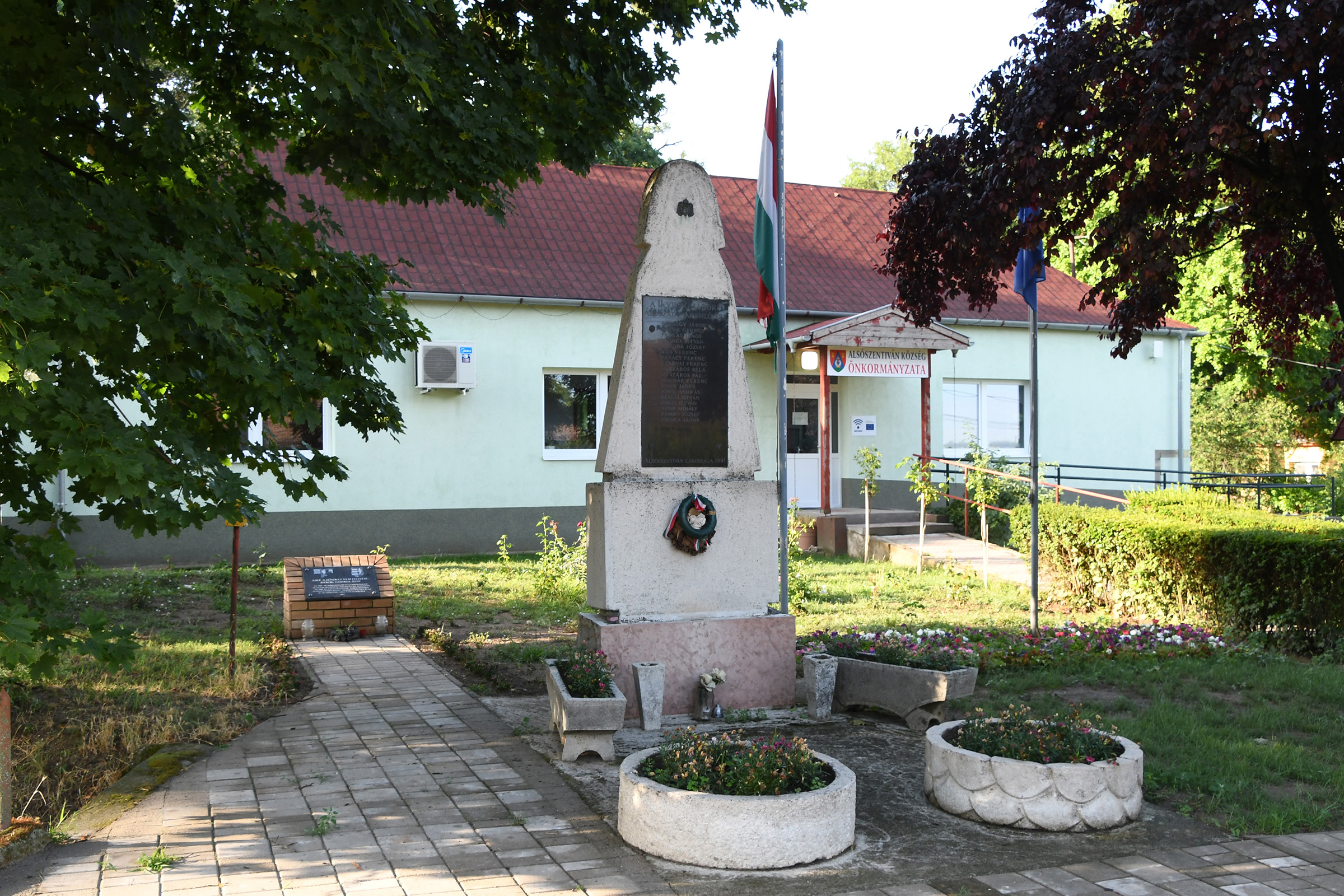
- Village hall

- Coat of arms

- Location of Alsószentiván in Hungary
- Coordinates: 46.7913°N 18.7326°E
- Country: Hungary
- Region: Central Transdanubia
- County: Fejér

Area
  - Total: 39.65 km^{2} (15.31 sq mi)
- Elevation: 148 m (486 ft)

Population (2012)
  - Total: 608
  - Density: 15.3/km^{2} (39.7/sq mi)
- Time zone: UTC+1 (CET)
  - Summer (DST): UTC+2 (CEST)
- Postal code: 7012
- Area code: +36 25
- Website: http://alsoszentivan.hu/

Alsószentiván is a village in Fejér county in Hungary. One of its main streets is called Ady Endre utca, named after the famous Hungarian writer Ady Endre.
