= Magyaralmás =

- Location of Fejér county in Hungary

- Location of Magyaralmás
- Coordinates: 47.29173°N 18.32337°E
- Country: Hungary
- County: Fejér

Area
  - Total: 22.42 km^{2} (8.66 sq mi)

Population (2004)
  - Total: 1,491
  - Density: 66.5/km^{2} (172/sq mi)
- Time zone: UTC+1 (CET)
  - Summer (DST): UTC+2 (CEST)
- Postal code: 8071
- Area code: 22
- Website: www.magyaralmas.hu

Magyaralmás is a village in Fejér county, Hungary.
