= Csókakő =

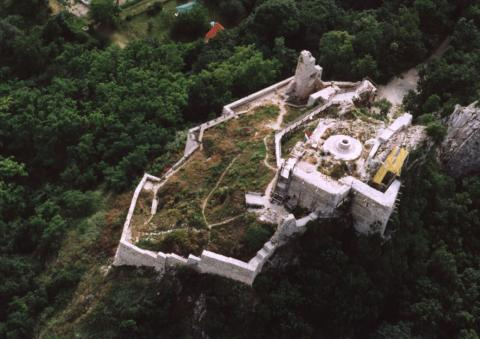
- Medieval castle in Csókakő

- Flag Coat of arms

- Location of Csókakő
- Coordinates: 47.35333°N 18.27312°E
- Country: Hungary
- County: Fejér

Government
  - Mayor: Fűrész Györg (Fidesz)

Area
  - Total: 10.92 km^{2} (4.22 sq mi)

Population (2024)
  - Total: 1,578
  - Density: 144.5/km^{2} (374.3/sq mi)
- Time zone: UTC+1 (CET)
  - Summer (DST): UTC+2 (CEST)
- Postal code: 8074
- Area code: 22
- Website: www.csokako.hu

Csókakő is a village in Fejér county, Hungary.
