= Alap, Hungary =

Alap
- Coat of arms

- Location of Alap in Hungary
- Coordinates: 46.81°N 18.6805°E
- Country: Hungary
- Region: Central Transdanubia
- County: Fejér

Area
  - Total: 48.29 km^{2} (18.64 sq mi)

Population (2017)
  - Total: 1,860
  - Density: 38.5/km^{2} (99.8/sq mi)
- Time zone: UTC+1 (CET)
  - Summer (DST): UTC+2 (CEST)
- Postal code: 7011
- Area code: +36 25
- Website: https://www.alap.hu/

Alap is a village in Fejér county, Hungary.
