= Central Transdanubia =

Coordinates: 47°11′20″N 18°24′50″E

Central Transdanubia Közép-Dunántúl
- Region
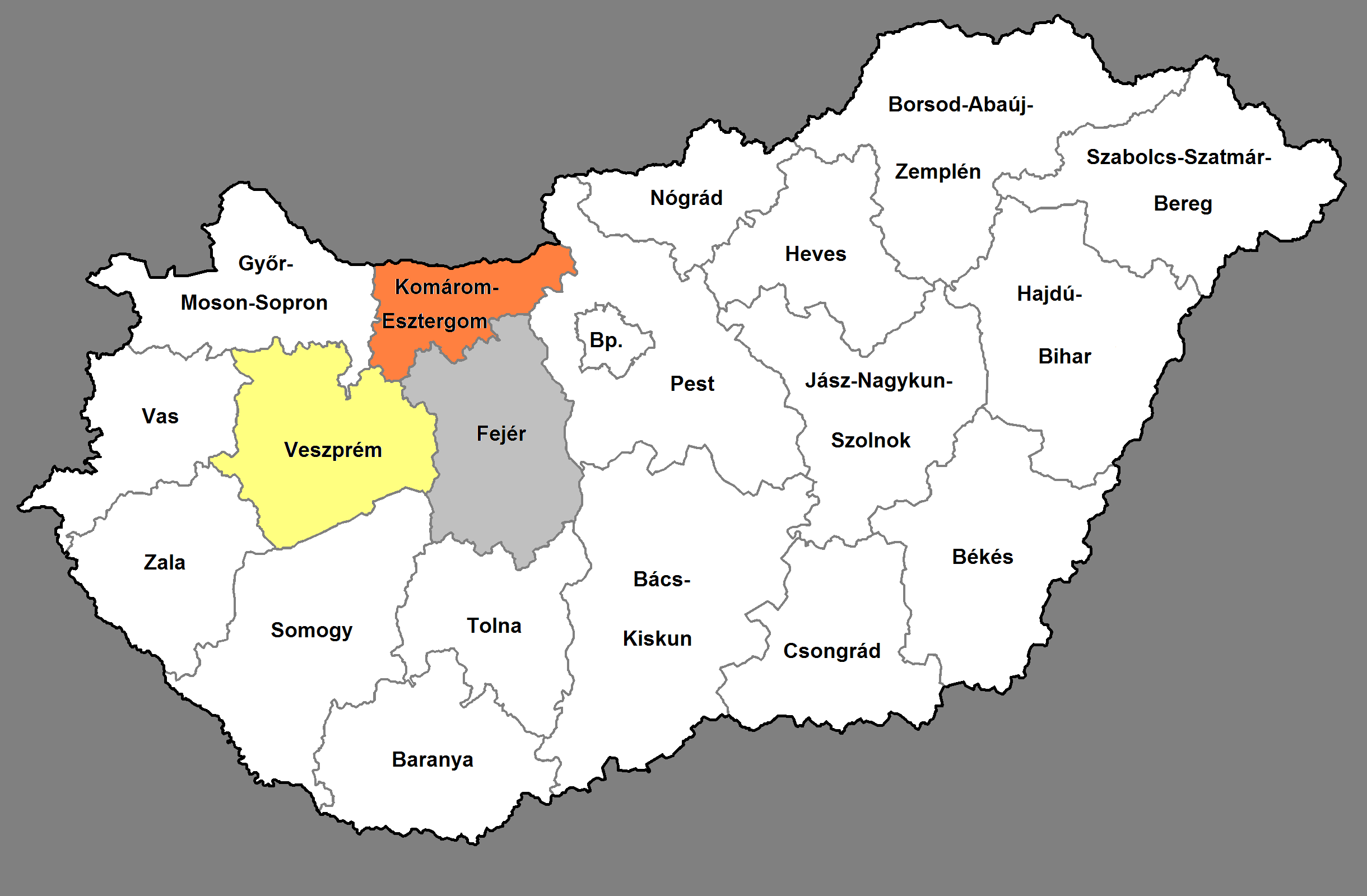
- Country: Hungary
- Capital city: Székesfehérvár

Area
  - Total: 11,237 km^{2} (4,339 sq mi)

Population
  - Total: 1,104,841

GDP
  - Total: €19.575 billion (2024)
  - Per capita: €18,625 (2024)
- Time zone: UTC+1 (CET)
  - Summer (DST): UTC+2 (CEST)
- NUTS code: HU21
- HDI (2019): 0.847 very high · 4th

Central Transdanubia (Hungarian: Közép-Dunántúl ['køzeːp 'dunaːntuːl]) is a statistical (NUTS 2) region of Hungary. The capital is Székesfehérvár. It is part of Transdanubia (NUTS 1) region. Central Transdanubia includes counties of Fejér, Komárom-Esztergom, and Veszprém.

== Description ==
The region borders Slovakia. The four neighboring regions are Western Transdanubia to the west, Southern Transdanubia to the south, and Pest County and the Southern Great Plain to the east.

The largest cities in Central Transdanubia are Tatabánya, Székesfehérvár, Dunaújváros, and Veszprém. The region has a population of 1,045,000 inhabitants (as of 2026) and covers an area of 11,237 km².

== See also ==
- List of regions of Hungary
