= List of palaces and mansions in Fejér County =

This is a list of palaces and mansions in Fejér County in Hungary.

== List of palaces and mansions in Fejér County ==
Name	Location	Established	Architect	Style	Family	Picture	Present function
Holczer–Jászay–Janiga–Spingler Mansion	Belsőbáránd (part of Aba)						
Zichy Mansion	Bodakajtor-Felsőszentiván (part of Aba)						
Habsburg Palace	Alcsútdoboz	1819-1827	Mihály Pollack; Ferenc Heyne	Classicism	Habsburg		Arboretum
Szluha Mansion	Alsószentiván						
Batthyány Palace	Bicske	1854-1855	József Hild	Baroque; Classicism	Batthyány		Children's home
Hochburg–Lamberg Palace	Bodajk	1837–1839		Classicism	Hochburg; Berényi; Zichy; Bethlen; Miske; Megyeri Krausz; Grünfeld		Empty
Marsovszky Mansion	Bodajk						
Miske–Grünfeld Mansion	Bodajk						
Lamberg Mansion	Csákberény						
Esterházy Palace	Csákvár	1760 – 1765	Jakab Fellner; Charles Moreau	Classicism	Eszterházy		Hospital
Végh Mansion	Csókakő						
Szőgyény-Marich–Simssich Mansion	Csór						
Festetics Palace	Dég	1810 – 1815	Mihály Pollack	Classicism	Festetics		Museum
Festetics Mansion	Dég						
Dóra Mansion	Pálhalma (part of Dunaújváros)						
ciszterci Mansion	Előszállás						
ciszterci Mansion	Róbertvölgy (part of Előszállás)						
Batthyány–Draskovich–Csekonics Mansion	Enying						
Károlyi Palace	Fehérvárcsurgó	1844 – 1851	Henrich Koch; Miklós Ybl	Classicism; Eclecticism; Baroque	Károlyi		Hotel; Museum
Ürményi–Hartig–Nádasdy Mansion	Agárdpuszta (part of Gárdony)						
Batthyány–Zichy–Sennyei Mansion	Hantos						
Strasszer Mansion	Vámpuszta (part of Igar)						
Amadé–Bajzáth–Pappenheim Mansion	Iszkaszentgyörgy	1735	Mihály Langmasy	Baroque; Neobaroque	Amadé; Bajzáth; Pappenheim		School; House of Culture; Sport hall
Farádi Vörös–Végh Mansion	Kajászó						
Zichy–Széchényi Palace	Belmajor (part of Káloz)	1810		Neo-Renaissance; Classicism	Zichy; Széchenyi		
Halász Mansion	Kápolnásnyék						
Cziráky Palace	Lovasberény	1699 (rebuilt 1763-1767) (rebuilt 1780) (rebuilt 1804-1809) (rebuilt 1850)	János Rieder; Jakab Rieder; Miklós Ybl	Baroque (earlier); Classicism (currently)	Cziráky		
Brunszvik Mansion	Martonvásár	1783-1785		Neogothic; Baroque	Brunszvik		
Lonkay Mansion	Mátyásdomb						
Huszár–Bárándy–Szécsy–Blaskovich–Szabó–Droppa Mansion	Mezőszilas						
Kenessey–Lorsy–Salamon–Strommel Mansion	Mezőszilas						
Lamberg Palace	Mór	1763 - 1766	Jakab Fellner	Baroque	Lamberg		
Luzsénszky–Festetics–Trauttenberg Mansion	Mór						
Luzsénszky–Trauttenberg Mansion	Mór	1791		Zopf			Mayor's office
Nádasdy Mansion	Nádasdladány	1873–1876	István Linzbauer; Alajos Hauszmann	Tudor; Romanticism	Nádasdy		Museum
Lyka Mansion	Pázmánd						
Győry Mansion	Perkáta						
Fould-Springer–Wooster Mansion	Pusztaszabolcs	19th century		Eclecticism	Fould-Springer; Wooster		Dormitory
Halász Mansion	Felsőcikola (part of Pusztaszabolcs)						
Halász–Freund Mansion	Ráckeresztúr						
Lyka–Brauch Mansion	Szentmiklóspuszta (part of Ráckeresztúr)						
Zichy Mansion	Nagyhörcsökpuszta (part of Sárbogárd)						
Episcopal Palace	Sárkeresztúr						
Esterházy Mansion	Sárosd						
Zichy–Szterényi Mansion	Sárszentmihály						
Zichy–Hadik Palace	Seregélyes	1821		Classicism	Zichy		
Zichy Mansion	Nagyláng (part of Soponya)	1751-1757 (rebuilt in 1807)	Mihály Pollack	Baroque	Zichy		
Popovics Mansion	Lajostelep (part of Szabadbattyán)						
Nedeczky–Griebsch Mansion	Középszolgaegyháza (part of Szabadegyháza)						
Bory Castle	Öreghegy-Máriavölgy (part of Székesfehérvár)	1923–1964	Jenő Bory	Eclecticism	Bory		Museum
Kégl Mansion	Csalapuszta (part of Székesfehérvár)	1876–1878	Alajos Hauszmann	Neo-Renaissance	Kégl		
Simay–Holtzer Mansion	Kisfalud (part of Székesfehérvár)						
Sajnovics–Batthyány–Dreher Mansion	Tordas						
Zichy Mansion	Vajta	1923	Lipót Havel; Miksa Schmidt	Neoclassicism	Zichy		
Zichy–Weinckheim Mansion	Vajta						
Ürményi Palace	Vál	1780 - 1800	Fidel Kasselik	Zopf			
Beck Mansion	Velence						
Hauszmann–Gschwindt Mansion	Velence	1923	Alajos Hauszmann	Eclecticism; Neobaroque	Hauszmann; Gschwindt	200px	
Meszleny Mansion	Velence						
Meszleny–Wenckheim Mansion	Velence						
Zichy Mansion	Újfalupuszta (part of Zichyújfalu)	1860	Miklós Ybl (?)	Eclecticism; Romanticism	Zichy		
Bissingen–Zichy Mansion	Aba						
Zichy–Bolváry Mansion	Aba						
Zichy Mansion	Adony						
Korsós Mansion	Baracska						
Kozma Mansion	Baracska						
Ódor Mansion	Baracska						
Raymand Mansion	Baracska						
Magasházy Mansion	Gellértpuszta (part of Baracska)						
Csók–Szluha–Kiss Mansion	Cece						
Festetics Mansion	Dég						
Montbach–Frankl Mansion	Dunaújváros						
Sigray Mansion	Sándorpuszta (part of Dunaújváros)						
Frankl Mansion	Szedrespuszta (part of Dunaújváros)						
Schrikker Mansion	Balatonbozsok (part of Enying)						
Eötvös Mansion	Ercsi						
Wimpffen Mansion	Ercsi						
Wimpffen–Zerkovitz Mansion	Sinatelep (part of Ercsi)						
pérposti Mansion	Dinnyés (part of Gárdony)						
Fiáth–Nagy Mansion	Hantos						
Kenessey Mansion	Kápolnásnyék						
Halász Mansion	Kápolnásnyék						
Vörösmarty Mansion	Kápolnásnyék						
Trauttenberg–Ivánka Mansion	Pátka						
Palkovits Mansion	Kisperkáta (part of Perkáta)						
Haggenmacher Hunting Lodge	Pusztavám						
Jankovich Mansion	Rácalmás						
Zichy Mansion	Kislók (part of Sárbogárd)						
Zichy Mansion	Sárszentmiklós (part of Sárbogárd)						
Zichy–Szterényi Mansion	Sárszentmihály						
Zichy–Grünfeld–Gerlóczi Mansion	Tarnóca (part of Soponya)						
Zichy Mansion	Világospuszta (part of Tác)						
Manndorff–Wickenburg Mansion	Velence						
Gräber Mansion	Aba						
Fiáth Mansion	Középhantos (part of Hantos)						
Farkas Mansion	Farkasismánd (part of Mezőfalva)						
Dániel Mansion	Pettend (part of Kápolnásnyék)						
Földváry–Luczenbacher Mansion	Pettend (part of Kápolnásnyék)						
Haltenberger Mansion	Pettend (part of Kápolnásnyék)						
Sárközy Mansion	Pettend (part of Kápolnásnyék)						
Széchenyi Mansion	Sárpentele (part of Sárszentmihály						
Zichy Mansion	Hippolitpuszta (part of Szabadegyháza)						
Meszleny–Mandorff–Pick Mansion	Tükröspuszta (part of Velence)						
Zichy Mansion	Újfalupuszta (part of Zichyújfalu)						

== See also ==
- List of palaces and mansions in Hungary
- List of castles in Hungary

== Literature ==
- Zsolt Virág : Magyar kastélylexikon 3. Fejér megye kastélyai és kúriái - Fejér megye kastélyai és kúriái (Castellum Novum, 2002, ISBN 9789632027968)
