= Enying District =

Enying District Enyingi járás
- Districts of Hungary
- Coat of arms

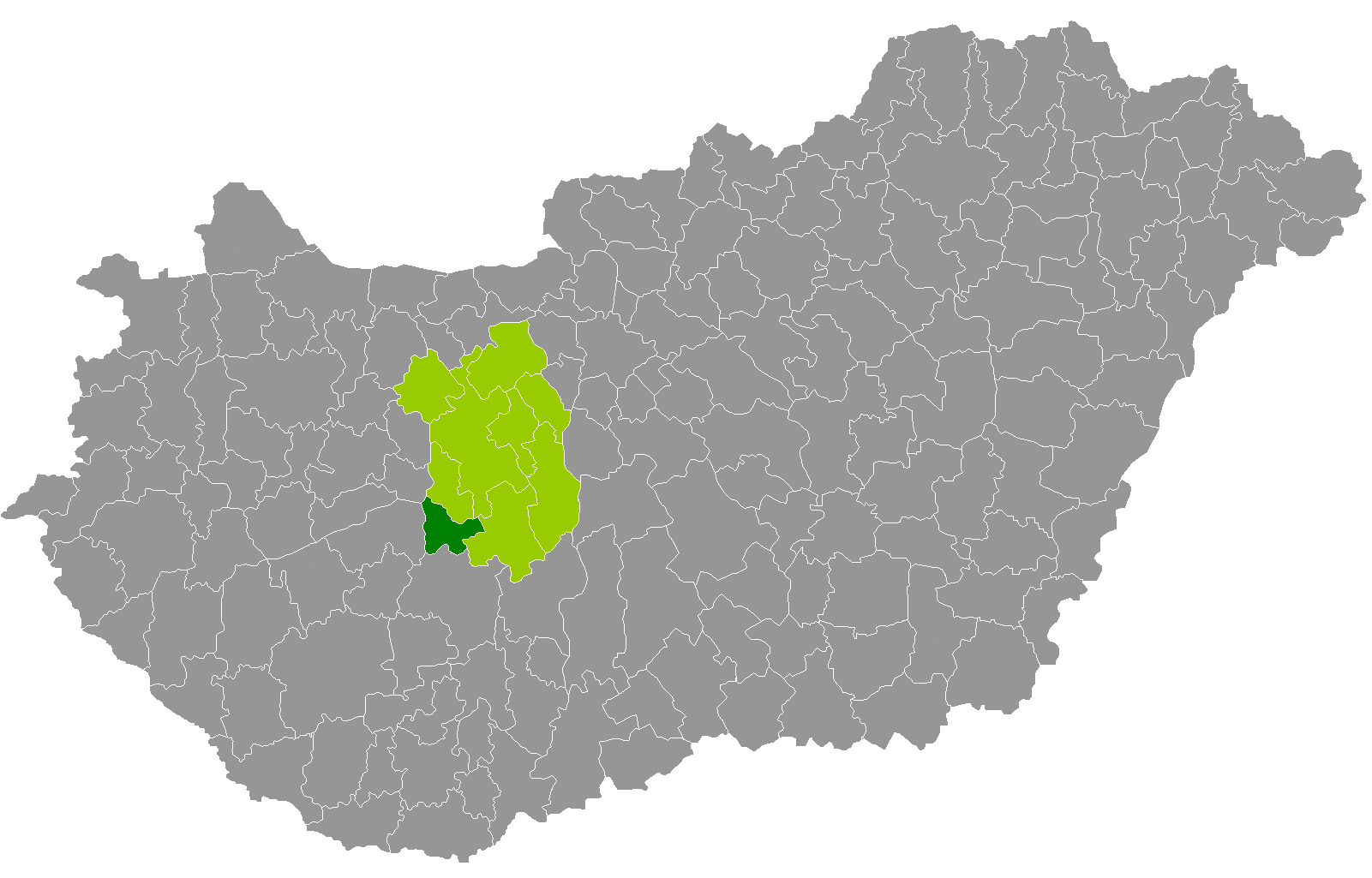
- Enying District within Hungary and Fejér County.
- Coordinates: 46.9254°N 18.2486°E
- Country: Hungary
- County: Fejér
- District seat: Enying

Area
  - Total: 433.12 km^{2} (167.23 sq mi)
  - Rank: 5th in Fejér

Population (2011 census)
  - Total: 20,075
  - Rank: 8th in Fejér
  - Density: 46/km^{2} (120/sq mi)

Enying (Hungarian: Enyingi járás) is a district in south-western part of Fejér County. Enying is also the name of the town where the district seat is found. The district is located in the Central Transdanubia Statistical Region.

== Geography ==
Enying District borders with Székesfehérvár District to the north, Sárbogárd District to the east, Tamási District (Tolna County) to the south, Siófok District (Somogy County) and Balatonalmádi District (Veszprém County) to the west. The number of the inhabited places in Enying District is 9.

== Municipalities ==
The district has 1 town, 2 large villages and 6 villages. (ordered by population, as of 1 January 2012)

- Dég (2,047)
- **Enying** (6,768) – district seat
- Kisláng (2,346) – from (Polgárdi District) 01.01.2015
- Lajoskomárom (2,110)
- Lepsény (3,029) – from (Polgárdi District) 01.01.2015
- Mátyásdomb (723) – from (Polgárdi District) 01.01.2015
- Mezőkomárom (905)
- Mezőszentgyörgy (1,309) – from (Polgárdi District) 01.01.2015
- Szabadhídvég (838)

The bolded municipality is city, italics municipalities are large villages.

== See also ==
- List of cities and towns in Hungary
