= Lajoskomárom =

- Large village
- Flag Coat of arms

- Location of Fejér county in Hungary

- Location of Lajoskomárom
- Coordinates: 46.84211°N 18.33932°E
- Country: Hungary
- County: Fejér
- District: Enying

Government
  - Mayor: Pirtyák Zsolt (Ind.)

Area
  - Total: 75.67 km^{2} (29.22 sq mi)

Population (2022)
  - Total: 2,019
  - Density: 26.68/km^{2} (69.11/sq mi)
- Time zone: UTC+1 (CET)
  - Summer (DST): UTC+2 (CEST)
- Postal code: 8136
- Area code: (+36) 25

Lajoskomárom (German: Loischkomorn) is a village in Fejér County, Hungary.

== History ==
The village of Lajoskomárom was settled by the aristocratic Batthyány family in 1802. Its name is derived from the name of its founder Lajos Batthyány and from the neighbouring village of Mezőkomárom, to which the area of Lajoskomárom used to belong. The settlers were of three different ethnicities (Germans, Hungarians and Slovaks). The biggest group were the Danube Swabians, most of whom were Lutherans with a Catholic minority. They didn't come directly from abroad, but rather from areas in modern-day Hungary already settled by ethnic Germans, most notably from Pusztavám and Tolna county. The second ones in terms of population were the Hungarians, who belonged to three distinct denominations (Catholicism, Lutheranism, Calvinism) and who arrived from various areas of Western Hungary. The Slovaks were uniformly Lutheran and mostly originated from Oroszlány. The three church towers in the crest of the village, symbolize the three denominations historically and currently present in the community.
