= Lepsény =

- Large village
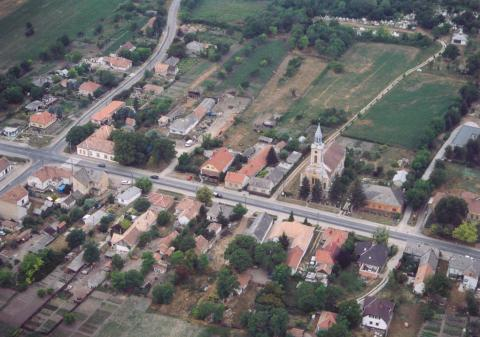
- Aerial photograph of Lepsény

- Flag Coat of arms

- Location of Lepsény
- Coordinates: 46.99310°N 18.2456°E
- Country: Hungary
- County: Fejér
- District: Enying

Government
  - Mayor: Salamon Béla (Ind.)

Area
  - Total: 39.08 km^{2} (15.09 sq mi)

Population (2022)
  - Total: 3,082
  - Density: 78.86/km^{2} (204.3/sq mi)
- Time zone: UTC+1 (CET)
  - Summer (DST): UTC+2 (CEST)
- Postal code: 8132
- Area code: (+36) 22
- Motorways: M7
- Distance from Budapest: 87.1 km (54.1 mi) Northeast

Lepsény is a village in Fejér county, Hungary.
