= Kajászó =

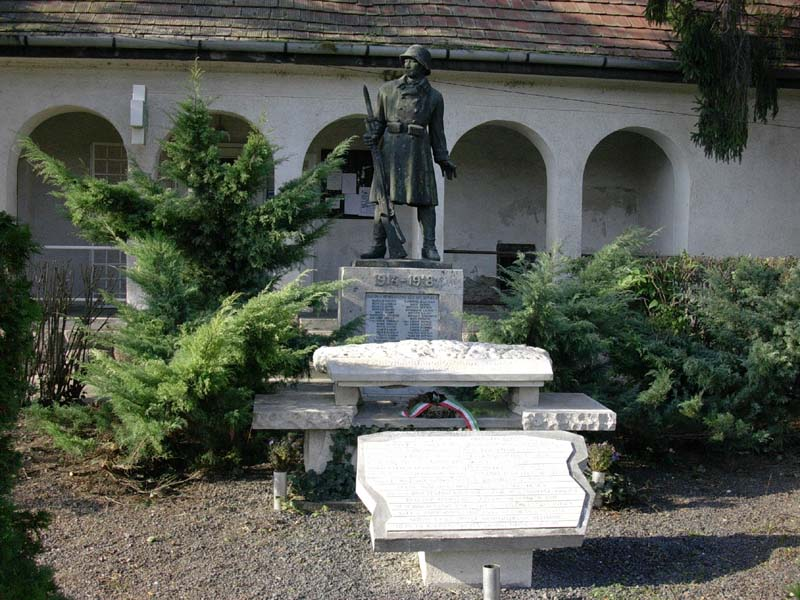

- Flag Coat of arms

- Location of Fejér county in Hungary

- Location of Kajászó
- Coordinates: 47.32390°N 18.71978°E
- Country: Hungary
- County: Fejér

Area
  - Total: 23.98 km^{2} (9.26 sq mi)

Population (2004)
  - Total: 1,007
  - Density: 41.99/km^{2} (108.8/sq mi)
- Time zone: UTC+1 (CET)
  - Summer (DST): UTC+2 (CEST)
- Postal code: 2472
- Area code: 22
- Motorways: M7
- Distance from Budapest: 40.6 km (25.2 mi) Northeast
- Website: www.kajaszo.hu

Kajászó is a village in Fejér county, Hungary.

== Location ==
Kajászó is located 35 kilometers southwest of Budapest, about halfway between the capital and Székesfehérvár, in the Vál Valley, 2 kilometers from the M7 motorway, along the road 811 between Baracska and Alcsútdoboz.

== Origin of the name Kajászó ==
The Huns, who attacked the Roman Empire from the east, crossed the Danube near today's Százhalombatta. A significant battle took place in Tárnok Valley. The Hun leader Keve fell in the battle, and is said to be buried there. According to some sources, Attila the Hun himself rests in this area.

The name of the settlement was originally Keveháza (house of Keve), then Keveaszó, (Cuwe azoa, Keueozou), later Keazó, and finally Kajászó with today's pronunciation. Keve's memory is carried on in the name of the local agricultural co-op, Keve RT, and the local sport club, Keve SC.

1491: The village is named after its patron saint: Kajászószentpéter.

1950: The communist Ministry of Interior abbreviates the name to Kajászó.

== History ==
Kajászó is an ancient settlement: excavations indicate that it was already inhabited around 1600 BC. During the Roman Empire, it was part of the province of Pannonia. The settlement's Roman name is unknown, but Roman remains prove occupation.

Towards the end of the Turkish occupation, following a series of lootings, Kajászó was completely depopulated by 1686, and only around 1710 did landowners return.

During the Napoleonic Wars, the importance of the Hungarian territories grew. The demand for agricultural products and animals for the empire increased. Kajászó experienced a much welcome boom and flourished. The village was almost completely rebuilt.

From then until World War I, development was continuous and balanced. More difficult times arrived during the war, however, when almost every family lost a man. The heroes are honored with a monument.

Between the two world wars, Kajászó flourished again: mainly from milk production, as nearby Budapest was a huge market. Farmers grew stronger, set up a cooperative, and built a milk collection station. The village gained a national reputation for cattle farming.

During the World War II, the front line crossed over Kajászó several times, and the destruction was correspondingly enormous. Hardly any houses were left intact. Few live animals and little food could be found in the village.

After World War II, during the years of communism, all the results of the active period between the two world wars were erased by government policies. For an extended time, Kajászó was left out of most national development projects and public works.

== Kajászó today ==
Recently, the village has begun to see new development again. The population is constantly growing. Serious investments and developments were made in the settlement in the 1990s and 2000s. Now all utilities are present: water, electricity, gas, sewer, and broadband internet. Surface water drainage was completed in 2003.

In 2007, the village was reassigned from the Ercsi micro-region to the Bicske micro-region.

Several companies have settled in Kajászó recently, making greenfield investments .

The area around the village offers excellent opportunities for cross-country riding. The proximity of the highway, the varied but gentle topography, and the excellent soil quality for horses are ideal for the sport. As the closest large area suitable for riding on the "Buda side" of the capital, the landscape regularly attracts equestrian enthusiasts.

The youth team won the 2007/2008 football championship.

On June 4, 2011, the runic place name plate of the settlement was inaugurated.

== History ==
=== Mayors ===
- 1990–1994: Gábor Böcz Jr. (independent)
- 1994–1998: Gábor Böcz (independent)
- 1998–1999: Gábor Böcz (independent)
- 1999-2002: Béla Eight (independent)
- 2002-2006: Eszter Cziglánné Murányi (independent)
- 2006-2007: Eszter Cziglánné Murányi (independent)
- 2007–2010: Ms. György Mohácsi Mária Keszthelyi (independent)
- 2010–2014: Györgyné Mohácsi (independent)
- 2014–2019: Györgyné Mohácsi (independent)
- From 2019: Császár Roland (independent)

The first mayor of the village after the regime change, Gábor Böcz, previously headed Kajászó for three years, between 1987 and 1990 as chairman of the council. He resigned in the summer of 1999, which necessitated the holding of an interim mayoral election in the village on 26 September 1999. He later returned to the town as a representative and deputy mayor at the same time.

The interesting thing about the municipal elections held on October 20, 2002, in Kajászó was that a total of 7 candidates ran for the title of mayor of the village, well above the national average. Such a large number of candidates could be voted in that year by residents of only 24 municipalities across the country, and there were examples of more (8 or 10) mayoral aspirants in seven other municipalities.

In the next municipal term, on 6 July 2007, an interim mayoral election was held in the village due to the resignation of the previous mayor. A relatively large number of 6 candidates ran for the post that year as well, the winner gaining a large majority of the votes, with a score of over 58%.

== Population ==
During the 2011 census, 85.3% of the population described themselves as Hungarian, 0.4% as Gypsy, and 0.7% as German (14.6% did not declare; due to dual identities, the total may be greater than 100%) . The religious distribution was as follows: Roman Catholic 24.7%, Hungarian Reformed Church 30.6%, Lutheran 2.2%, Greek Catholic 0.2%, non-denominational 15.7% (25.4% undeclared).

== Attractions ==
- World War I Memorial in the center of the village
- Reformed Church
- Artesian well on Rákóczi road
- World War I & II memorials
- Trianon flag
- Soccer field
- Loess wall with a World War II air raid shelter
- Local history collection
- Catholic chapel
- Riding stables
- Winery

== Born here ==
- In 1750 Baron János Andrássy, Major General
- In 1815 Imre Gaál was a Reformed pastor
- In 1823 Eleazar Szántó was the headmaster of the school
- In 1930, Gábor Borsányi was a music teacher in Tapolca

== Resources ==
- Béla Czanik: History of Kajászó (Saint Peter) Village and Reformed Church (2000)
- Béla Czanik: As I Saw Kajászószentpéter (2002)
- Béla Czanik: Our Service, Our Life (2003)

(All titles can be obtained in the municipality shops.)

- János Arany: Keveháza (1853)
