= Bodakajtor =

Coordinates: 47°04′N 18°30′E

- District
- Interactive map of Bodakajtor
- Country: Hungary
- Region: Central Transdanubia
- County: Fejér County
- Village: Aba

Government
  - Mayor: Mikula Lajos
- Elevation: 126 m (413 ft)
- Time zone: UTC+1 (CET)
  - Summer (DST): UTC+2 (CEST)
- Postal code: 8127

Bodakajtor is part of Aba in the Subregion of Aba, Fejér County, Hungary. It lies 5 kilometer North West from the center of the village. There is a community house in this part of the village.

== Demographics ==
There were 82 housing buildings in Bodakajtor where 371 people lived in 2011.
