= Aba Subregion =

Subregion in Fejér Country, Hungary

Coordinates: 47°02′N 18°31′E

Aba Subregon was a subregion in Fejér County, Hungary. Its center was Aba. It was the only subregion where the center is not a town or a city.

== Settlements ==
Aba	Csősz	Káloz	Sárkeresztúr	Sárosd
Sárszentágota	Seregélyes	Soponya	Tác
