= Zichy Mansion, Zichyújfalu =

Zichy Mansion
- Zichy-kastély
- Zichyújfalu
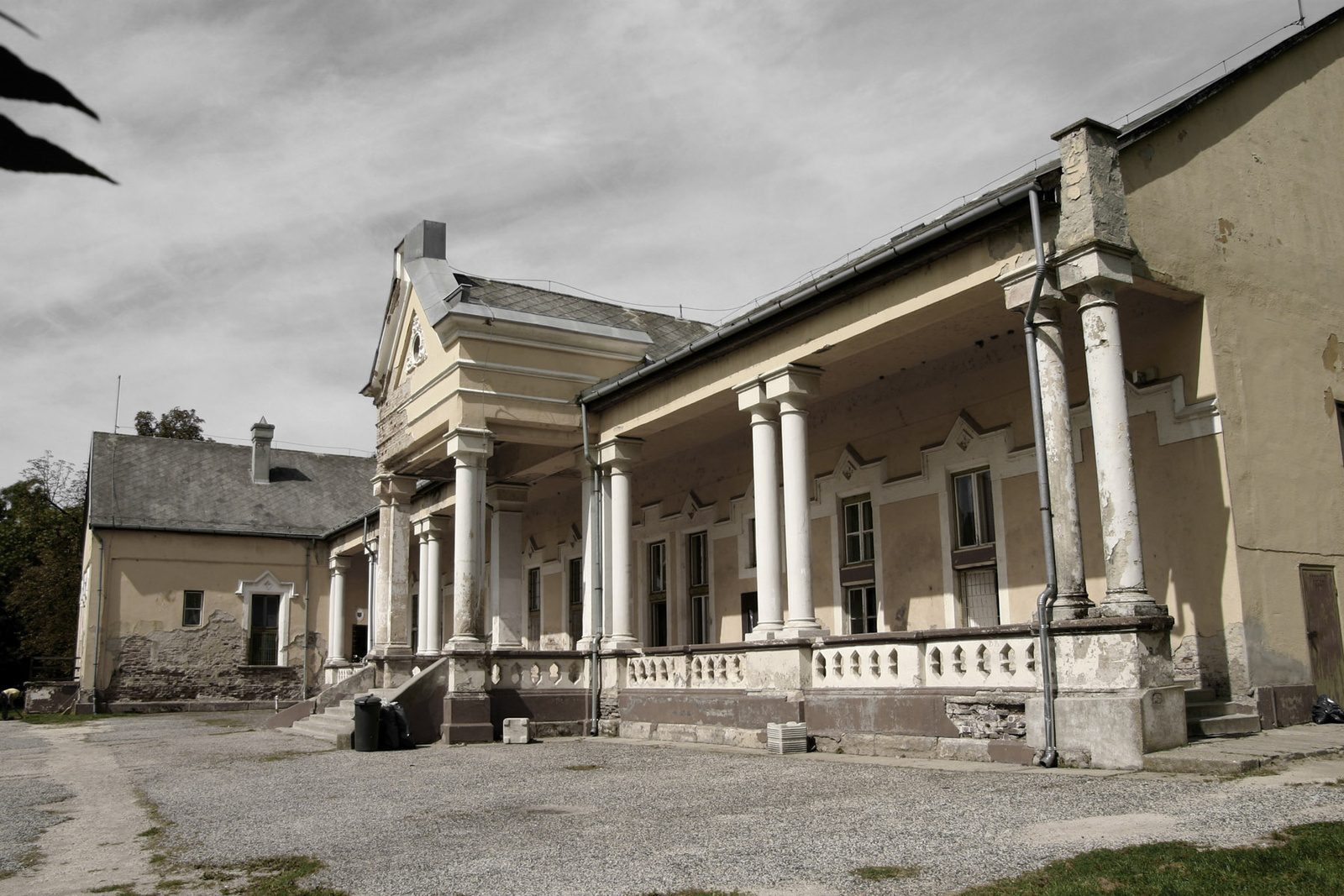
- Zichy Mansion

Site information
- Type: mansion
- Owner: Zichyújfalu municipality
- Condition: ruined

Location
- Zichy Mansion
- Coordinates: 47.131097°N 18.670682°E

Site history
- Built: 1800s
- Built by: Zichy family (1800s), János Zichy (rebuild in 1900s)
- In use: municipal office

The Zichy Mansion is an eclectic style manor house designed by János Zichy situated on 28 hectares in Zichyújfalu, Hungary. It dates from the 1800s, and belonged to the Zichy family.

== Gallery ==
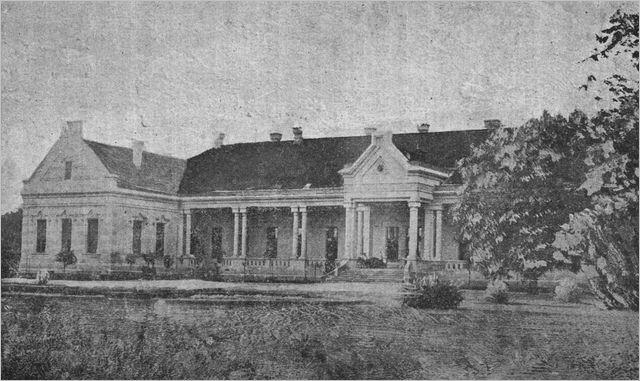
Zichy Mansion at 1904

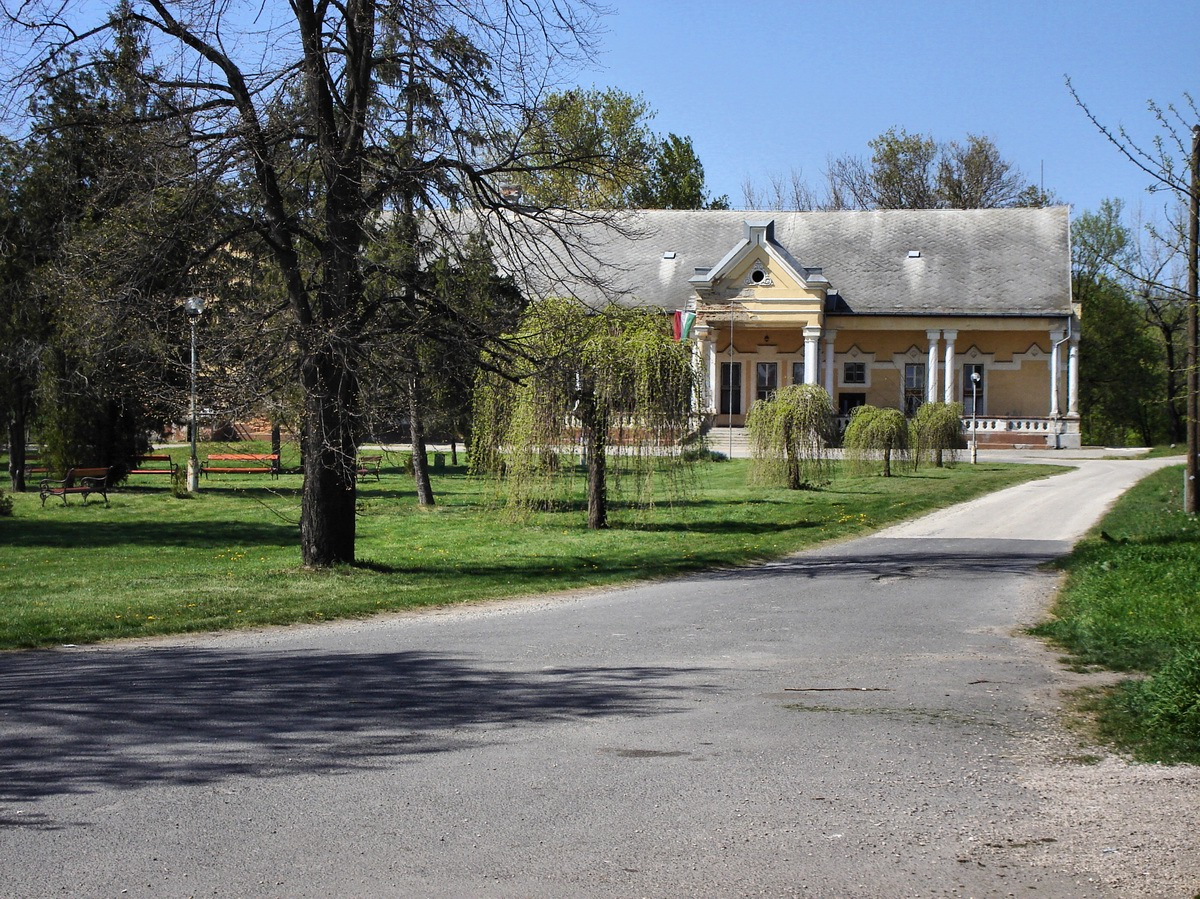
Zichy Mansion at 2007

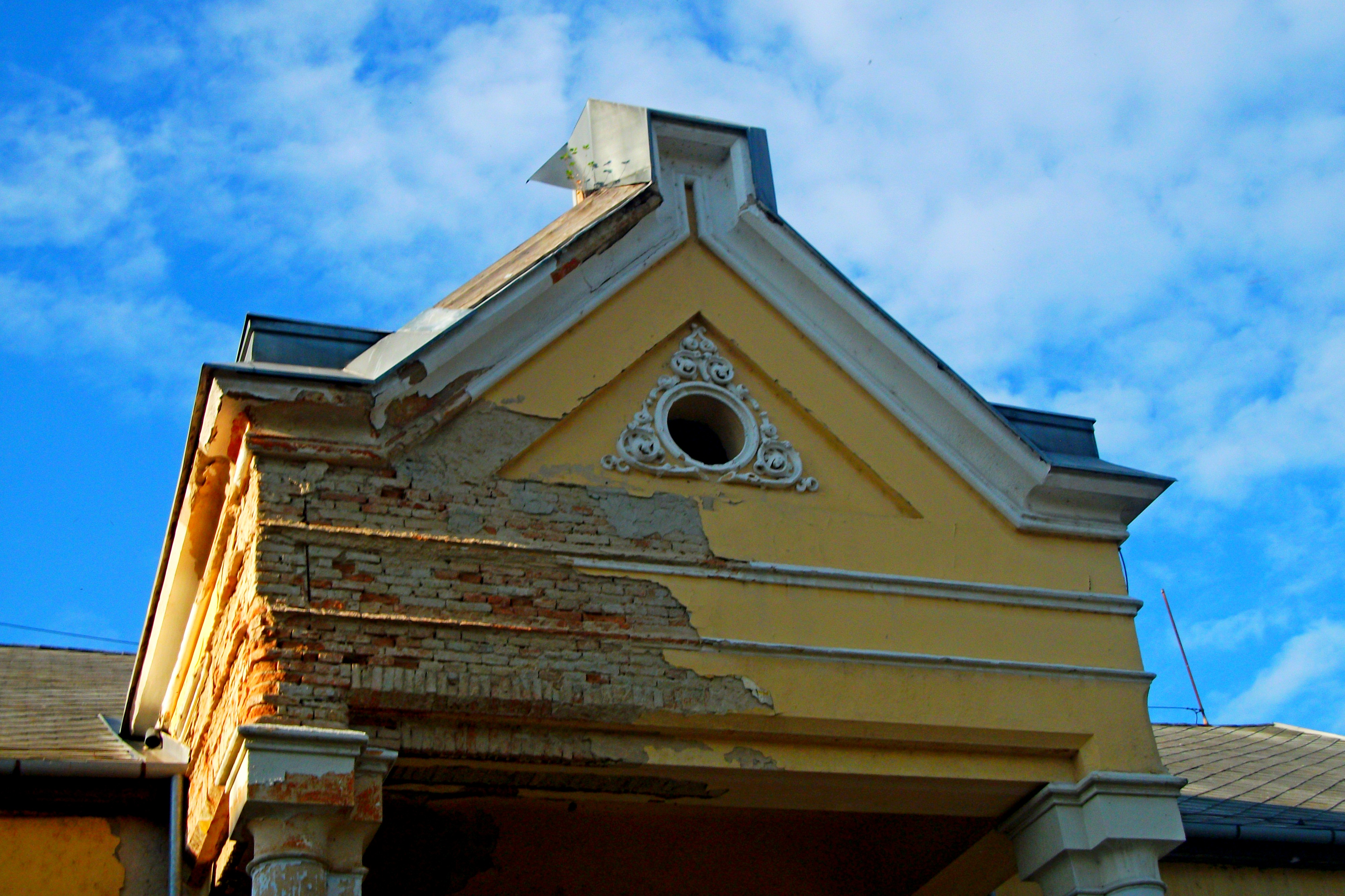
Crumbling building. The village local government has no money to renovate.

== See also ==
- List of castles in Hungary
