= Kápolnásnyék =

- Location of Fejér county in Hungary

- Location of Kápolnásnyék
- Coordinates: 47.24295°N 18.68460°E
- Country: Hungary
- County: Fejér

Area
  - Total: 41.5 km^{2} (16.0 sq mi)

Population (2004)
  - Total: 3,324
  - Density: 80.09/km^{2} (207.4/sq mi)
- Time zone: UTC+1 (CET)
  - Summer (DST): UTC+2 (CEST)
- Postal code: 2475
- Area code: 22
- Motorways: M7
- Distance from Budapest: 44.2 km (27.5 mi) Northeast
- Website: www.kapolnasnyek.hu

Kápolnásnyék is a village in Fejér county, Hungary.

== History ==
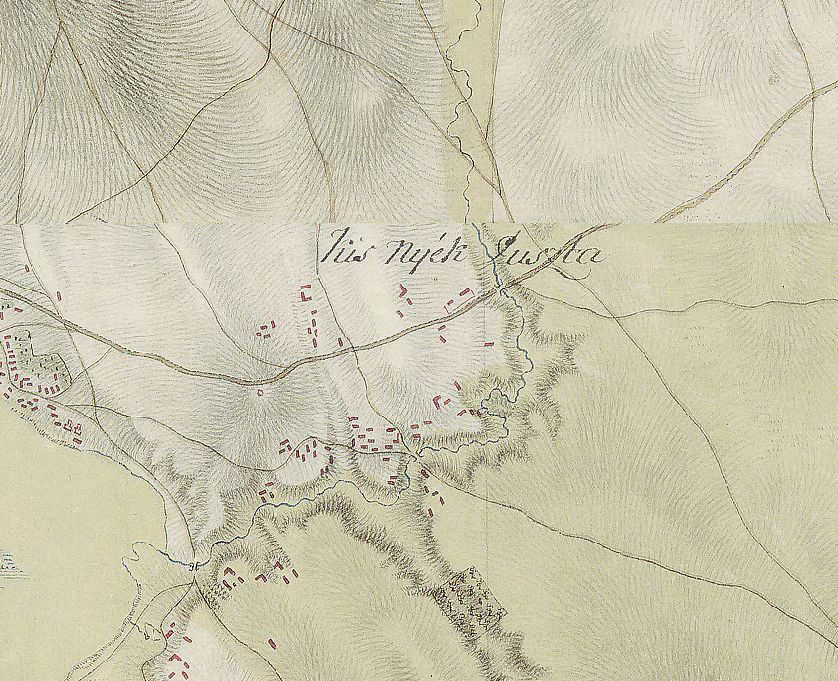
The map of Kápolnásnyék from the First Military Mapping Survey of Austria Empire.

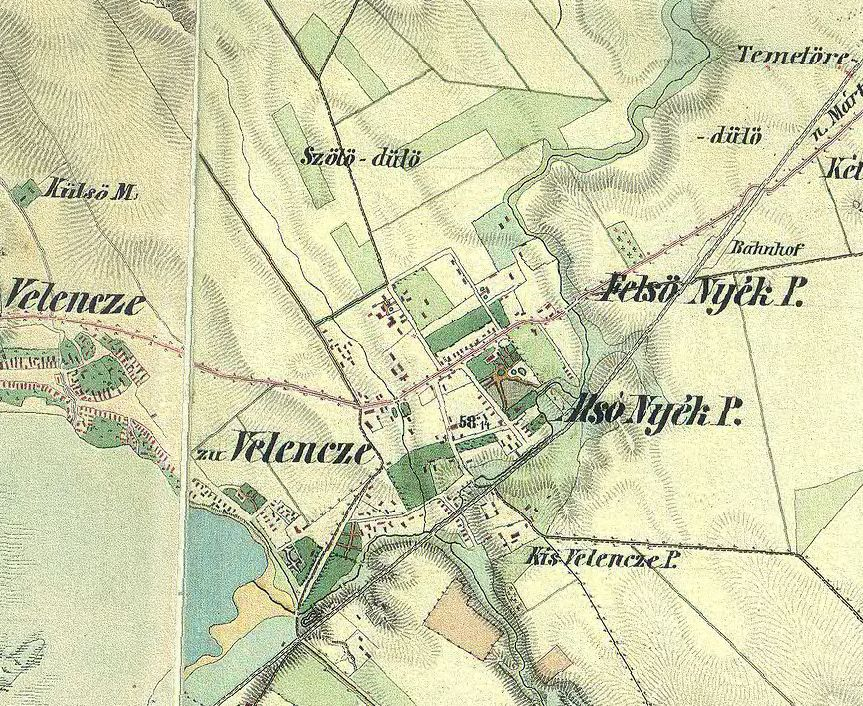
The map of Kápolnásnyék from the Second Military Mapping Survey of Austria Empire.

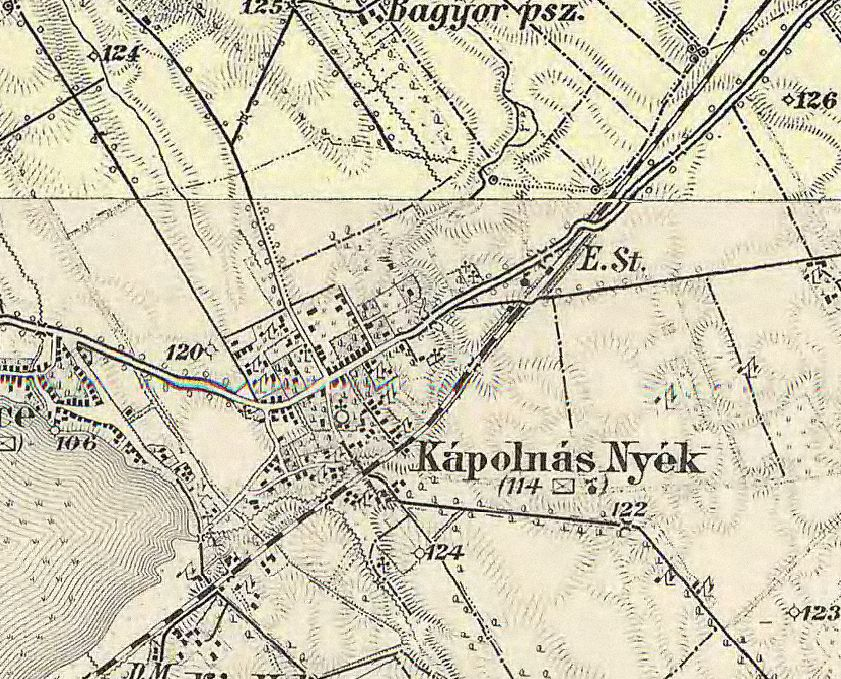
The map of Kápolnásnyék from the 3rd Military Mapping Survey of Austria Empire.

The excavations in the surroundings revealed bronze-age artifacts, proving that the area was already populated in ancient times.

The name of the settlement originates from the name of the Nyék, tribe (coming to Hungary during the settlement of Hungarian tribes), the first residents belonged probably to a subgroup of the tribe. When István I. defeated Koppány, Nyék became a land of the queen. The name of the settlement is mentioned first in 1193 as Neck. Later the names Kápolnás Nyék, Káposztás Nyék, and Fertőfő Nyék are used to mention this rather insignificant settlement located between Buda and Fehérvár, to the south of the commercial route. As a border village Kápolnásnyék suffered from double taxation during the Turkish occupation (both Hungary and the Turkish Empire collected taxes), therefore the population of the village decreased considerably, it even turned uninhabited during the Turkish camping of 1543. The inhabitants returned to the village in 1772. During the 19th century Upper and Lower Nyék were differentiated, even after 1861, when the Southern Railway was built. It is mentioned as an independent village first in 1871, to which Pettend was attached in 1898.

Mihály Vörösmarty (1800–1855), the famous Hungarian poet was born here, and the house where he grew up is dedicated to him as a museum.

The present appearance of the village was formed in the 1930s, when it became a commercial and service background for the booming tourism of the Lake Velencei. The phone system, the gendarme patrol, local medical care, the railway station and the mill were established in this period. The settlement suffered serious damage in World War II, when the majority of the population also died. The village also lagged behind in development, compared to other settlements of the region and became a part of Velence by the 1970s.

Kápolnásnyék declared its independence in 1990 and has gone through considerable development since then. It once again became the background for the tourism of Lake Velencei, where commercial service facilities are established and the infrastructure is developing rapidly.
