= Enying =

Town in Fejér, Hungary

- Town
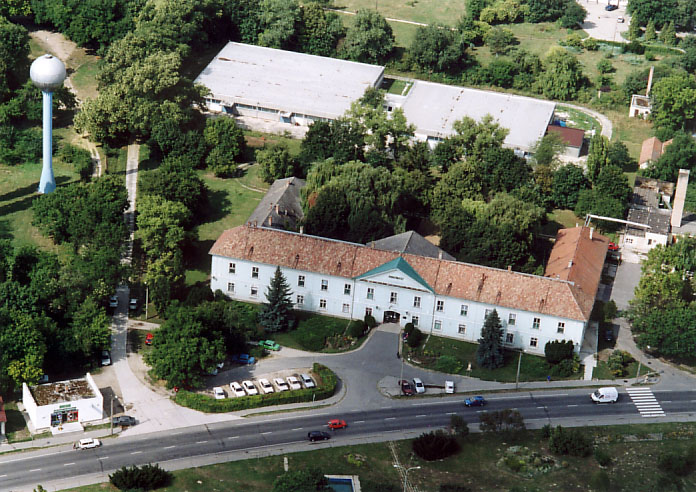
- Enying, palace

- Flag Coat of arms

- Location of Enying
- Coordinates: 46.92958°N 18.24297°E
- Country: Hungary
- County: Fejér
- District: Enying

Area
  - Total: 82.78 km^{2} (31.96 sq mi)

Population (2008)
  - Total: 7,035
  - Density: 86.57/km^{2} (224.2/sq mi)
- Time zone: UTC+1 (CET)
  - Summer (DST): UTC+2 (CEST)
- Postal code: 8130
- Area code: (+36) 22
- Website: www.enying.eu

Enying (Hungarian pronunciation: [ˈɛɲiŋɡ]) is a town in Fejér county, Hungary. The Olympian Géza Mészöly was born here.

== Twin towns – sister cities ==
Enying is twinned with:

- Bad Urach, Germany
- Huedin, Romania
- Świerklany, Poland
- Yukamenskoye, Russia
