= Zichyújfalu =

Zichyújfalu Villa Nova (in Latin)
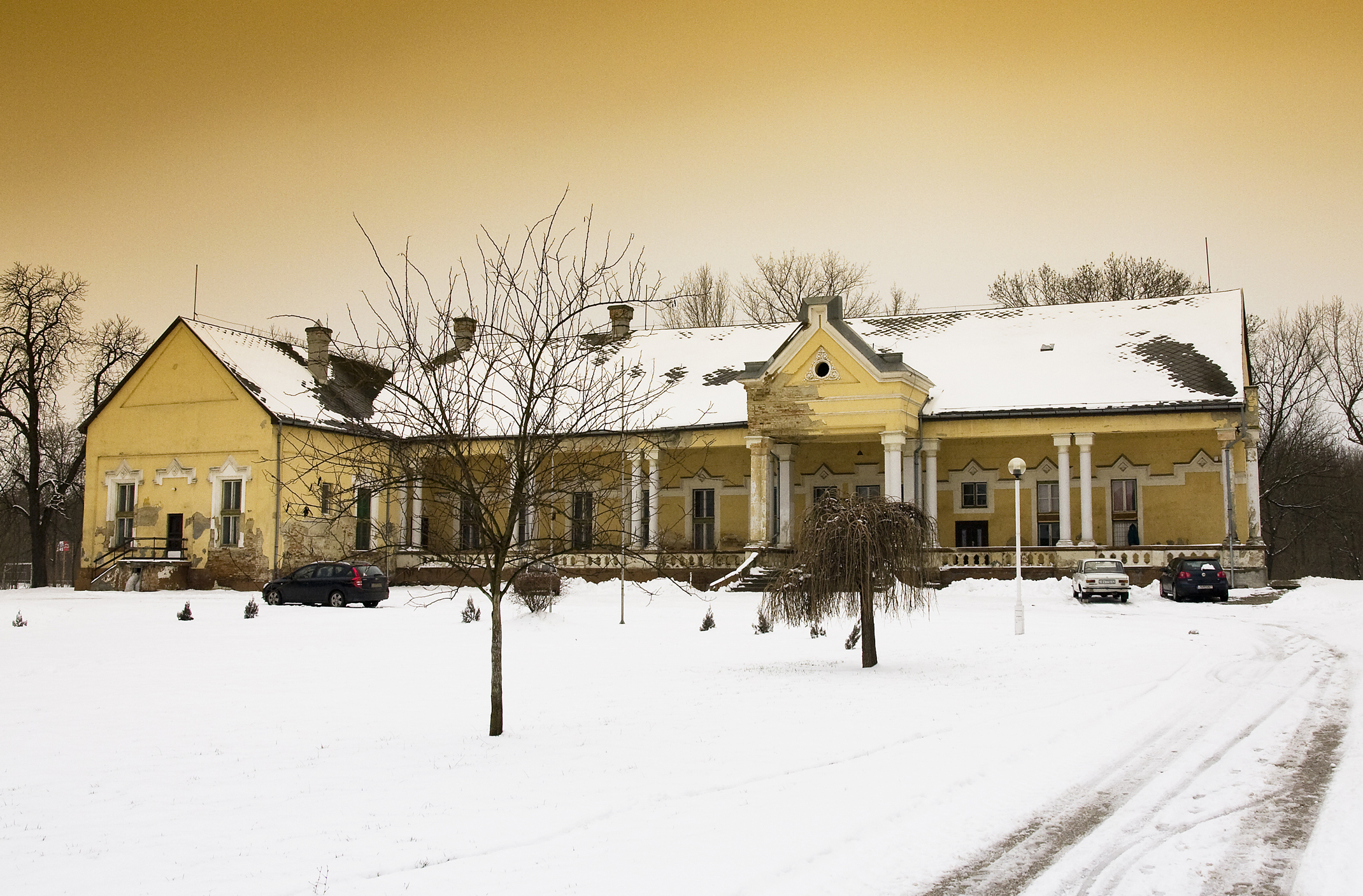
- Zichy Mansion

- Coat of arms

- Location of Fejér county in Hungary

- Location of Zichyújfalu
- Coordinates: 47.129715°N 18.67216°E
- Country: Hungary
- County: Fejér

Government
  - Mayor: Ilona Füzesiné Kolonics

Area
  - Total: 10.82 km^{2} (4.18 sq mi)
- Elevation: 125 m (410 ft)

Population (2014)
  - Total: 909
  - Density: 84.011/km^{2} (217.59/sq mi)
- Time zone: UTC+1 (CET)
  - Summer (DST): UTC+2 (CEST)
- Postal code: 8112
- Area code: 22

Zichyújfalu is a village in Fejér county, Hungary, about 10 km from Lake Velencei, which is more or less easy to reach on road and on railway (Pusztaszabolcs-Székesfehérvár line). The settlement used to be a part of Gárdony but declared its independence in December 1997.

The settlement is first mentioned in writing in 1239, when villa Nowa (Nova) belonged to the Vértes estates of the Csák clan. In 1447 it is mentioned as a noble name as Wyfalw (Újfalu).

The Family Zichy appeared as the landlord in Újfalu during Turkish occupation. After the Turkish rule the serfs of Seregélyes rented the land for some time. In 1784 the owner of the estate, János Zichy, the son of Ferenc Zichy had a castle built in Újfalu and established a deer-park.

The phrase Zichy in the name of the settlement refers to these earlier landlords, the members of the Zichy family. The hunting residence of de count is also in the village; currently the Mayor's Office functions in this building, therefore the building can only be observed from outside. The park and the forest of the castle offer active relaxation.

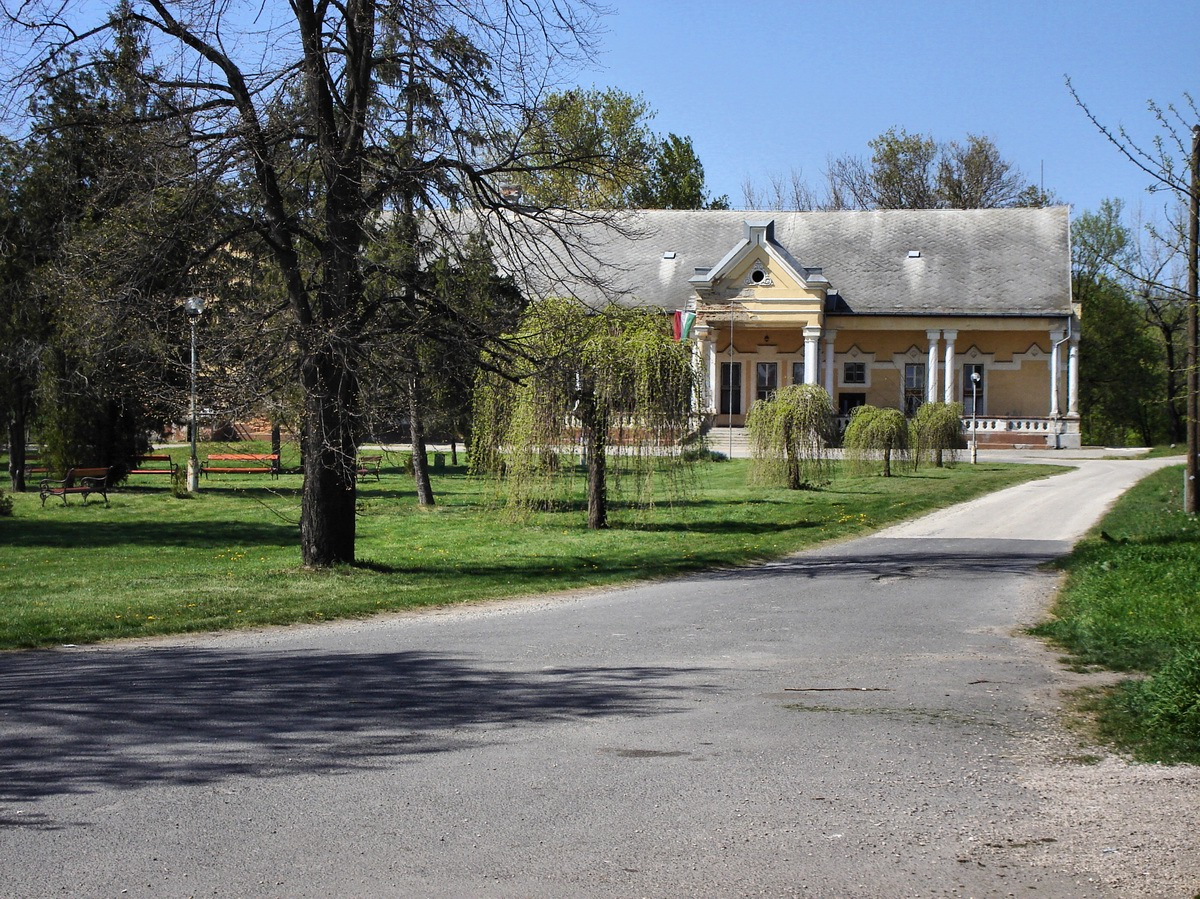
Castle park

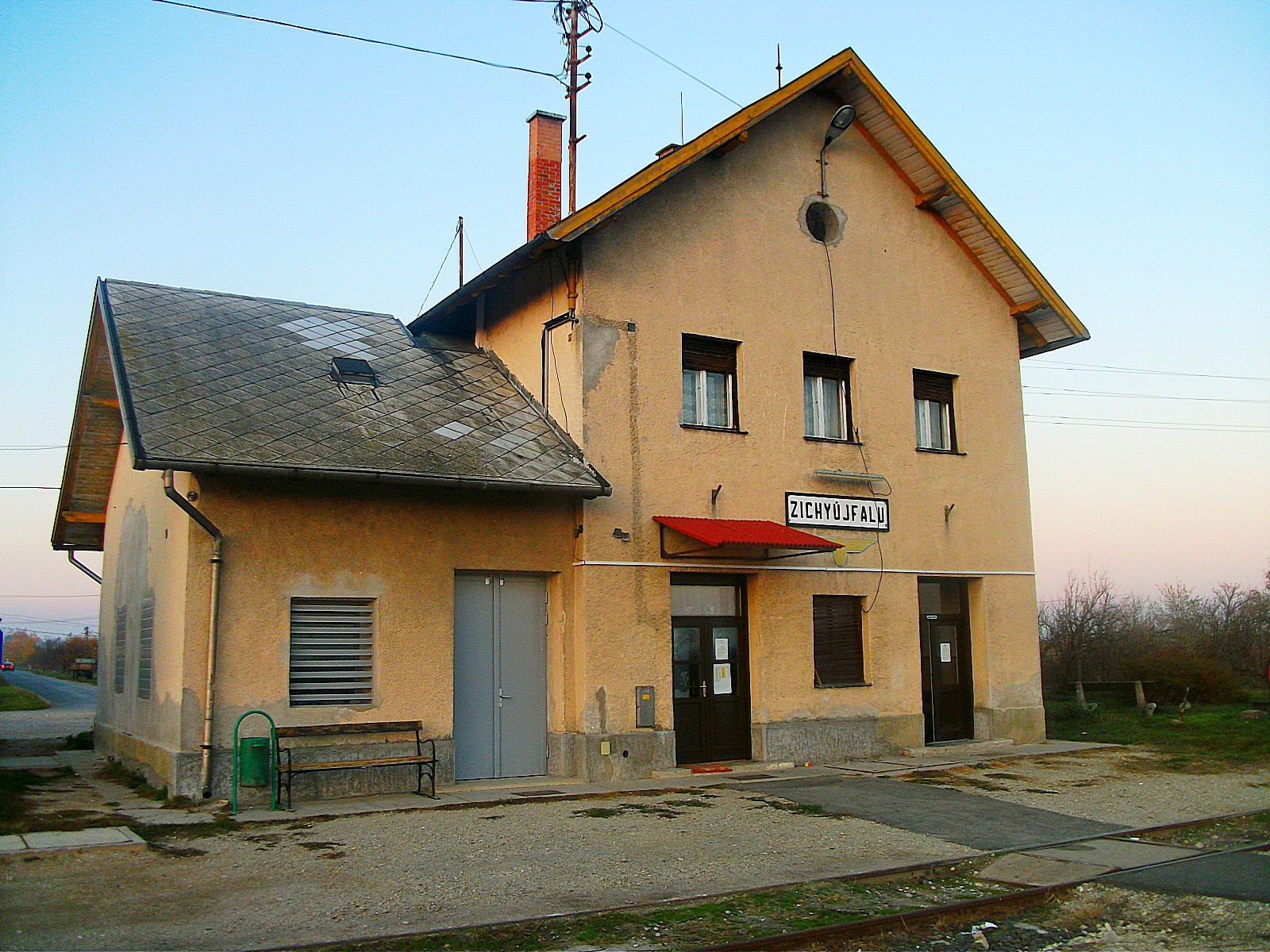
Railway

== Demographics ==
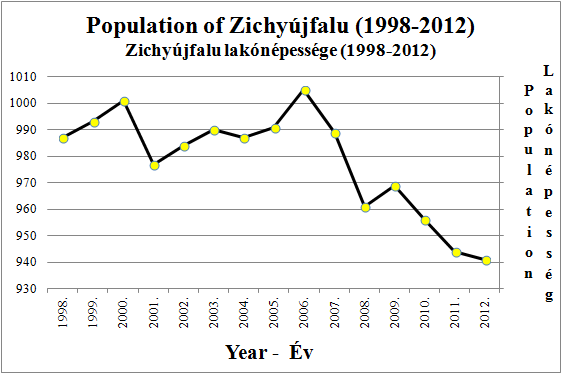
Population of Zichyújfalu (between 1998 and 2012)

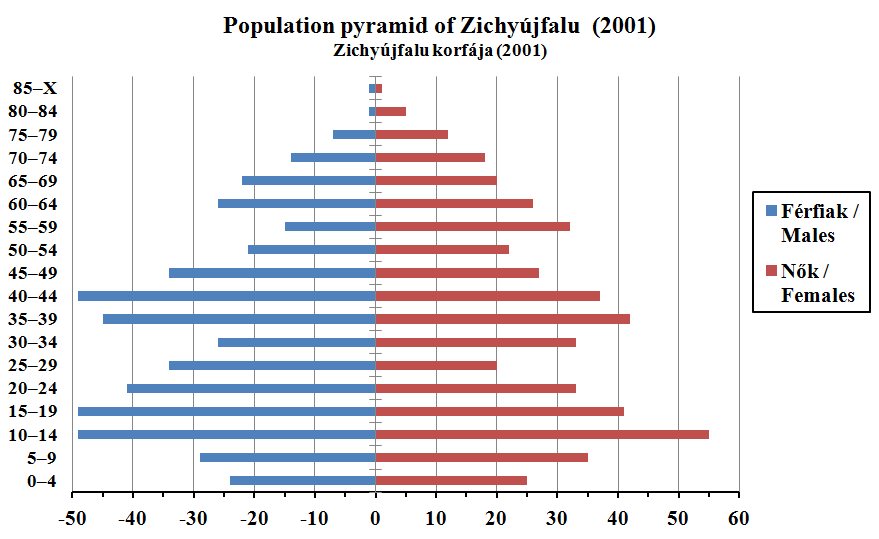
Population pyramid of Zichyújfalu, 2001

== History ==
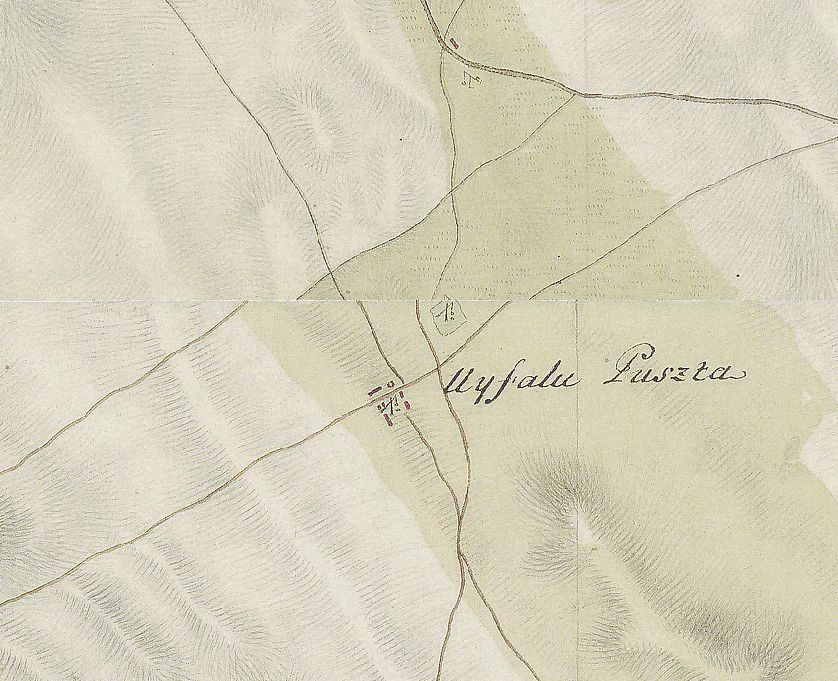
The map of Zichyújfalu from the First Military Mapping Survey of Austria Empire.

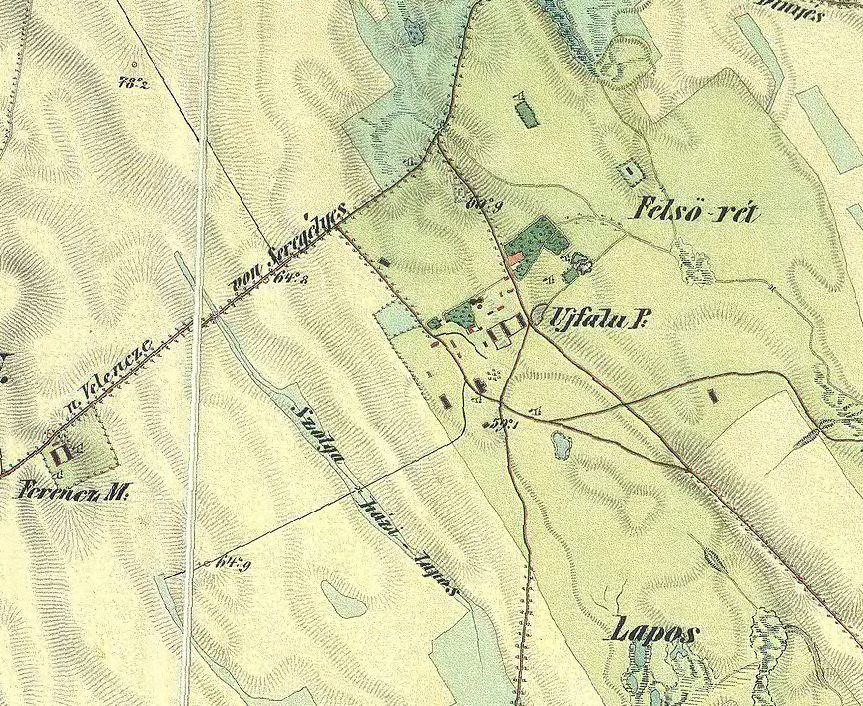
The map of Zichyújfalu from the Second Military Mapping Survey of Austria Empire.

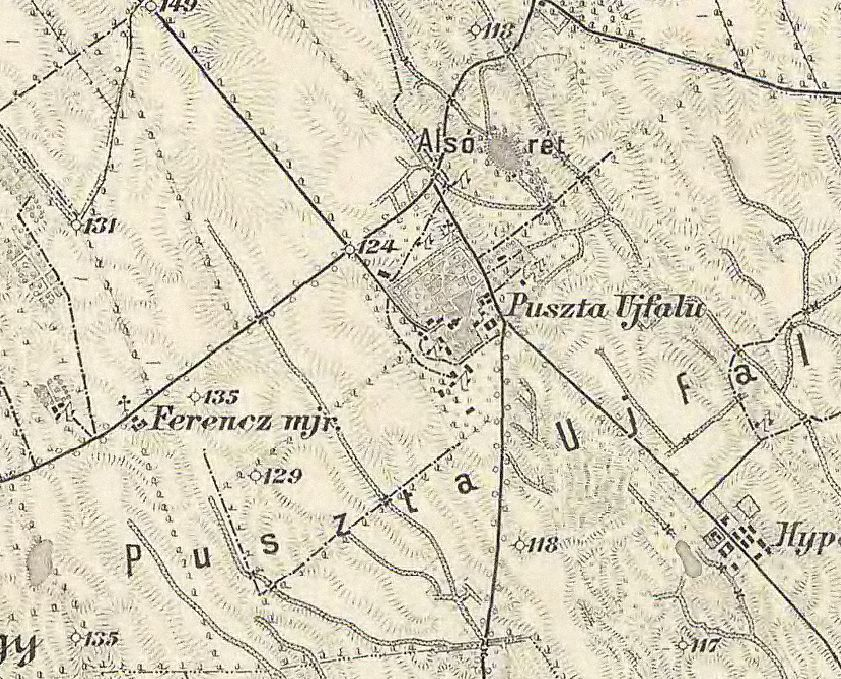
The map of Zichyújfalu from 3rd Military Mapping Survey of Austria-Hungary.

The name Újfalu denotes a newly founded settlement. The distinctive anterior constituent of the settlement's name, the word 'Zichy' is a reference to the one-time landowners of the area, the members of the Zichy family. The first written mention of the settlement's name goes back to 1239, when Villa Nowa (Nova) was part of the Vértes estate of the Csák clan. In 1447 the name of the settlement appeared as Wyfalw (Újfalu), a nobiliary forename.

The members of the Zichy family became the local landowners as early as the period of the Turkish Conquest. The Hungarian landowners in this period lived in Győr and the Turkish ones in Székesfehérvár. After the expulsion of the Turks the area was leased to the villeins of Seregélyes, who, in 1717 requested the renewal of the leasing contract because they could not make a living from their lands The boundaries of Újfalupuszta and the neighbouring estates were fixed in 1745.

In 1784 Ferenc Zichy became the landowner of the farmstead. In this period it consisted of six houses, in which 18 families, a total of 91 people lived. Újfalupuszta was affiliated to the chapter of Seregélyes. The census of 1786/87 mentioned 61 local inhabitants.

In the middle of the 19th century Újfalupuszta (called Zichyújfalu from 1898 onward) was characterised by feudal backwardness. Development was blocked by the existence of the feudal estate and no improvement occurred until capitalism began to develop. Progress was dependent on the development of the estate and due to this fact it was very slow. The inhabitants of Újfalu were also dependent on the estate for their living and they were mostly household servants and daily workers. There were no villeins in the settlement, which meant that there were no peasant movements either.

The number of inhabitants depended on the demand of the labour market. Újfalu in this period was administered from Seregélyes. The landowner also lived at Seregélyes, and he was also the owner of several other farmsteads in the vicinity of the market town. The area of the Újfalu farmstead was 2721 acres, out of which 2100 acres were ploughland, 417 acres meadow and 204 acres pasture. The Újfalu estate had no swamps, orchards, vineyards or large wooded areas.

It was the members of the Zichy family who launched the capitalistic development of their estate in the middle of the 1870s. They recognised the outstanding potentials of their land and utilised these qualities. The land was extremely fertile and yielded good crop. Corn production and animal husbandry were the most significant occupations in the area. Payment at Újfalu did not differ from payments labourers received elsewhere for agricultural work. Agricultural workers were most often paid in kind. The members of the Zichy family achieved outstanding economic results at the end of the 19th century. Their income on the other hand did not contribute to the social and economic rise of the estate workers. The majority of agricultural workers in this period was from Seregélyes and because of this their revolts always coincided with those ones at Seregélyes. The agrarian movements were common in the area from 1897 to 1906.

The landowners spent their income on their own good. János Zichy had a mansion built at Újfalu and established a menagerie. As a shareholder he took part in the construction works of the Székesfehérvár-Pusztaszabolcs railway line. He also planned to build a post office at Újfalu.

Cultural life in these circumstances was under the influence of the church. The majority of Újfalu's population was Roman Catholic with Calvinists in minority. Both religious congregations were administered from Seregélyes until as late as 1949. The school was run by the Roman Catholics, but the children of Calvinist families were also allowed to attend it. In the 1870s János Zichy donated an annual sum of 400 forints for school maintenance. When this support was withdrawn by him, the school ceased to operate in the village. Following this there was no permanent village school at Újfalu for two and a half decades.

The establishment of a loading platform at the railway station of Újfalu and the construction of a narrow-gauge railway line made the selling of agricultural products easy and the production intensive. Around 1900 the capital became the main market for the agricultural products grown at Újfalu.

During the war János Zichy leased his estate to tenants. In the last war month, in October 1918 there was a good deal of tension felt among the inhabitants of the settlement. In the first weeks of the Soviet republic of 1919 the farmstead became an independent cooperative. From the mid-20s onward Zichy once again leased his property to tenants.

The area got in the centre of 2nd world war military activities from 1944 onward and the fights lasted until the end of the war. The population was evacuated and the armed struggles came to an end only on 21 March 1945.

In the spring of 1946 the idea of becoming independent was raised in the village, but it was opposed by the authorities at Seregélyes as well as by the county administrators.

Local inhabitants found employment on the state farm. The leaders of the farm were able and willing to support the settlement financially as well. Permanent workers were settled down in the village, and, as a result, the number of local inhabitants began to grow. New settlers were given not only job opportunities but also housing and building sites. Large-scale construction began.

Due to the rise of population figures local affairs could no longer be directed from Seregélyes, another settlement of the area. The establishment of a local office of administration did not improve the situation either. In the mid-1950s local economy was so strong that it could take its share from public duties. The problems of education were also about to be solved A new school building was erected in the village from 1957 to 1959 and it has been functioning as a school up to now. The electrification of the settlement failed in 1948, but in 1956 Újfalu was linked to the national network.

The number of inhabitants was continuously on the rise and because of this the question of administrative changes had to be raised in this period. About 80% of the village population was employed by the State Farm of Agárd. Agárd, as well as Gárdony had a tremendous influence on life at Újfalu. The participants of the Village Assembly on 14 September 1962 voted for the unification of Gárdony and Újfalu. From the originally 2434-acre area of Újfalu 1689 acres were annexed to Gárdony.

After unification the settlement underwent a period of development. Several streets were established and paved in the village, sidewalks were also paved. The inhabitants also participated in the programme of development and they did a lot of voluntary work. Shopping facilities also improved. Village shops were formerly run by the agricultural cooperative of Seregélyes, and now they were taken over by the local ÁFÉSZ (cooperative). The road leading from the railway station to Csirib major was paved and a regular bus service was operated between Újfalu and Gárdony, the administrative centre. In the 1970s the local inhabitants began to leave the settlement. This was a steady process and giving out new building sites did not improve the situation.

In the period after the changing of the political system this tendency slowed down, since it became increasingly difficult for people to find jobs in the industrial plants nearby.

Transport was also increasingly problematic and the inhabitants had difficulties in reaching the administrative centre or the mayor's office. Local inhabitants were increasingly confined to the area of Zichyújfalu. This is why they were more and more aware of the fact that the joint local government of Gárdony and Zichyújfalu did not pay enough attention to the well-being of Zichyújfalu and did not spend enough money on them. No capital was invested in this part of the settlement and no new projects were initiated. The opinion of the local inhabitants was that they could benefit from a new local government, the representatives of which would consider Zichyújfalu's needs.

In addition to these changes the economic preconditions for becoming independent were also present in the village. Considering the settlement's real needs and interests the inhabitants of Zichyújfalu decided to secure an independent status for their settlement.

Zichyújfalu was granted an independent status on 15 December 1997.

== Landmarks ==
=== Zichy Mansion ===
Zichy family mansion in 1784 raised Zichyújfalu. It was called the Little Castle, which became the farm manager's apartment after the construction of a large mansion. The palace Zichy John Nepomuk was built between 1891 and 1894 in eclectic style. He once was a U-shaped building, but the right wing of the II. World War II was destroyed. It used to be surrounded by 28 acres of parkland. In front of the main facade is based on 14 double-column porch that runs along the center based on two pillars, culminating episode comes out.

== Education ==
The István Fekete Primary School the community's elementary school has carried the name of the writer István Fekete since 1992. The school is provided for by the Velence Lake Multipurpose Kistréségi Society. The school is a member of the Agárd Chernel István Elementary School, High School, Dormitory, and Basic Educational Institutions.

== Gallery ==
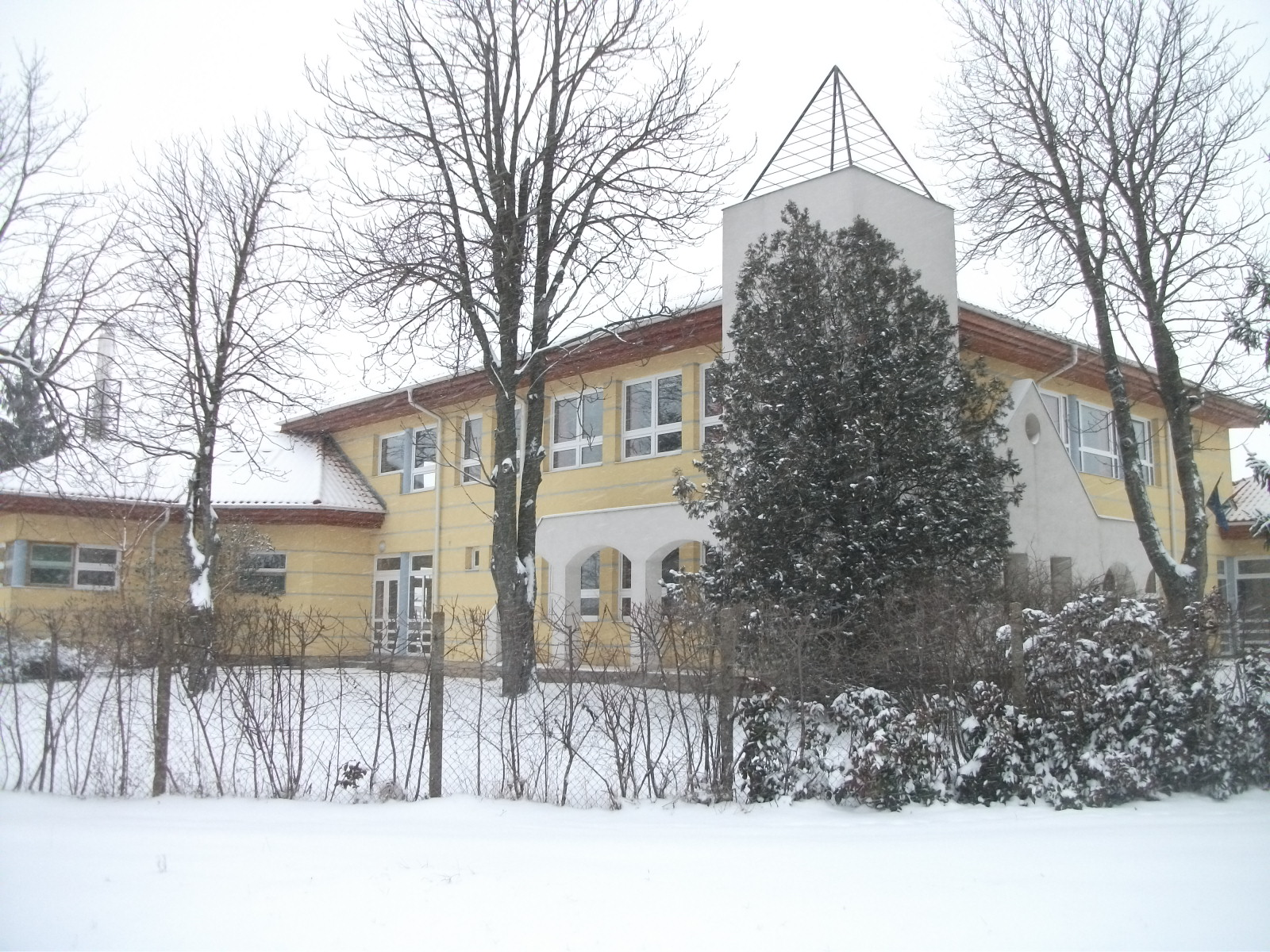
István Fekete Primary School

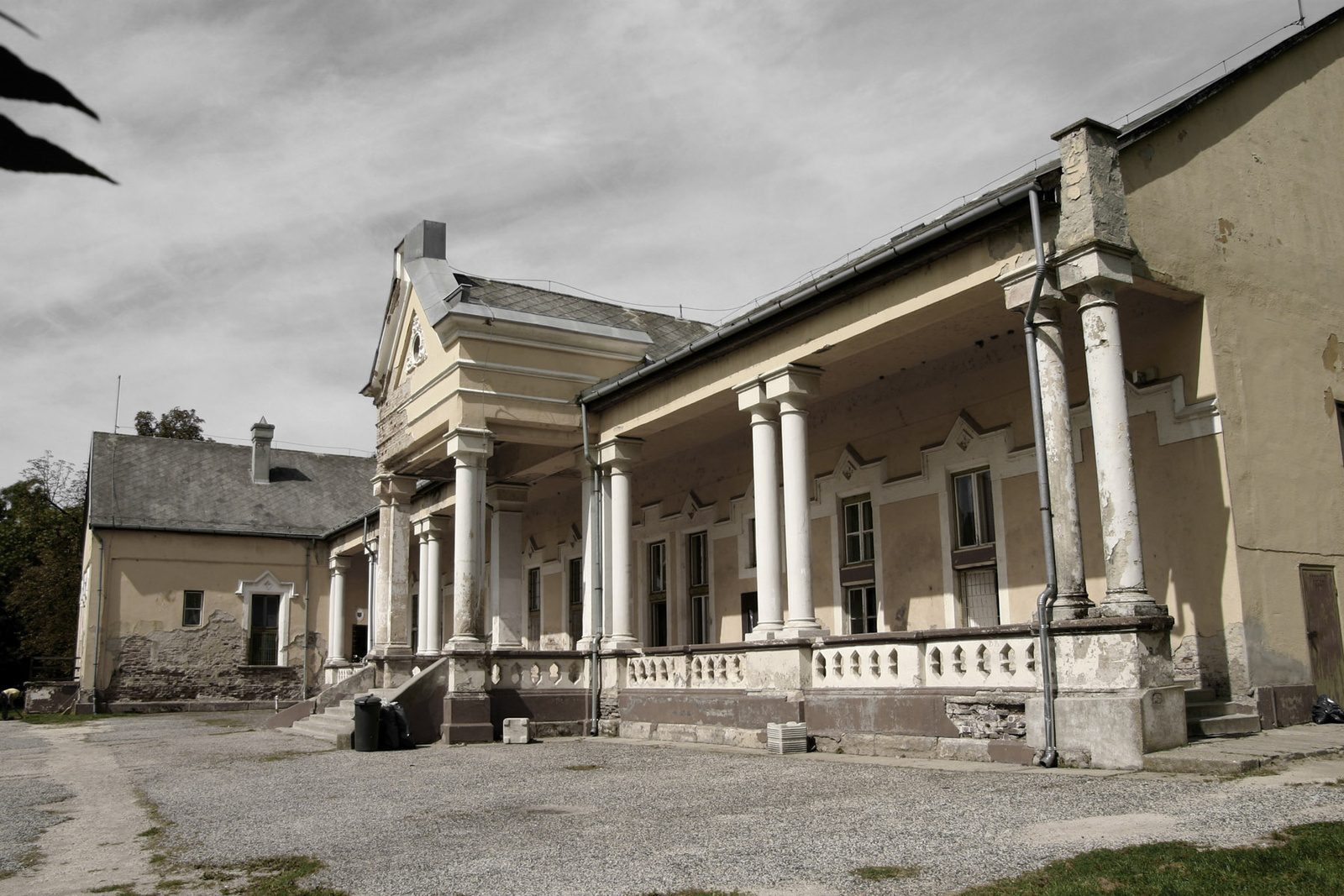
Zichy Mansion

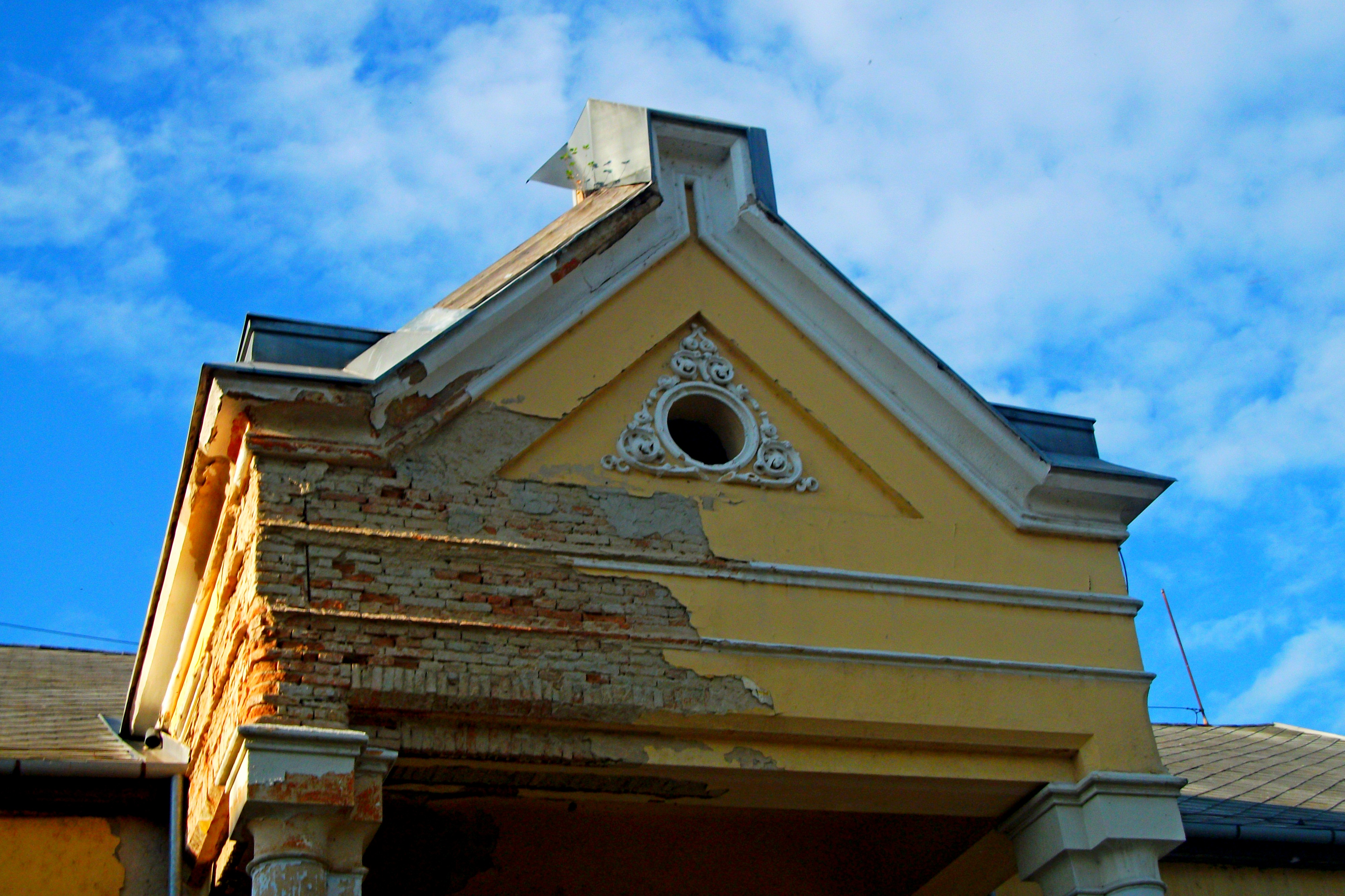
Zichy Mansion facade

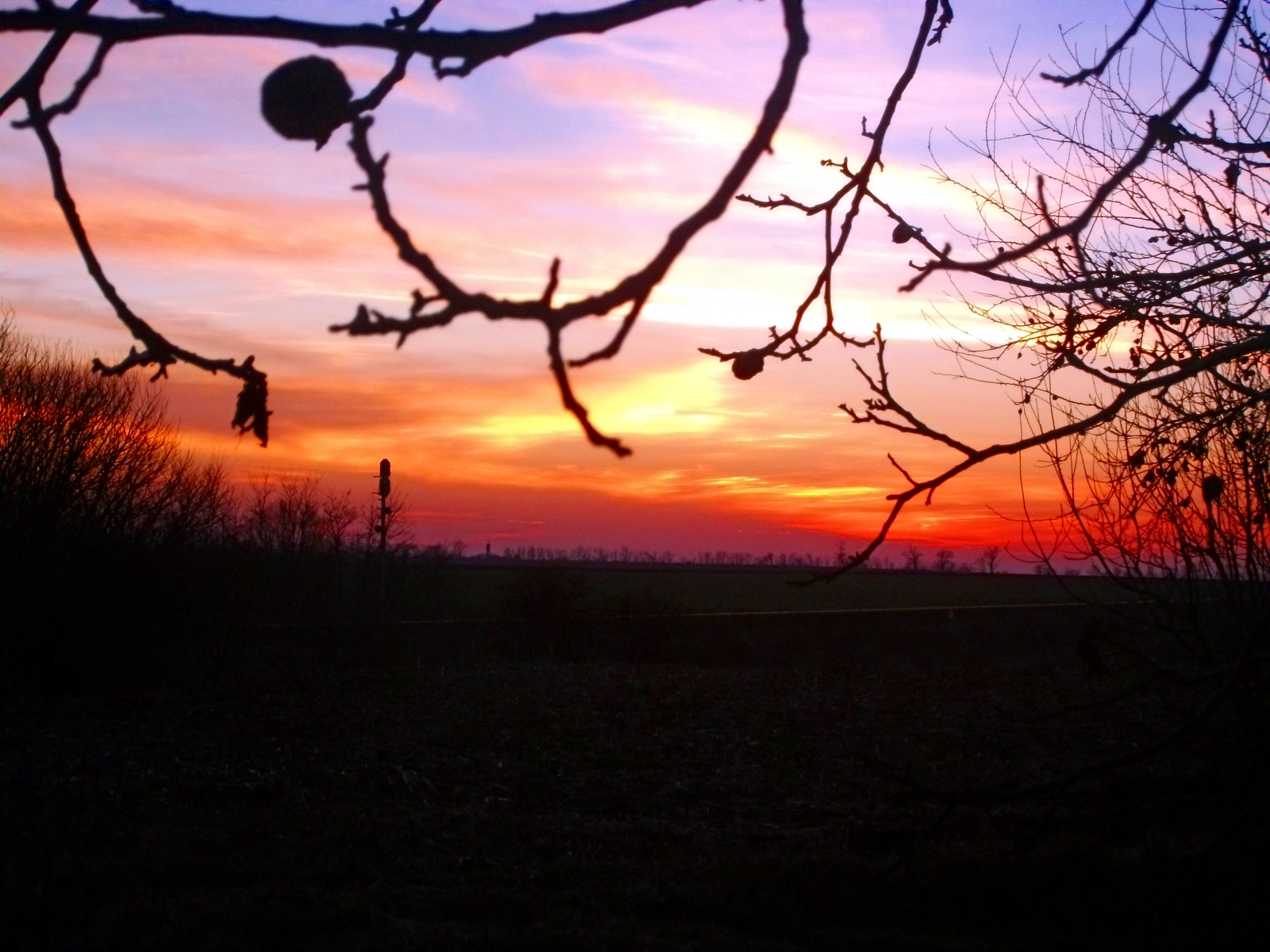
Sunset near Zichyújfalu

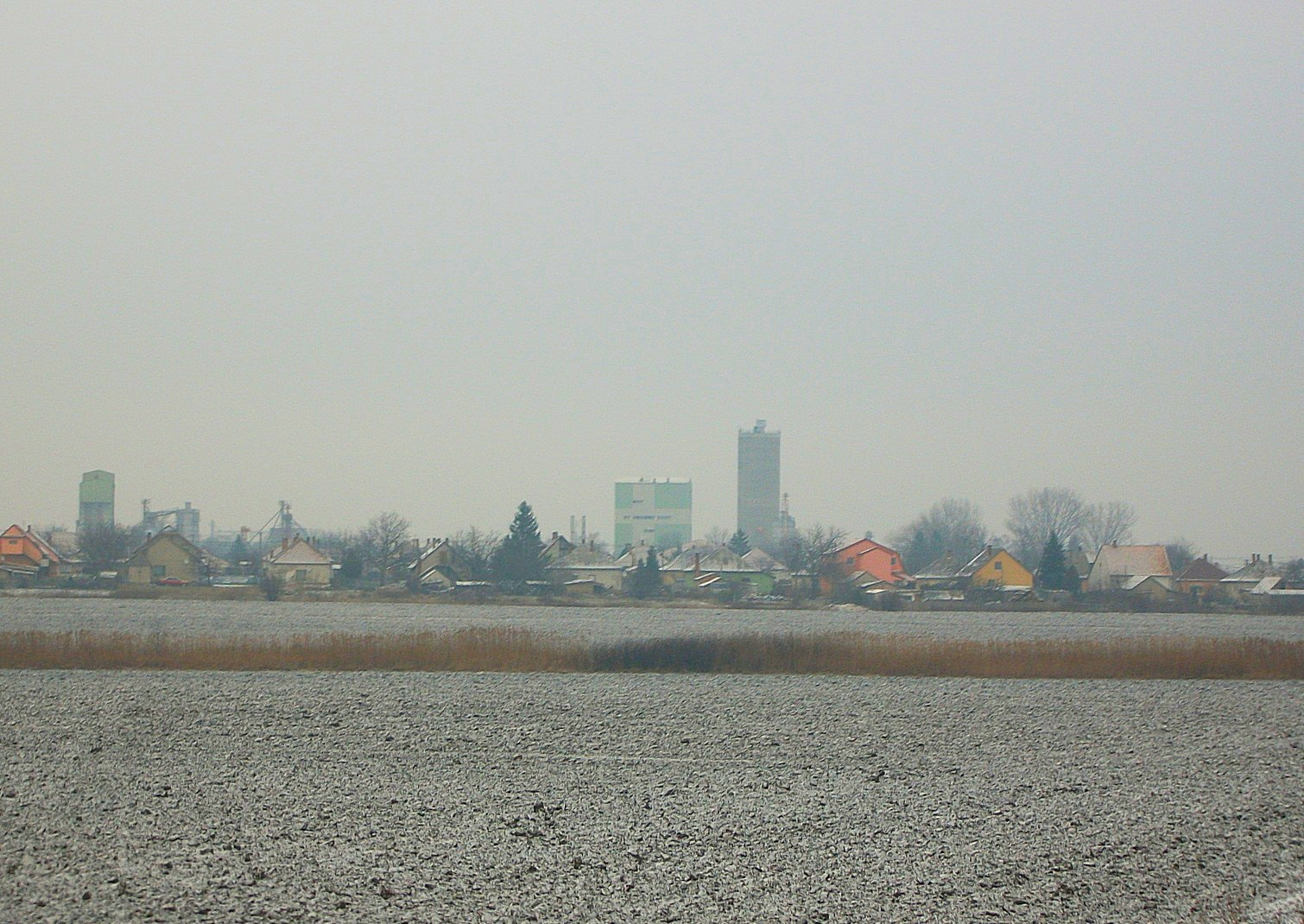

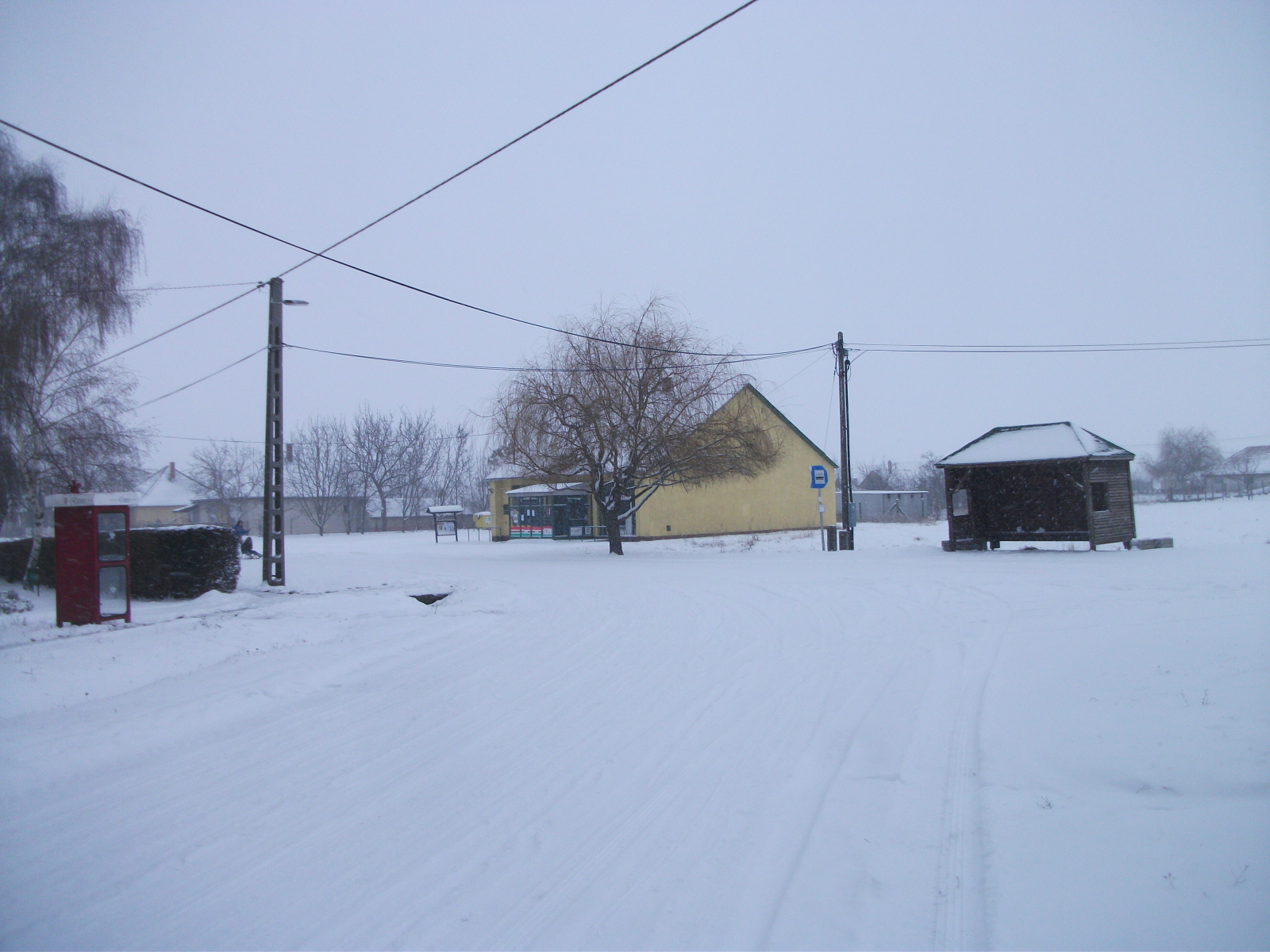

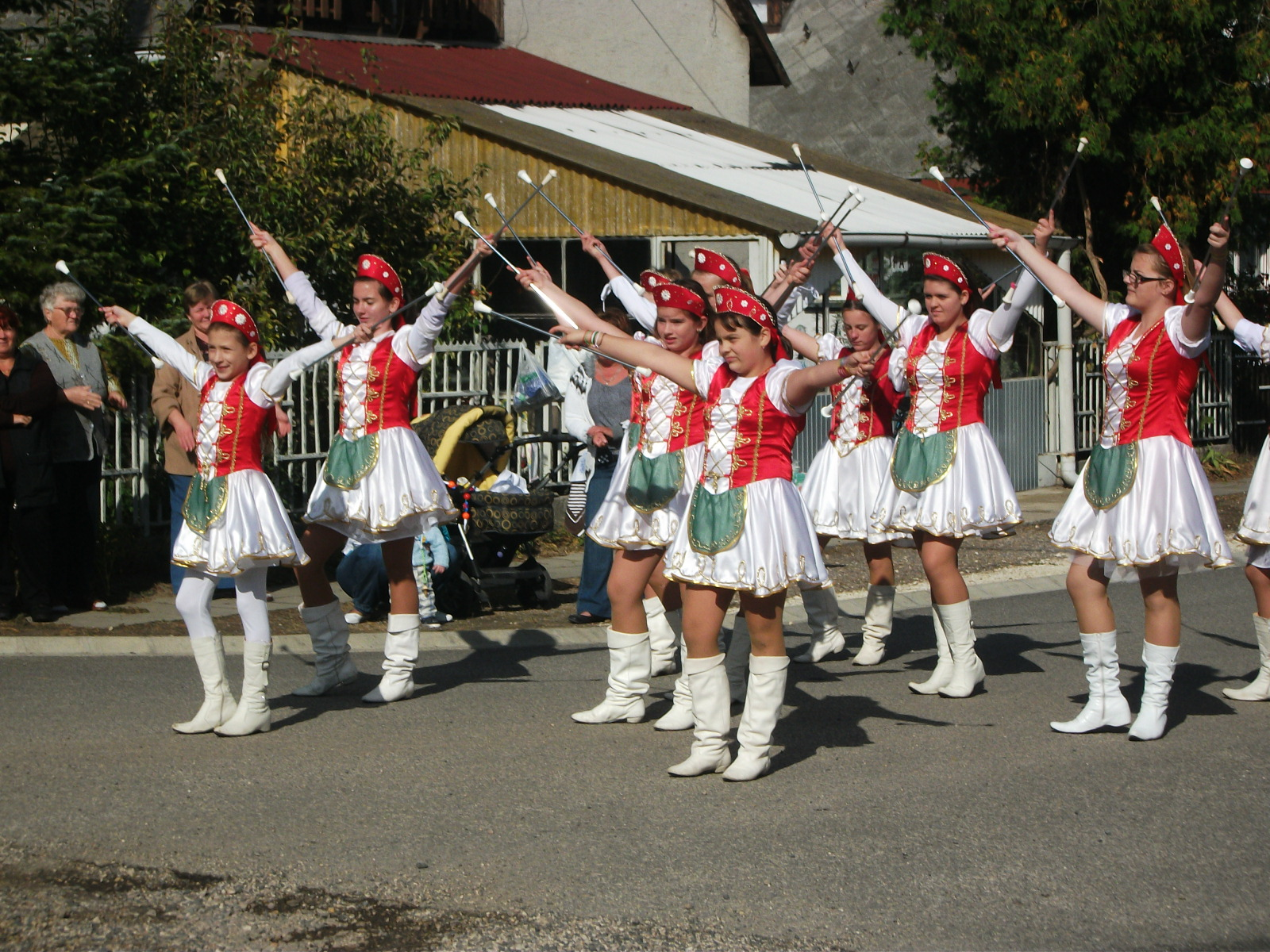
Majorette dancers in Zichyújfalu

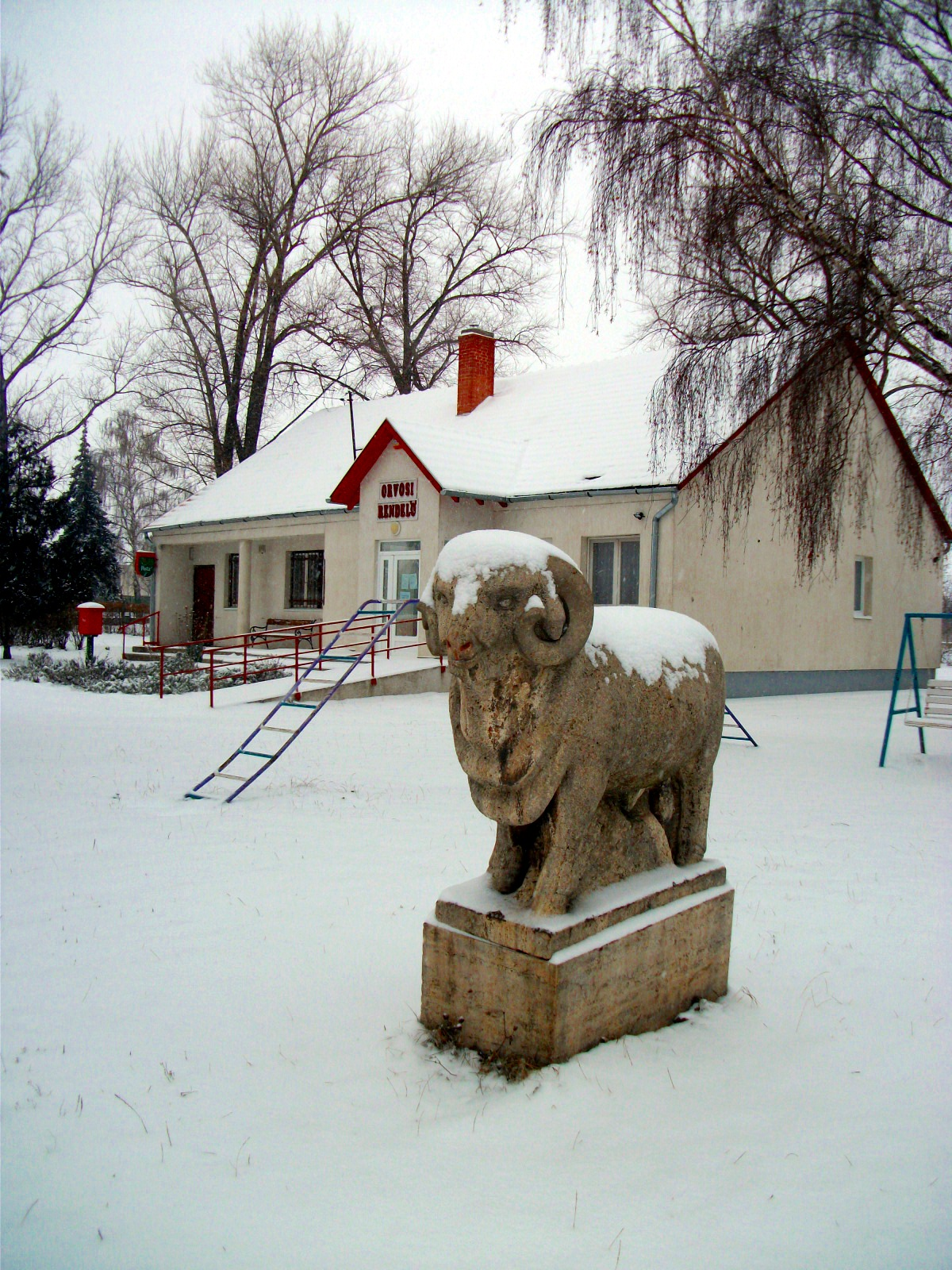
Sheep statue

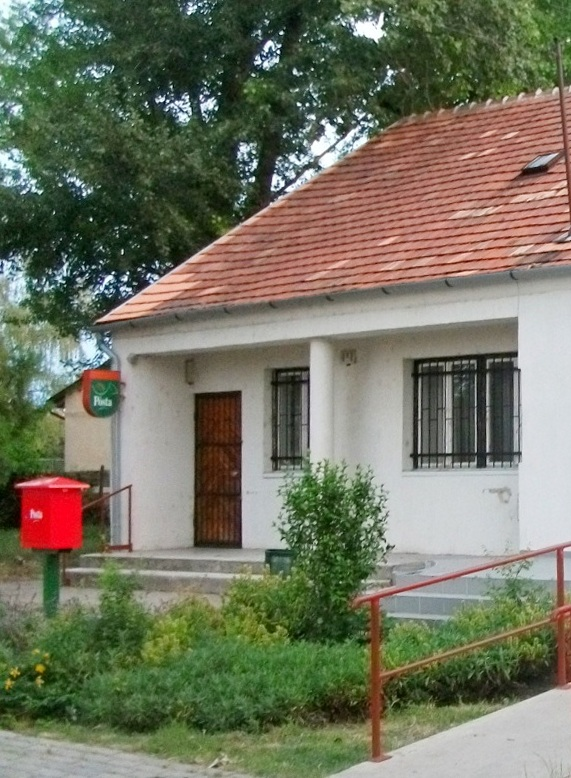
Magyar Posta

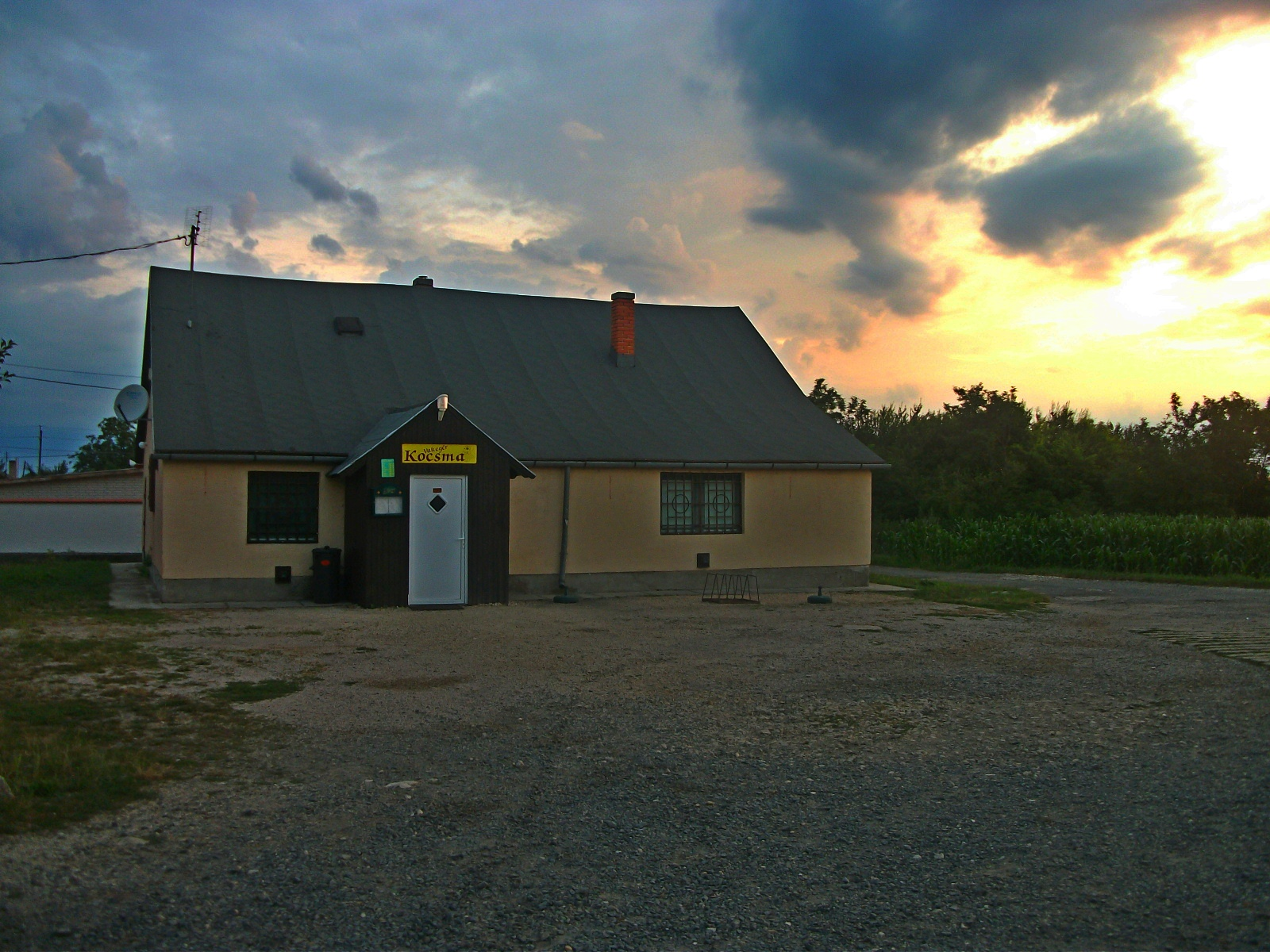
Vakegér pub

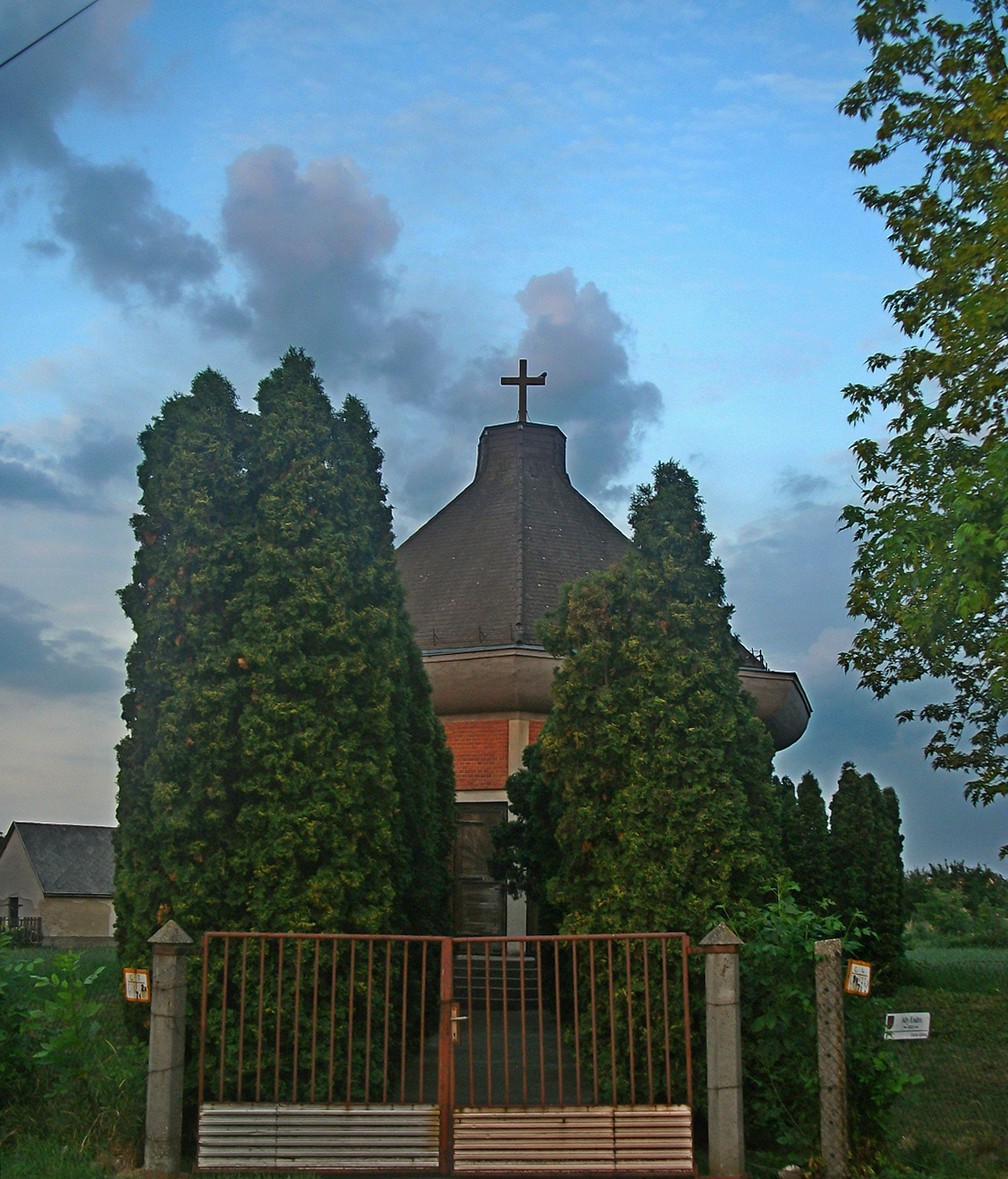
Saint Emeric chapel

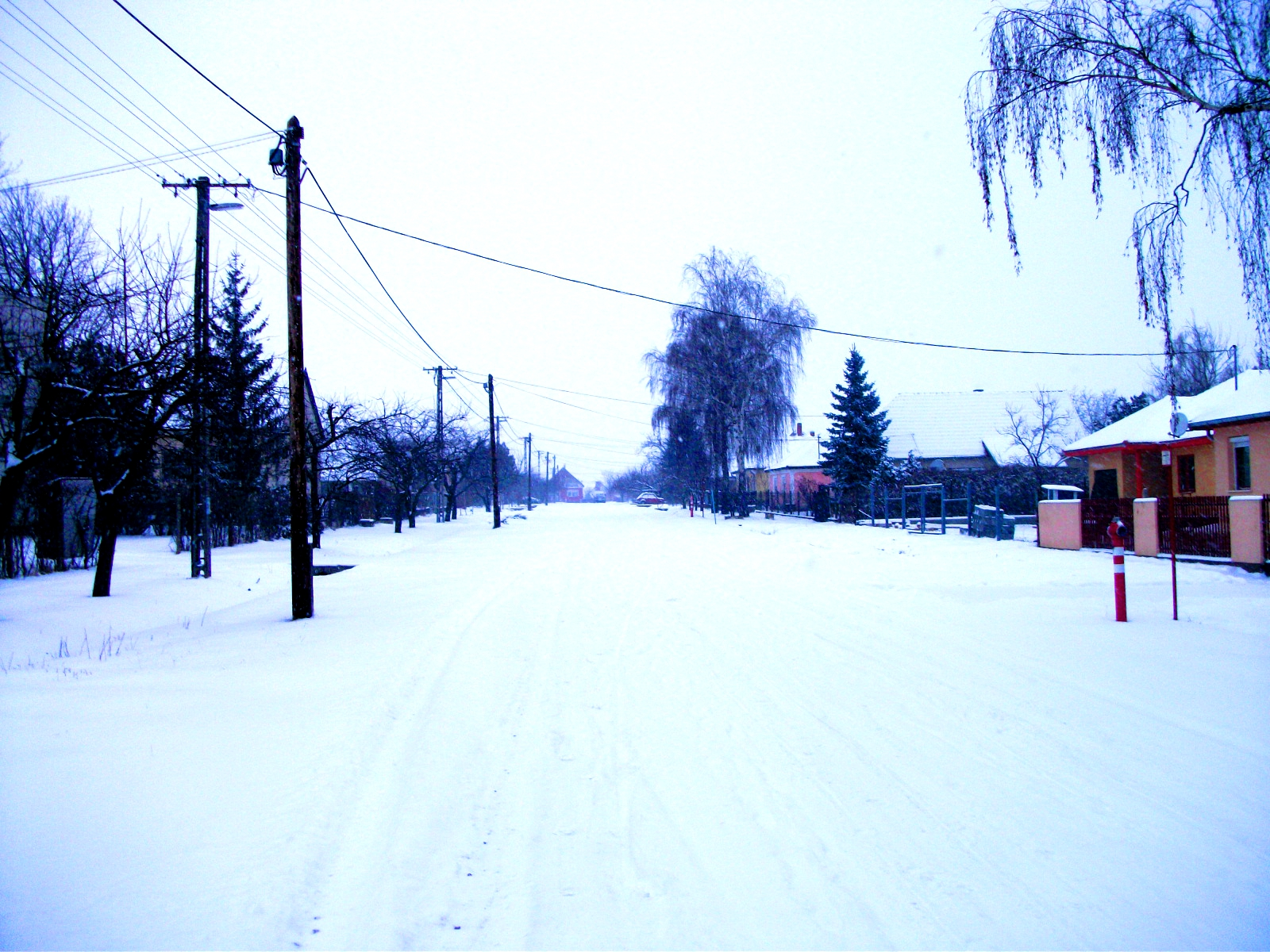
Iskola street

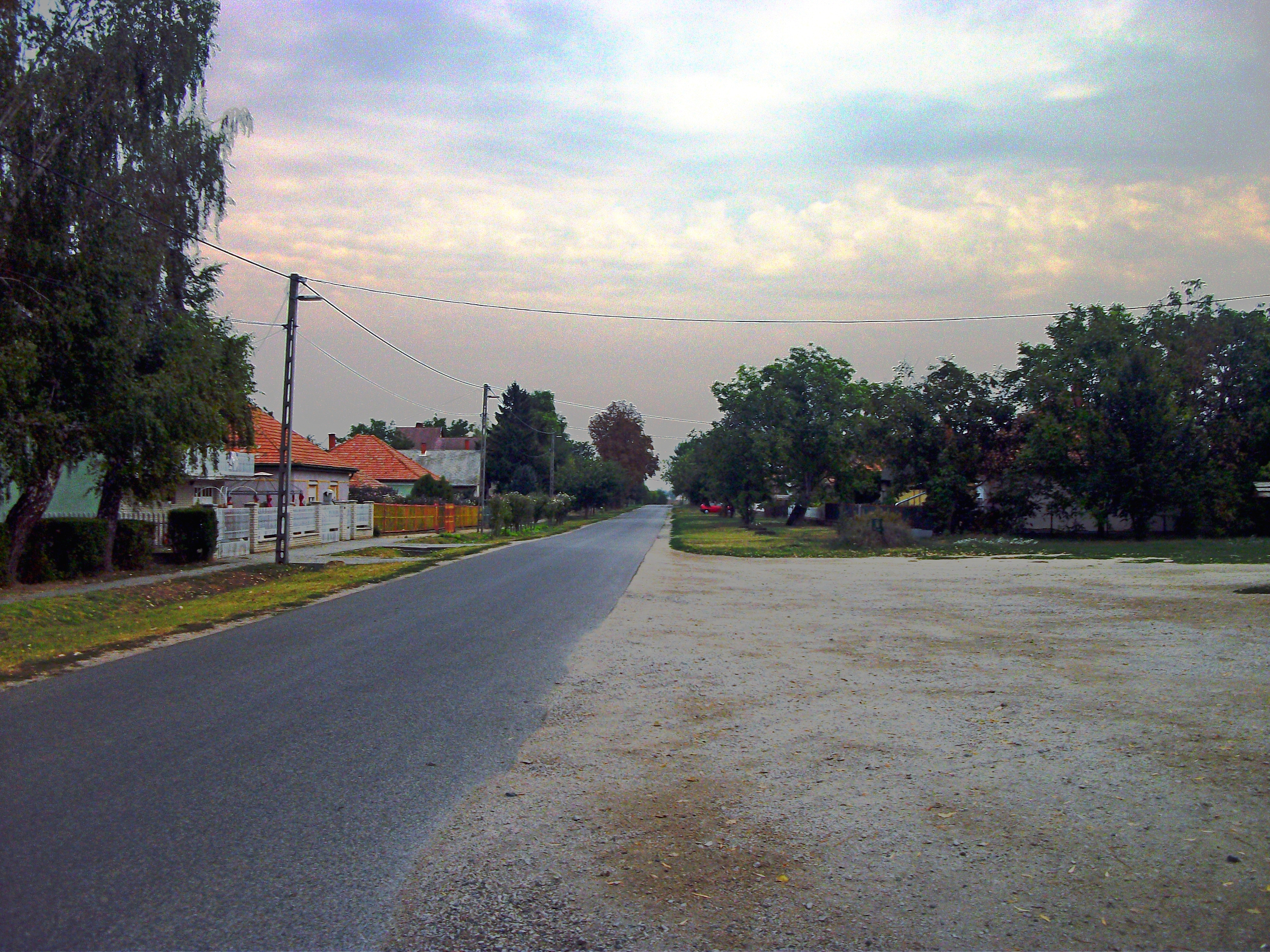
Ady Endre street

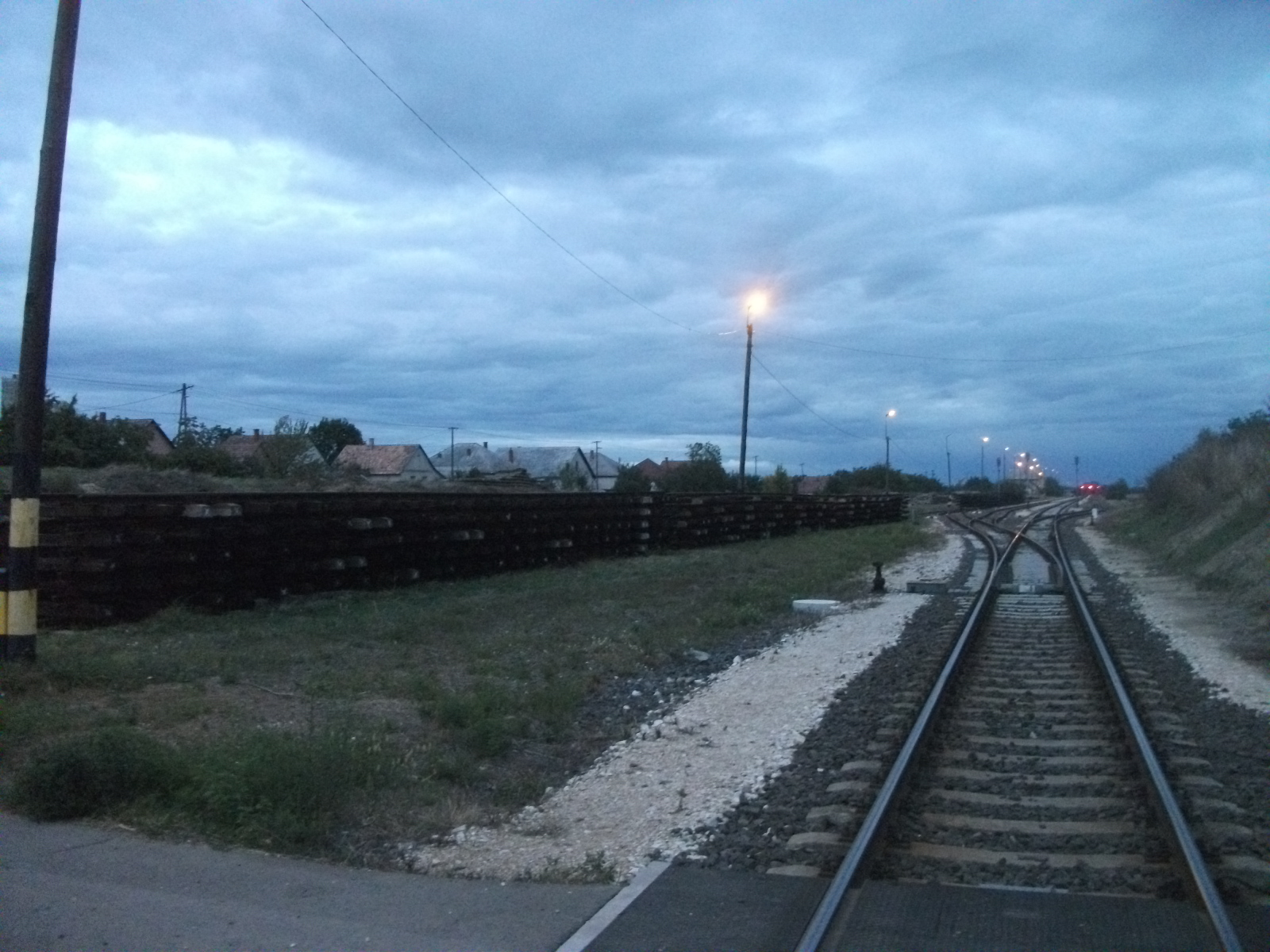
Railway line

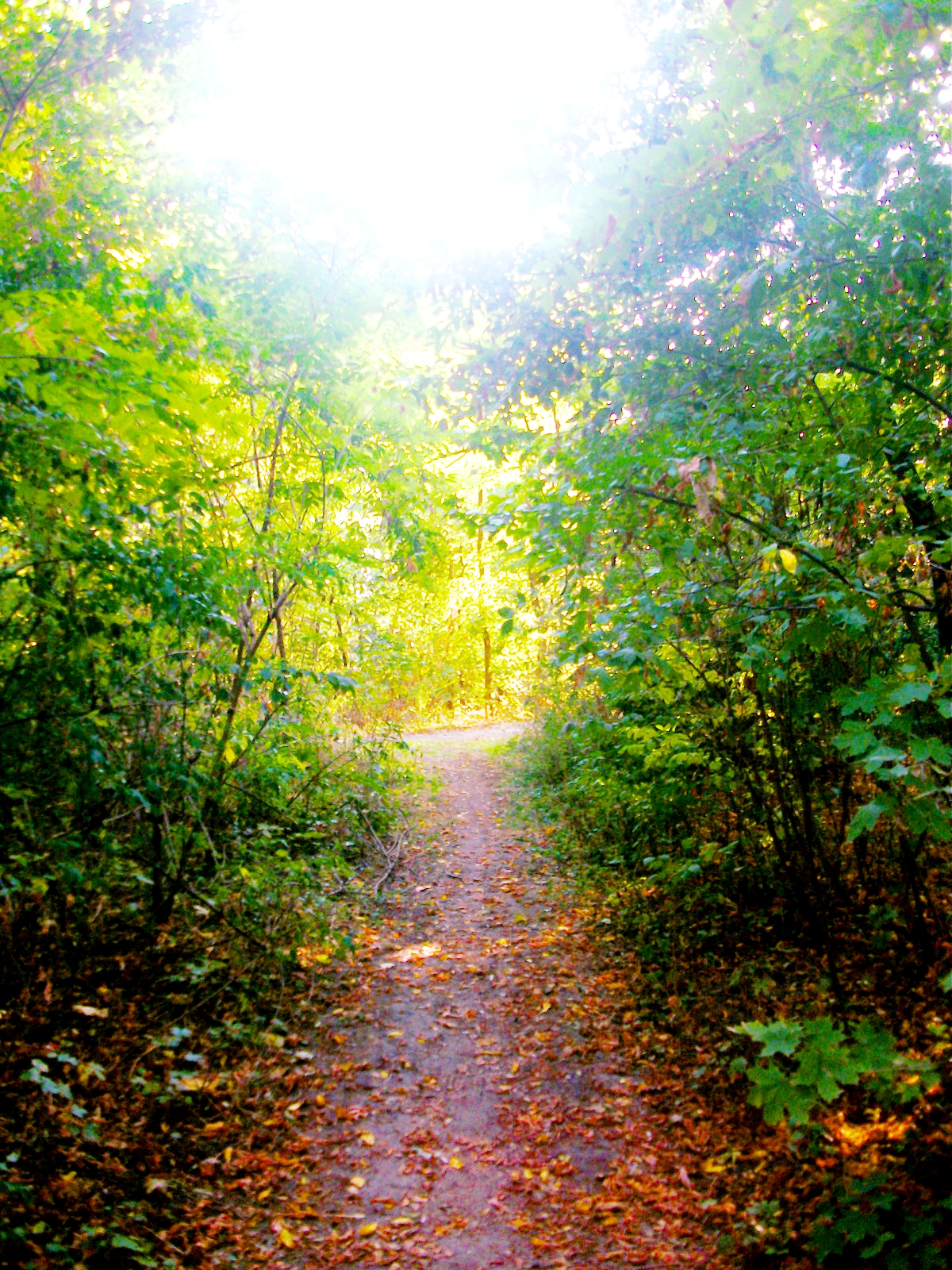
Forest in Zichyújfalu
