= Sárszentmihály =

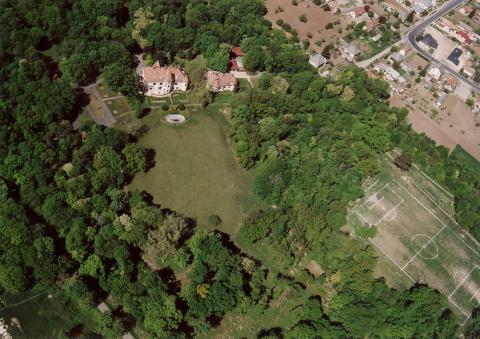

- Coat of arms

- Location of Fejér county in Hungary

- Location of Sárszentmihály
- Coordinates: 47.15552°N 18.32317°E
- Country: Hungary
- County: Fejér

Area
  - Total: 37.4 km^{2} (14.4 sq mi)

Population (2004)
  - Total: 2,917
  - Density: 77.99/km^{2} (202.0/sq mi)
- Time zone: UTC+1 (CET)
  - Summer (DST): UTC+2 (CEST)
- Postal code: 8143
- Area code: 22

Sárszentmihály is a village in Fejér county, Hungary.
