= Jakab Fellner =

Moravian-born Hungarian architect (1722-1780)

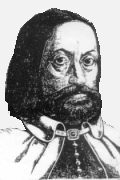
- Born: July 25, 1722; Nikolsburg, Moravia
- Died: December 12, 1780 (aged 58); Tata, Hungary
- Occupation: Architect

Jakab Fellner (Fellenthali Fellner Jakab; 25 July 1722 – 12 December 1780) was the most important Baroque architect of his generation in Hungary.

Fellner was born in Moravia. Although untrained, his skills and knowledge, gained through experience, made him one of the most sought after architects of his day. In 1745 he settled in Tata, where he lived almost uninterrupted until his death. He played a major role in the development of towns in the area such as Pápa, Eger and Veszprém. Initially working for the Esterhazy family, his growing reputation led to commissions from many others. His first major work was the Roman Catholic Tata Parish Church, which was initially built according to the plans of Franz Anton Pilgram in 1751, but most of it was erected according to Fellner's plans. Nevertheless, he was unable to finish the work and it was left up to Jozsef Grossmann to complete after Fellner's death. It was finally finished in 1783.

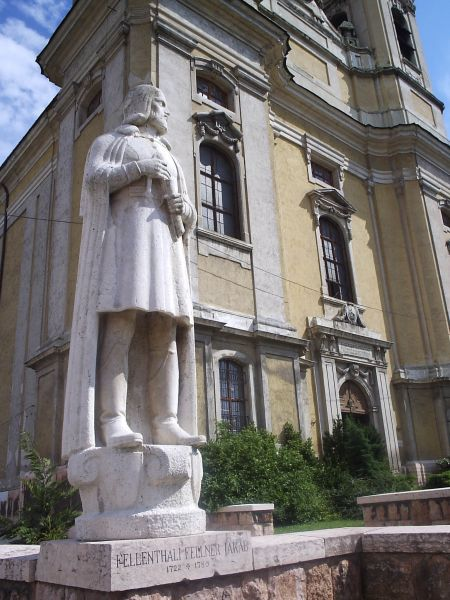
Statue of Jakab Fellner in Tata

In 1764 Bishop Carl Eszterhazy put Fellner in charge of building works and planning in Eger, and this was to become one of the most important periods of his career. His first work for the city was the stairway section of the Bishop's palace and also its chapel in 1766. He also planned the bishop's palace in Veszprém. Fellner completed the Liceum building in Eger which was initially planned by Jozsef Gerl of Vienna. Fellner's last great work was the Parish Church at Pápa in 1773.

Fellner received a title in 1773. He died in Tata, and was buried in the crypt of Christchurch Roman Catholic Church which he had built. His apprentice Jozsef Grossmann finished his unfinished projects and also married his widow. In 1940 a statue was raised in his memory in front of the church in Tata.

== Works ==
- 1751–1776 Tata, Esterhazy castle
- 1751–1783 Tata, RC Parish church
- 1753 Tatabanya, garden city (kertvaros)
- 1754 Tata, Calvary Chapel
- 1754–1758 Cseklészi Castle
- 1760 Penitent St John, RC Church
- 1761 Vértesboglár, Parish house

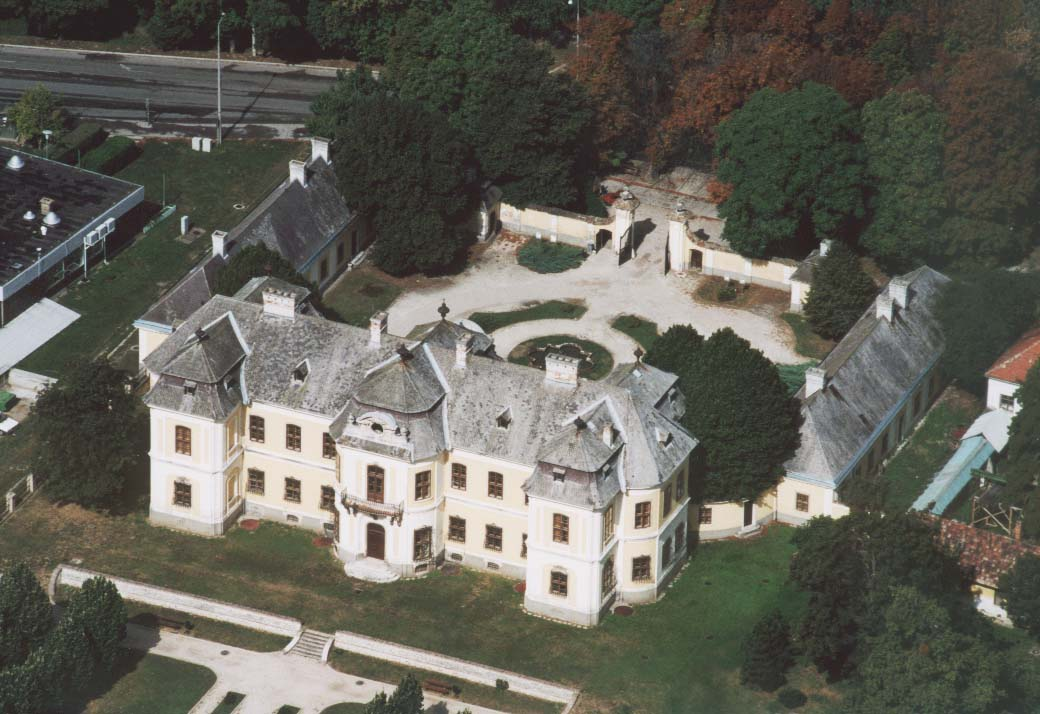
Lamberg Castle in Mór

- 1762–1767 Mór, Lamberg Castle
- 1763–1769 Eger, Primate's Palace
- 1765–1780 Eger, Liceum
- 1765–1776 Veszprém, Bishop's Palace
- 1766 Eger, Bishop's palace stairwell and Chapel
- 1767–1770 Tata, Piarist House
- 1768 Vértesboglár, hotel
- 1770–1778 Veszprém, old people's home
- 1773–1775 Veszprém, seminary
- 1773 Pápa, Eszterházy castle interior remodelling
- 1774–1776 Eger, "Nagypréposti" Palace
- 1774–1783 Papa, Church
- 1775–1777 Nagyigmánd, RC Church
- 1777 Gyömrő, St John of Nepomuk RC Church
- 1777 Borsodszirák, RC Church
- 1777 Ászár, RC Church
- 1773 Pápa, RC Church

Numerous mills, e.g. at Tata and Miklos, the Nepomucenus, Jozsef, Cifra and Tovaros mills.

Also, many country inns, parish churches, commercial buildings and houses were built.
