= Mezőkomárom =

- Location of Fejér county in Hungary

- Location of Mezőkomárom
- Coordinates: 46.82683°N 18.29332°E
- Country: Hungary
- County: Fejér

Area
  - Total: 29.05 km^{2} (11.22 sq mi)

Population (2004)
  - Total: 1,031
  - Density: 35.49/km^{2} (91.9/sq mi)
- Time zone: UTC+1 (CET)
  - Summer (DST): UTC+2 (CEST)
- Postal code: 8137
- Area code: 25

Mezőkomárom is a village in Fejér county, Hungary.
