= Pusztavám =

Village in Fejér county, Hungary

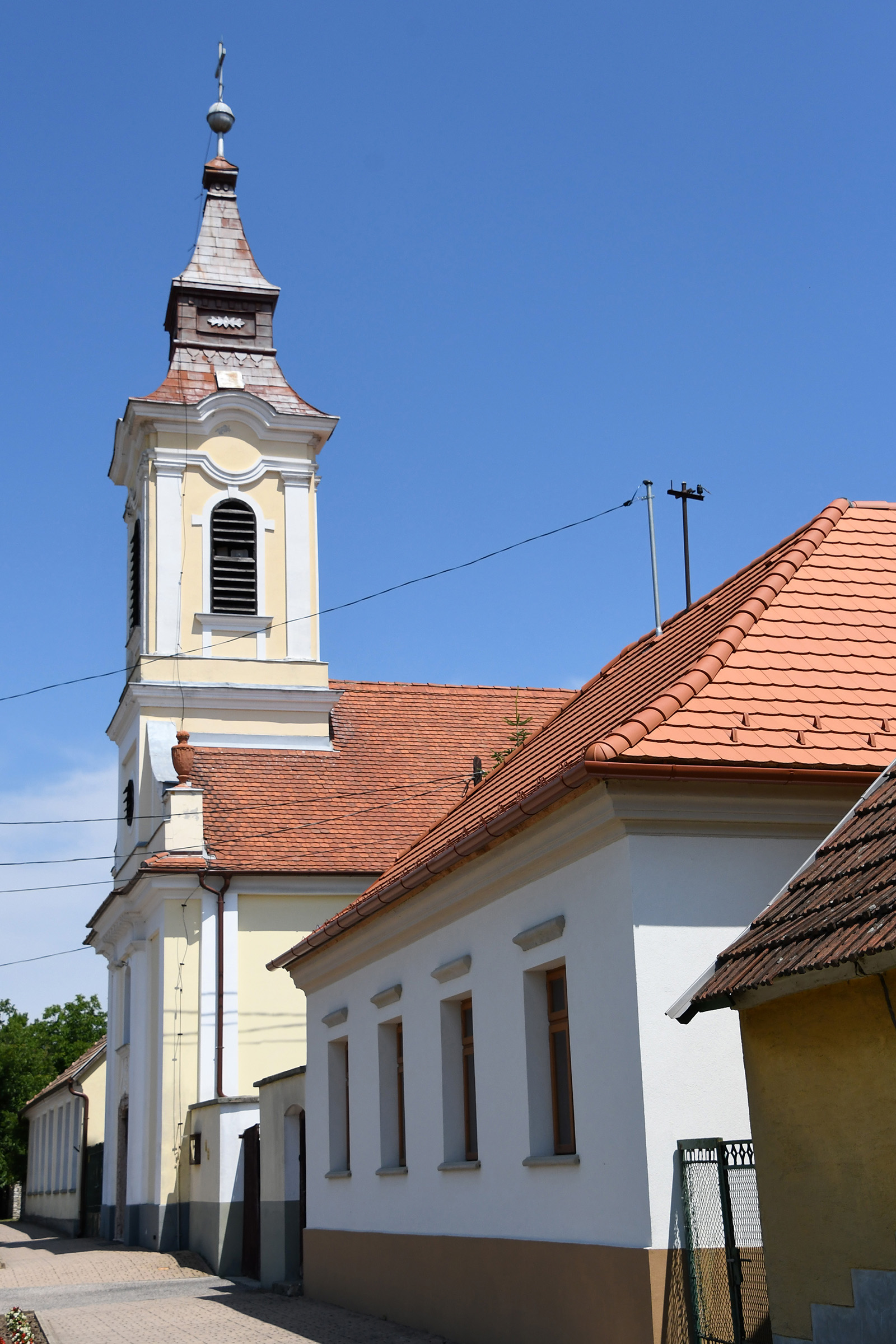

- Flag Coat of arms

- Location of Pusztavám
- Coordinates: 47.43282°N 18.23271°E
- Country: Hungary
- County: Fejér

Area
  - Total: 34.69 km^{2} (13.39 sq mi)

Population (2004)
  - Total: 2,530
  - Density: 72.93/km^{2} (188.9/sq mi)
- Time zone: UTC+1 (CET)
  - Summer (DST): UTC+2 (CEST)
- Postal code: 8066
- Area code: 22
- Website: www.pusztavam.hu

Pusztavám is a village in Fejér County, Hungary. Tucked against the south-western fringe of the Vértes Mountains, Pusztavám occupies 27.6 km^{2} (10.7 sq mi) of gently sloping loess plains and wooded limestone foothills, about 18 kilometres (11 mi) north-west of Székesfehérvár. Census returns record 2,198 inhabitants in 2022, of whom almost 40 % declared German ethnicity—the highest proportion in Fejér County. The main street follows the Császár-víz brook, while farm lanes climb north to the Blue Trail footpath and the ruins of Csikling-vár, a 13th-century hillfort that guards a saddle on the Vértes ridge.

== History ==
Medieval sources cite the settlement as Villa Poshta (1341) and later Puszta-Tam, but the modern village dates from 1724, when Count Esterházy resettled the deserted estate with 56 Swabian families from Württemberg. Their half-timbered longhouses and Roman Catholic piety still colour the streetscape: the triple-naved Church of St John of Nepomuk (1752, rebuilt 1810) anchors the baroque core, and a roadside Schwabenkreuz commemorates those deported to Germany in 1946. Brown coal seams discovered in 1920 triggered a new chapter: the Bányatelep pit opened in 1926, peaked at 220,000 tonnes in 1958 and closed in 1992—today a miners' memorial and an open-air machinery row recall seven decades of underground work.

== Culture and economy ==
Coal's demise shifted employment toward forestry, quarry stone and commuting to the Mór industrial strip, yet the German heritage thrives. Each September the Schwäbischer Kirchweihtag (Kiritog) packs the main square with brass bands, Tracht dancers and sausage stalls, while the local Grundschule teaches a bilingual programme accredited by the National German Minority Self-Government. Tourism is modest but growing: way-marked loops link the village to the István-kilátó panorama tower (404 m) and to hillside cellars producing Olaszrizling for the Mór wine district; cyclists connect via logging tracks to Lake Zámoly and Lake Velence.

Recent EU rural-development grants resurfaced four kilometres of access road and fitted solar panels to the municipal hall, aiming to make Pusztavám a "green gateway" to the Vértes. With its Swabian folk calendar, mining relics and easy access to limestone ridge-walks, the village blends industrial memory and ethnic character in a Transdanubian setting.
