= Baracska =

- Flag Coat of arms

- Location of Fejér county in Hungary

- Location of Baracska
- Coordinates: 47.287439°N 18.756995°E
- Country: Hungary
- County: Fejér

Area
  - Total: 39.68 km^{2} (15.32 sq mi)

Population (2004)
  - Total: 2,729
  - Density: 68.77/km^{2} (178.1/sq mi)
- Time zone: UTC+1 (CET)
  - Summer (DST): UTC+2 (CEST)
- Postal code: 2471
- Area code: 22
- Motorways: M7
- Distance from Budapest: 37.2 km (23.1 mi) Northeast
- Website: www.baracska.hu

Baracska is a village in Fejér county, Hungary.
