= Aba, Hungary =

Aba
- Town
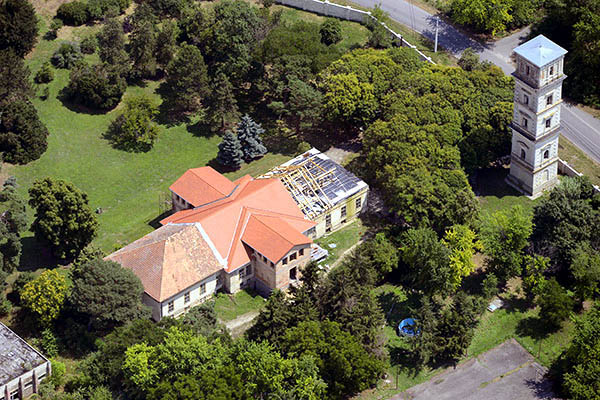
- Zichy Castle

- Flag Coat of arms

- Location of Aba
- Coordinates: 47.03065°N 18.52327°E
- Country: Hungary
- County: Fejér
- District: Székesfehérvár

Area
  - Total: 88.05 km^{2} (34.00 sq mi)

Population (2015)
  - Total: 4,426
  - Density: 50.27/km^{2} (130.2/sq mi)
- Time zone: UTC+1 (CET)
  - Summer (DST): UTC+2 (CEST)
- Postal code: 8127
- Area code: (+36) 22
- Website: www.aba.hu

Aba is a town in Fejér County, Hungary.

In 1559, it was the property of Mihály Cseszneky and Balázs Baranyai.

== Notable residents ==
- Imre Taussig (1894–1945), footballer

== Demographics ==
Population of Aba
Year	Pop.	±%
1870	2,997	—
1880	3,004	+0.2%
1890	3,313	+10.3%
1900	3,533	+6.6%
1910	4,099	+16.0%
1920	4,046	−1.3%
1930	4,067	+0.5%
1941	4,199	+3.2%
1949	4,303	+2.5%
1960	4,369	+1.5%
1970	4,282	−2.0%
1980	4,143	−3.2%
1990	3,941	−4.9%
2001	4,506	+14.3%
2010	4,687	+4.0%
Source: "Hungarian Central Statistical Office".

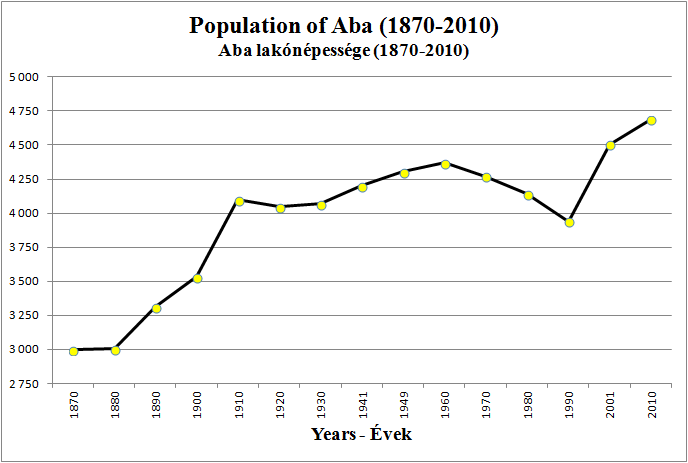
Population of Aba (between 1870 and 2010)

== Villages ==
- Bodakajtor

== Sources ==
- Szíj Rezső: Várpalota
- Fejér megyei történeti évkönyv
- Hofkammerarchiv Wien
- Dudar története
