= Dég =

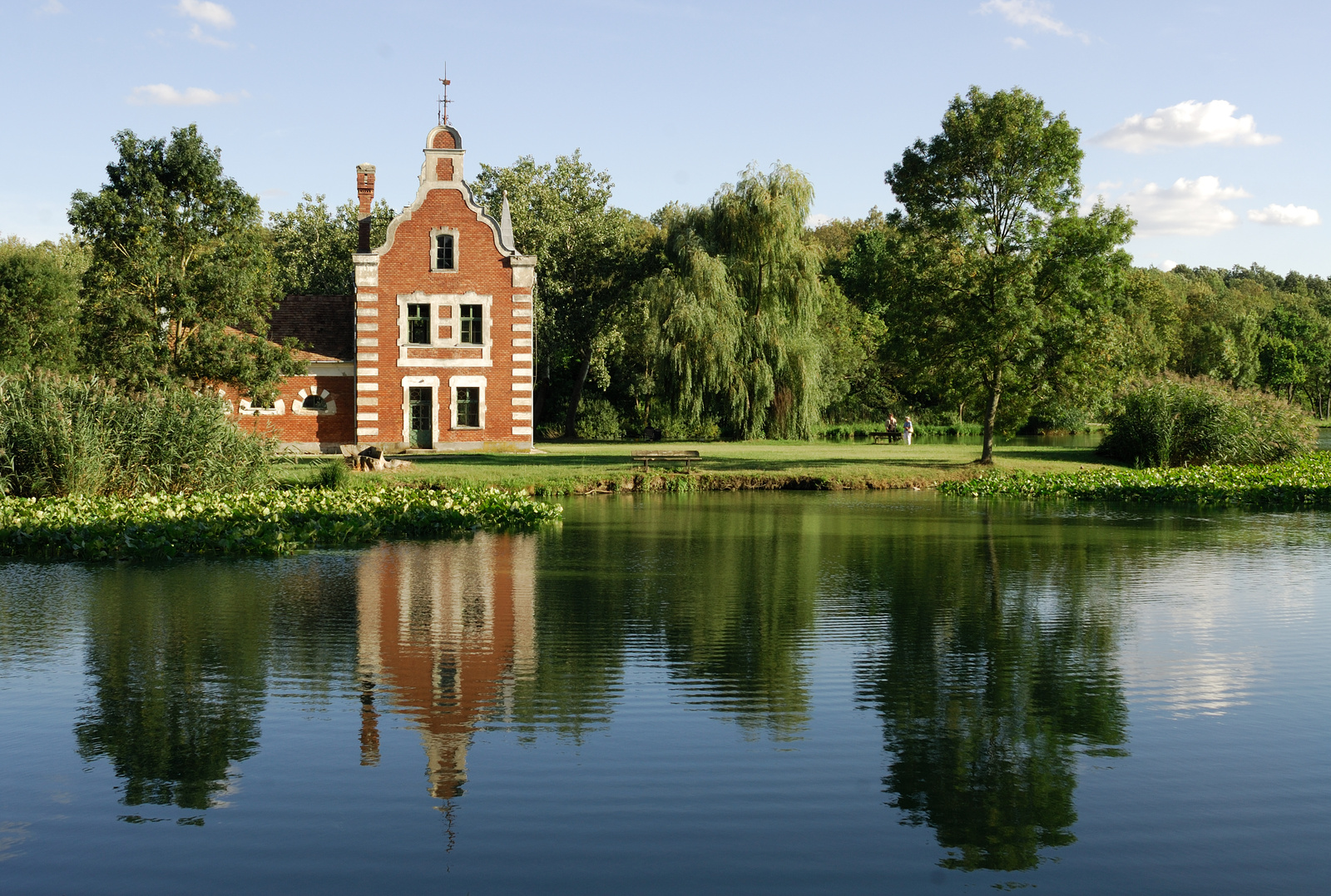
- Dutch House ("Hollandi ház") in the park of the Festetics Mansion in Dég

- Location of Fejér county in Hungary

- Location of Dég
- Coordinates: 46.87075°N 18.44224°E
- Country: Hungary
- County: Fejér

Area
  - Total: 46.86 km^{2} (18.09 sq mi)

Population (2004)
  - Total: 2,345
  - Density: 50.04/km^{2} (129.6/sq mi)
- Time zone: UTC+1 (CET)
  - Summer (DST): UTC+2 (CEST)
- Postal code: 8135
- Area code: 25
- Website: www.deg.hu

Dég is a village in Fejér county, Hungary.
