= Pátka =

Village in Fejér county, Hungary

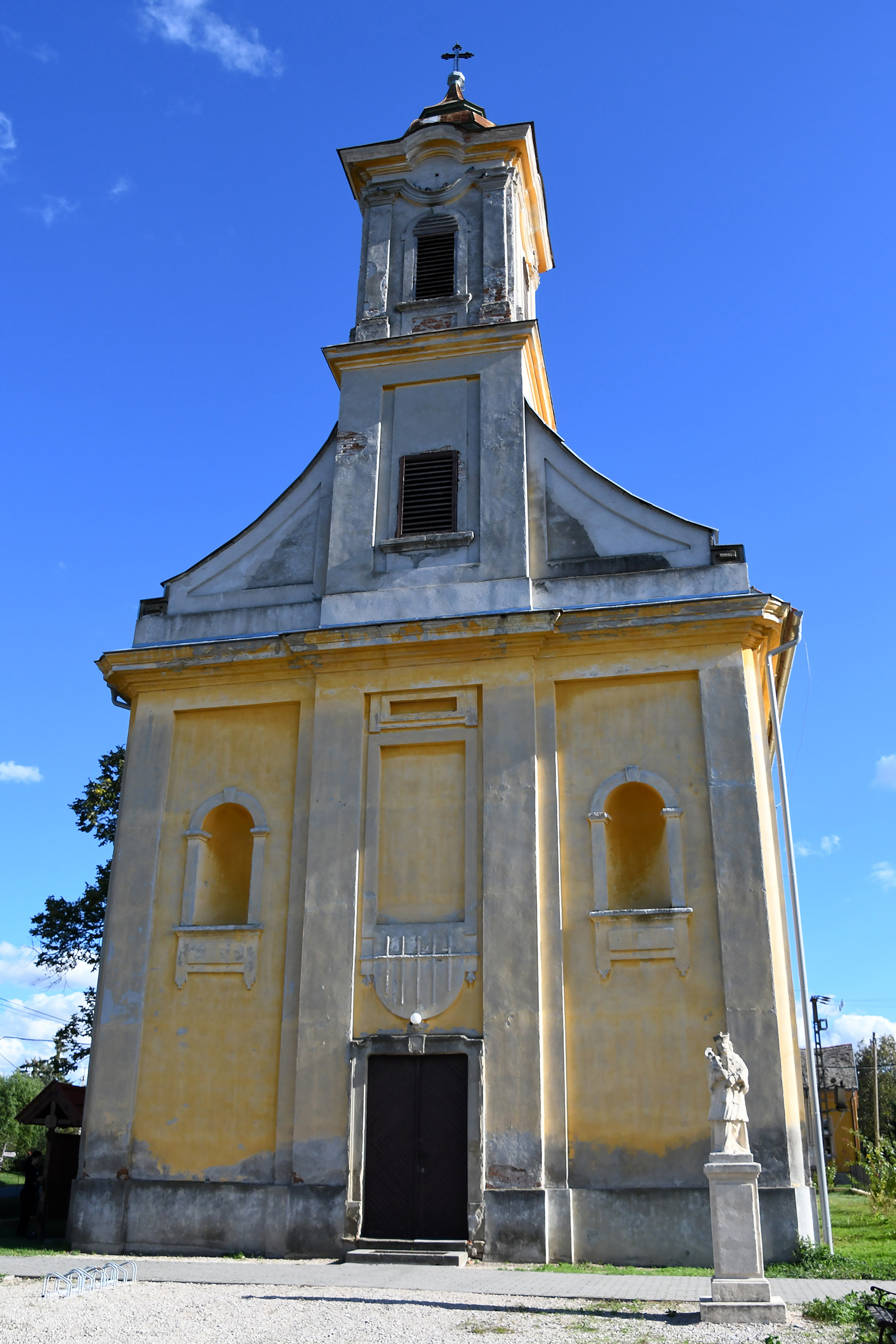

- Location of Pátka
- Coordinates: 47.27629°N 18.49479°E
- Country: Hungary
- County: Fejér

Area
  - Total: 40.38 km^{2} (15.59 sq mi)

Population (2004)
  - Total: 1,645
  - Density: 40.73/km^{2} (105.5/sq mi)
- Time zone: UTC+1 (CET)
  - Summer (DST): UTC+2 (CEST)
- Postal code: 8092
- Area code: 22
- Website: www.patka.hu

Pátka is a village in Fejér county, Hungary. Located just north of Lake Velence and 12 km northwest of Székesfehérvár, the village extends across 40.4 km^{2} of loess plain and low crystalline ridges in the western foothills of the Velence Hills. The village is notably home to the Pátkai-víztározó, a 312-hectare reservoir created in 1975 by damming the Császár-víz watercourse, which serves as a water-supply buffer for Lake Velence and supports a rich diversity of bird species. While maintaining a stable permanent population of around 1,770 residents, Pátka has increasingly oriented toward recreation and commuter living since the 1990s, attracting anglers, birdwatchers, and cyclists to its natural attractions and heritage sites.

== Description ==
Lying just north of Lake Velence, Pátka extends across 40.4 km^{2} (15.6 sq mi) of loess plain and low crystalline ridges in the western foothills of the Velence Hills. The village sits at 47.2763°N 18.4948°E, 12 km north-west of Székesfehérvár. The cadastral area is drained south-east by the regulated channel of the Császár-víz watercourse. In 1975 this stream was impounded with an earthfill barrage to create the Pátkai-víztározó, a 312-ha reservoir holding 7.9 million cubic metres; together with the Zámolyi basin it forms the water-supply buffer for Lake Velence. The lake's wide reedbeds and shallow bays now support at least 167 bird species—including spoonbill, white-tailed eagle and rare migrants such as lesser white-fronted goose—prompting conservationists to propose local protected-area status. Heavy abstraction to bolster Lake Velence, however, left the reservoir perilously low and triggered a mass fish kill in December 2023; the managing angling federation ordered a full drawdown and fish rescue in early 2024, suspending all fishing until water quality recovers.

== History ==
Archaeology shows that the site has been occupied since the Bronze Age. Rampart traces at Szűzvár mark a late prehistoric hillfort, while silver hoards and the masonry remains of a 4th-century Roman dam on the Császár-víz testify to continuous use of the valley's water resources. The name Patka appears in royal charters of 1192 as Patca/Pathka, probably derived from the Old Hungarian personal name Paty plus the diminutive -ka. Alternative etymologies suggest that the name of the settlement Pátka might be derived from the Hungarian word for rat, patkány, due to the large presence of rodents. Another theory proposes a Slavic origin, connecting it to the Slavic word for duck, patka, since the settlement has historically been surrounded by wetlands and water reservoirs that serve as a natural habitat for waterfowl. This is further supported by the fact that no historical landlord named "Paty" is recorded in the early medieval charters of Fejér County.

During the Ottoman wars the village was repeatedly depopulated, then repopulated in the 18th century by Calvinist settlers whose Baroque church (1730) still stands on Fő utca. Pátka next enters national history on 29 September 1848, when the triangle of Pátka–Pákozd–Sukoró formed the left wing of General János Móga's defensive line that halted Josip Jelačić's Croatian army in the first major clash of the Hungarian War of Independence.

== Recent history ==
Industrial ventures arrived late in Pátka. Exploration for lead–zinc veins beneath Szűzvár opened a small fluorspar mine in 1952; it closed in 1967, and the ore-dressing plant was dismantled six years later. Since the 1990s the settlement has shifted toward recreation and commuting: census estimates show the permanent population holding steady around 1,770 in 2025, yet weekend numbers swell with anglers, bird-watchers and cyclists heading for the reservoir and the 33-km Velence-lake cycle loop. Local government promotes "green heritage" tourism by maintaining way-marked trails around the Roman dam and installing a lakeshore bird hide, while plans for a wetland reserve hinge on resolving long-term water-level management at Pátkai-víztározó.
