= Gárdony District =

Gárdony District Gárdonyi járás
- Districts of Hungary
- Coat of arms

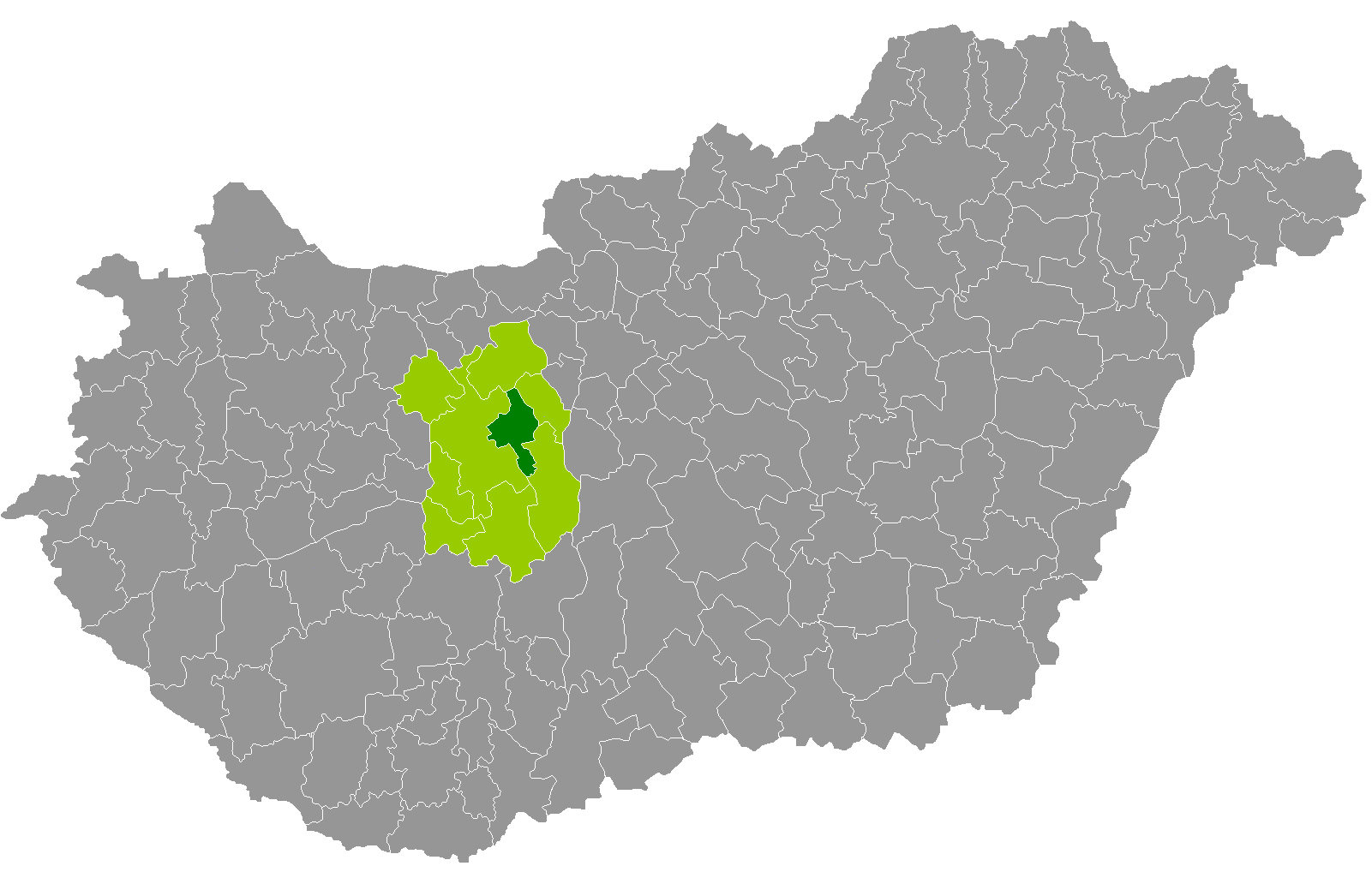
- Gárdony District within Hungary and Fejér County.
- Coordinates: 47.19°N 18.61°E
- Country: Hungary
- County: Fejér
- District seat: Gárdony

Area
  - Total: 306.79 km^{2} (118.45 sq mi)
  - Rank: 7th in Fejér

Population (2011 census)
  - Total: 29,406
  - Rank: 5th in Fejér
  - Density: 96/km^{2} (250/sq mi)

Gárdony (Hungarian: Gárdonyi járás) is a district in central-eastern part of Fejér County. Gárdony is also the name of the town where the district seat is found. The district is located in the Central Transdanubia Statistical Region.

== Geography ==
Gárdony District borders with Bicske District to the north, Martonvásár District to the east, Dunaújváros District to the southeast, Székesfehérvár District to the south and west. The number of the inhabited places in Gárdony District is 10.

== Municipalities ==
The district has 2 towns and 8 villages. (ordered by population, as of 1 January 2012)

- **Gárdony** (9,927) – district seat
- Kápolnásnyék (3,610)
- Nadap (540)
- Pákozd (3,199)
- Pázmánd (2,029)
- Sukoró (1,295)
- Szabadegyháza (2,168)
- **Velence** (5,359)
- Vereb (786)
- Zichyújfalu (941)

The bolded municipalities are cities.

== See also ==
- List of cities and towns in Hungary
