= Pákozd =

Village of Fejér county in Hungary

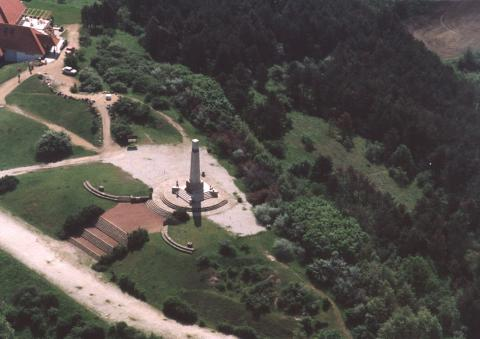
- Battle of Pákozd monument from above

- Flag Coat of arms

- Location of Pákozd
- Coordinates: 47.22112°N 18.54493°E
- Country: Hungary
- County: Fejér

Area
  - Total: 43.32 km^{2} (16.73 sq mi)

Population (2004)
  - Total: 2,829
  - Density: 65.3/km^{2} (169/sq mi)
- Time zone: UTC+1 (CET)
  - Summer (DST): UTC+2 (CEST)
- Postal code: 8095
- Area code: 22
- Motorways: M7
- Distance from Budapest: 54.3 km (33.7 mi) Northeast
- Website: www.pakozd.hu

Pákozd is a village in Fejér county, Hungary. Set between Lake Velence and the granite dome of the Velence Hills, Pákozd covers 43.3 km^{2} (16.7 sq mi) of rolling loess and ancient crystalline outcrops just off the M7, 15 km north-west of Székesfehérvár. The village is nationally significant as the site of the Battle of Pákozd (29 September 1848), commemorated by the Katonai Emlékpark Pákozd (KEMPP), a National Memorial Site that attracts over 90,000 visitors annually with its military history exhibits and re-enactments. Once primarily a lakeside farming community, Pákozd has transformed into a growing commuter and recreational settlement, with its population increasing from 2,245 in 1980 to 3,665 in 2022, driven by second-home development and its proximity to Budapest.

== Description ==
The village core edges the northern lakeshore, but its cadastral land climbs south-west to the panoramic Mészeg-hegy and south-east to Sár-hegy, where a 44-ha protected geotope shelters the celebrated Ingókövek ('balancing rocks'). These weather-rounded granite blocks—Pogány-kő, Oroszlán-szikla, Kocka and others—rose to the surface as overlying gneiss eroded, making Pákozd the only Hungarian site with textbook granite tors. Way-marked trails link the rocks to vineyards belonging to the Etyek–Buda wine district and to the new Bence-hegy Lookout Tower, whose steel lattice affords wide views over the lake, reedbeds and migrating waterfowl. Sport fishing, sailing and a 33-km cycle-ring around Lake Velence reinforce Pákozd's role as the outdoor hub of the Gárdony District.

Pákozd entered national consciousness on 29 September 1848, when General János Móga's outnumbered Honvéd army halted Ban Josip Jelačić's advance on the capital in the Battle of Pákozd. An obelisk raised on Mészeg-hegy in 1951 grew into today's Katonai Emlékpark Pákozd (KEMPP)—a 1.6-ha National Memorial Site with open-air artillery displays, interactive galleries on Hungarian military history and re-enactment events that draw more than 90,000 visitors a year. Census data show that the settlement, once a lakeside farming village, is now a fast-growing commuter and holiday community: population climbed from 2,245 in 1980 to 3,665 in 2022, fuelled by second-home construction along the lake and daily commuting to Budapest (54 km by motorway). Despite suburban pressure, local planners have kept a green corridor between the memorial park and the Ingókövek, ensuring that hiking routes, wine-cellar lanes and the lakeshore reeds remain contiguous.

== Gallery ==
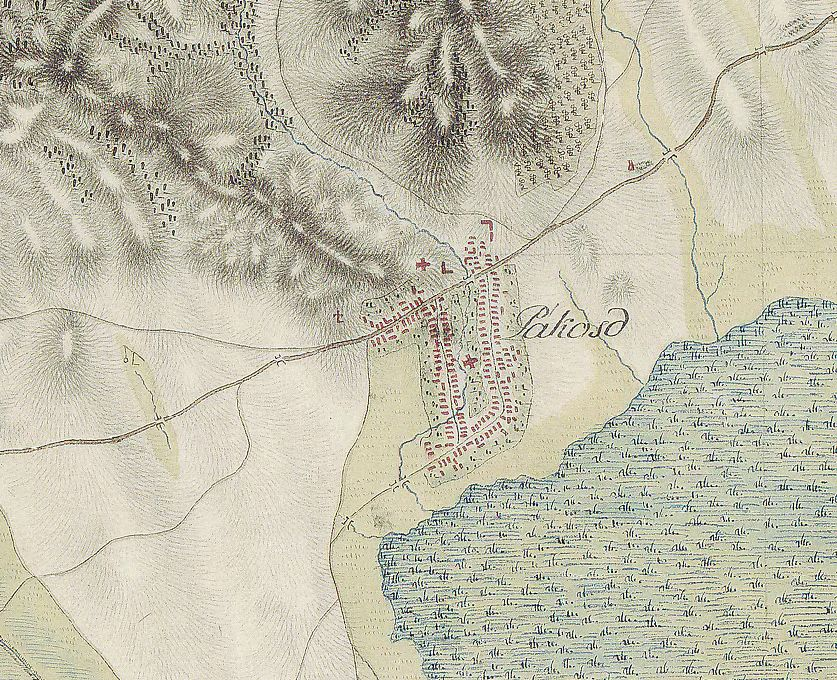
The map of Pákozd from the First Military Mapping Survey of Austria Empire.

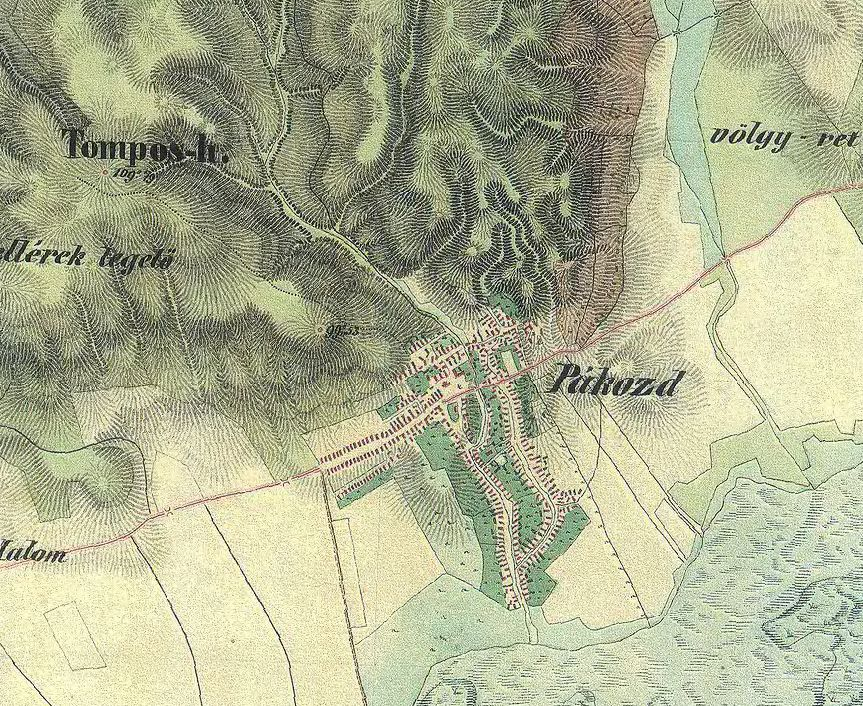
The map of Pákozd from the Second Military Mapping Survey of Austria Empire.

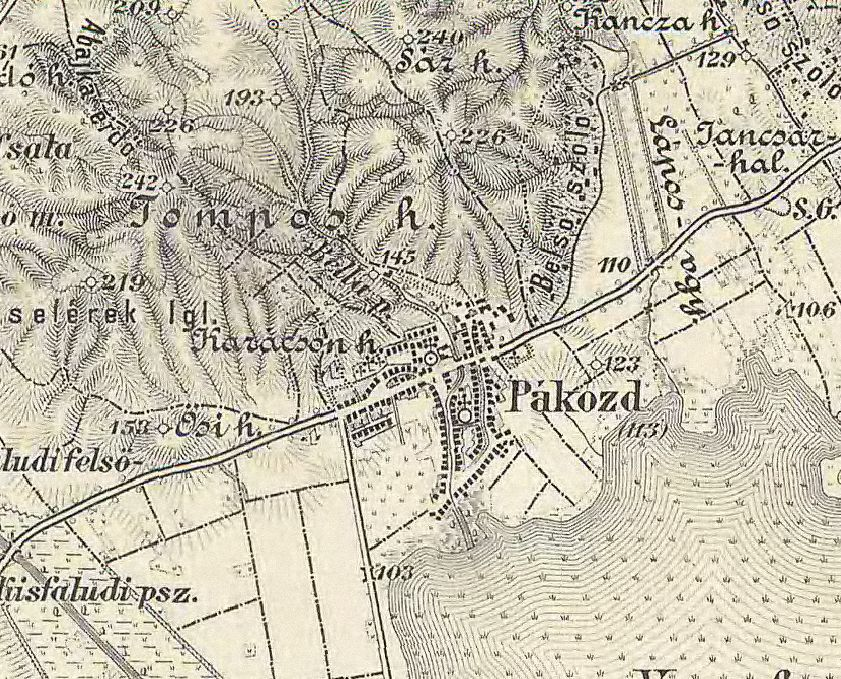
The map of Pákozd from the 3rd Military Mapping Survey of Austria Empire.
