= Gárdony =

- Town
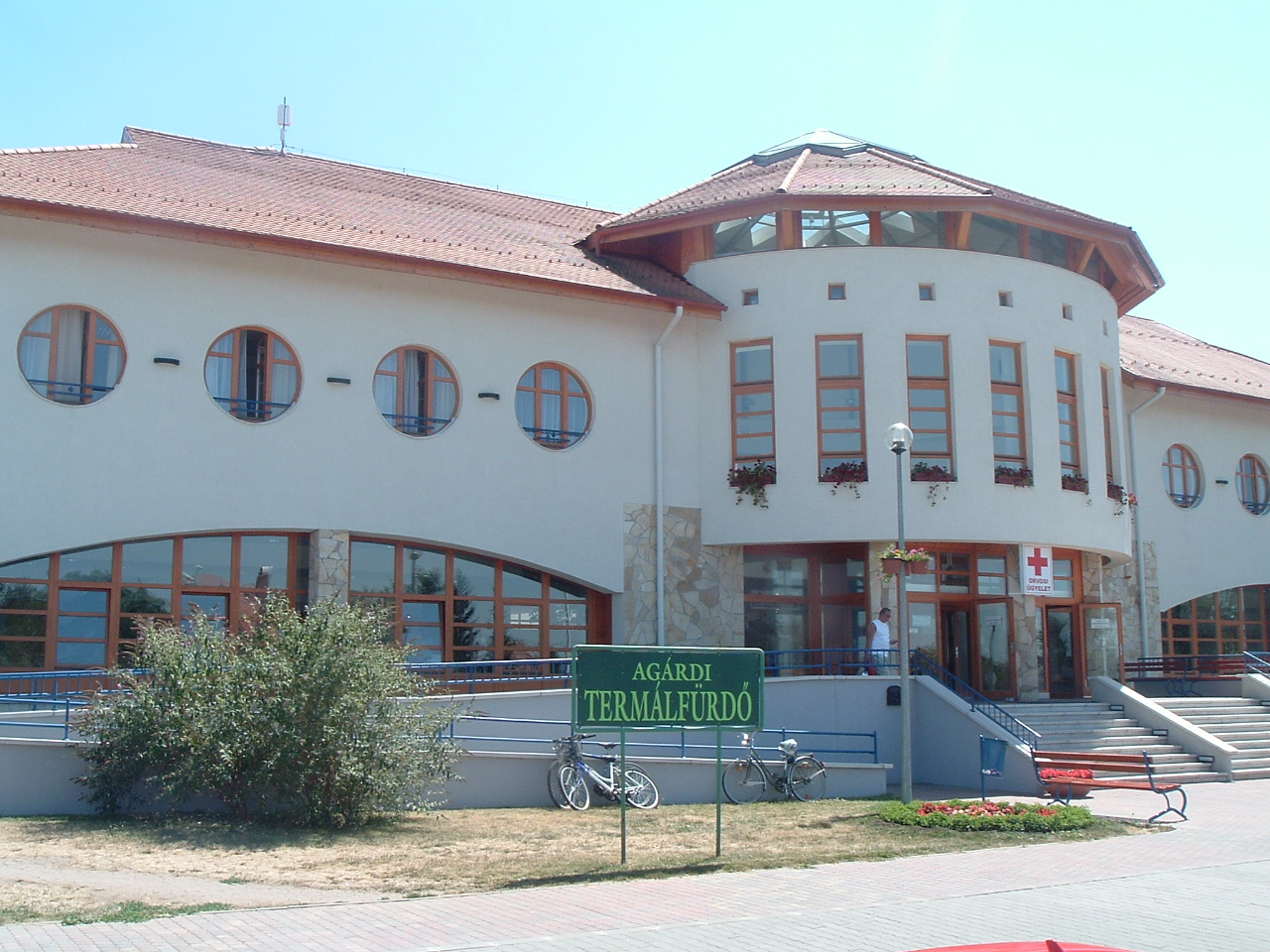
- Thermal Bath of Gárdony

- Flag Coat of arms

- Location of Gárdony
- Coordinates: 47.19731°N 18.60906°E
- Country: Hungary
- County: Fejér
- District: Gárdony

Area
  - Total: 63.50 km^{2} (24.52 sq mi)

Population (2017)
  - Total: 10,855
  - Density: 170.9/km^{2} (442.7/sq mi)
- Time zone: UTC+1 (CET)
  - Summer (DST): UTC+2 (CEST)
- Postal code: 2483
- Area code: (+36) 22
- Motorways: M7
- Distance from Budapest: 51.3 km (31.9 mi) Northeast
- Website: www.gardony.hu

Gárdony is a town in Fejér county, Hungary. It is located 55 km (34 miles) from Budapest, the capital of Hungary.

== Etymology ==
The name Gárdony is believed to have originated in the early 13th century.

== History ==
There is at least one known writing dating back to 1260 that referred to Gardun, King of Zsigmond (1387-1437).

On 31 March 1989 Gárdony changed its status from village to town.

== Geography ==
This town is next to Lake Velencei and is a popular summer destination. The town is divided into three parts: Gárdony, Agárd and Dinnyés and lies on the south shore of the lake.

In the summertime thousands of tourists visit the lake. In fact, several new resorts have recently opened on the shore of the lake. The lake is known as a great destination to bring the family. Tourists, who like water sports such as boating, swimming, sailing and fishing enjoy the lake. On the shore, there are facilities for volleyball, basketball, tennis, and football. Additionally, there is live entertainment planned throughout the summer months.

== Notable people ==
Géza Gárdonyi was born in Gárdony. He was born in Agárdpuszta and a statue of him is located centre park of Agárd.

== Twin towns – sister cities ==
Gárdony is twinned with:

- Gieboldehausen, Germany
- Kirchbach, Austria
- Lesquin, France
- Mörlenbach, Germany
- Postbauer-Heng, Germany
- Salo, Finland
- Valea Crișului, Romania
- Żary, Poland

== Sport ==
The association football club, Gárdonyi VSC, is based in the town.

== Gallery ==
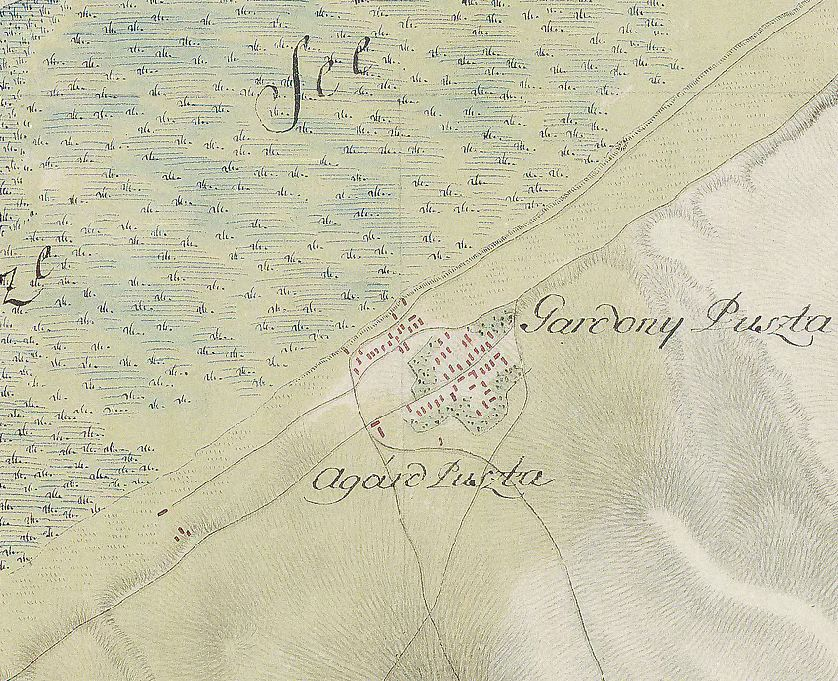
The map of Gárdony from the First Military Mapping Survey of Austria Empire.

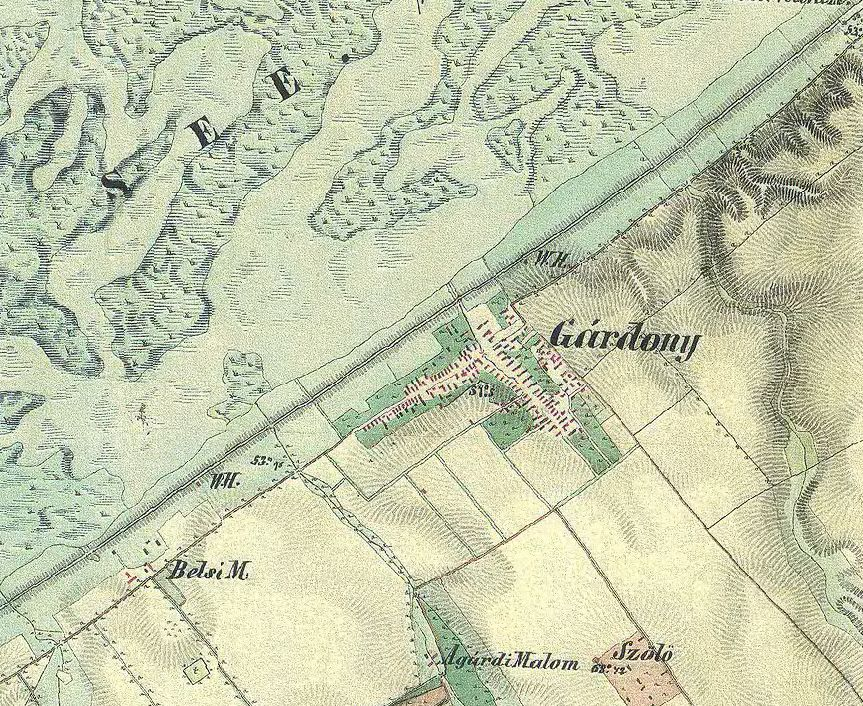
The map of Gárdony from the Second Military Mapping Survey of Austria Empire.

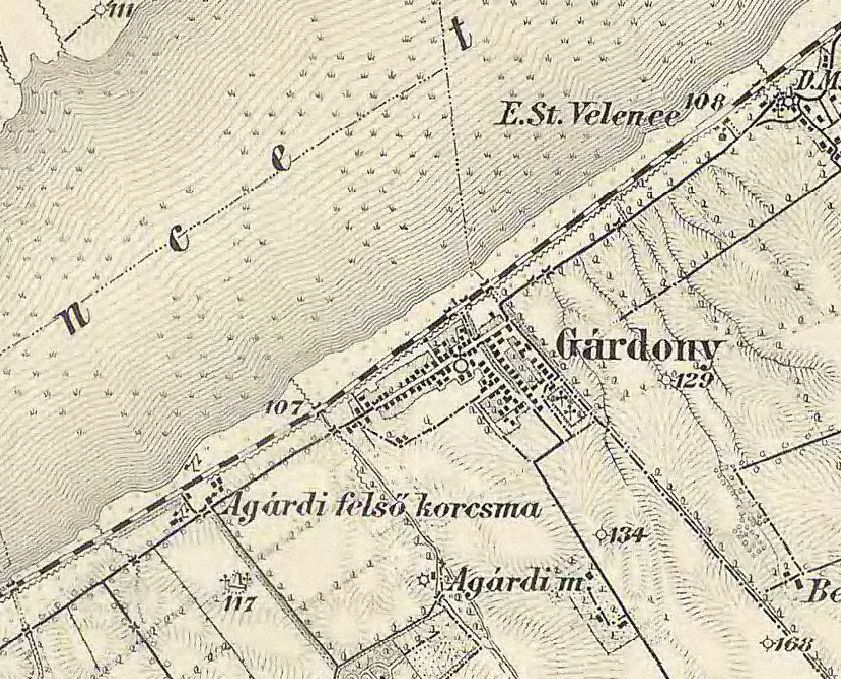
The map of Gárdony from the 3rd Military Mapping Survey of Austria Empire.

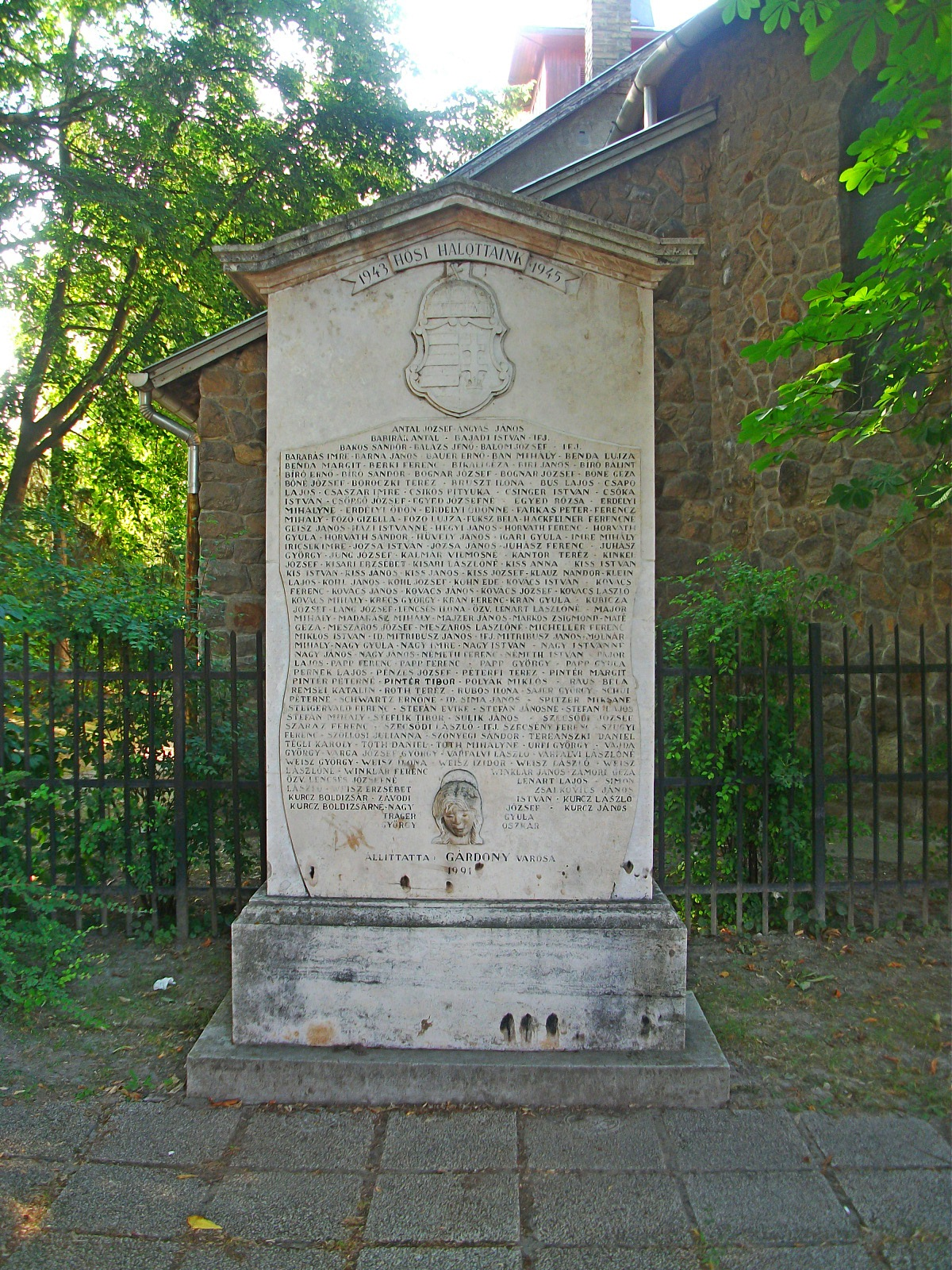
Second World War Memorial

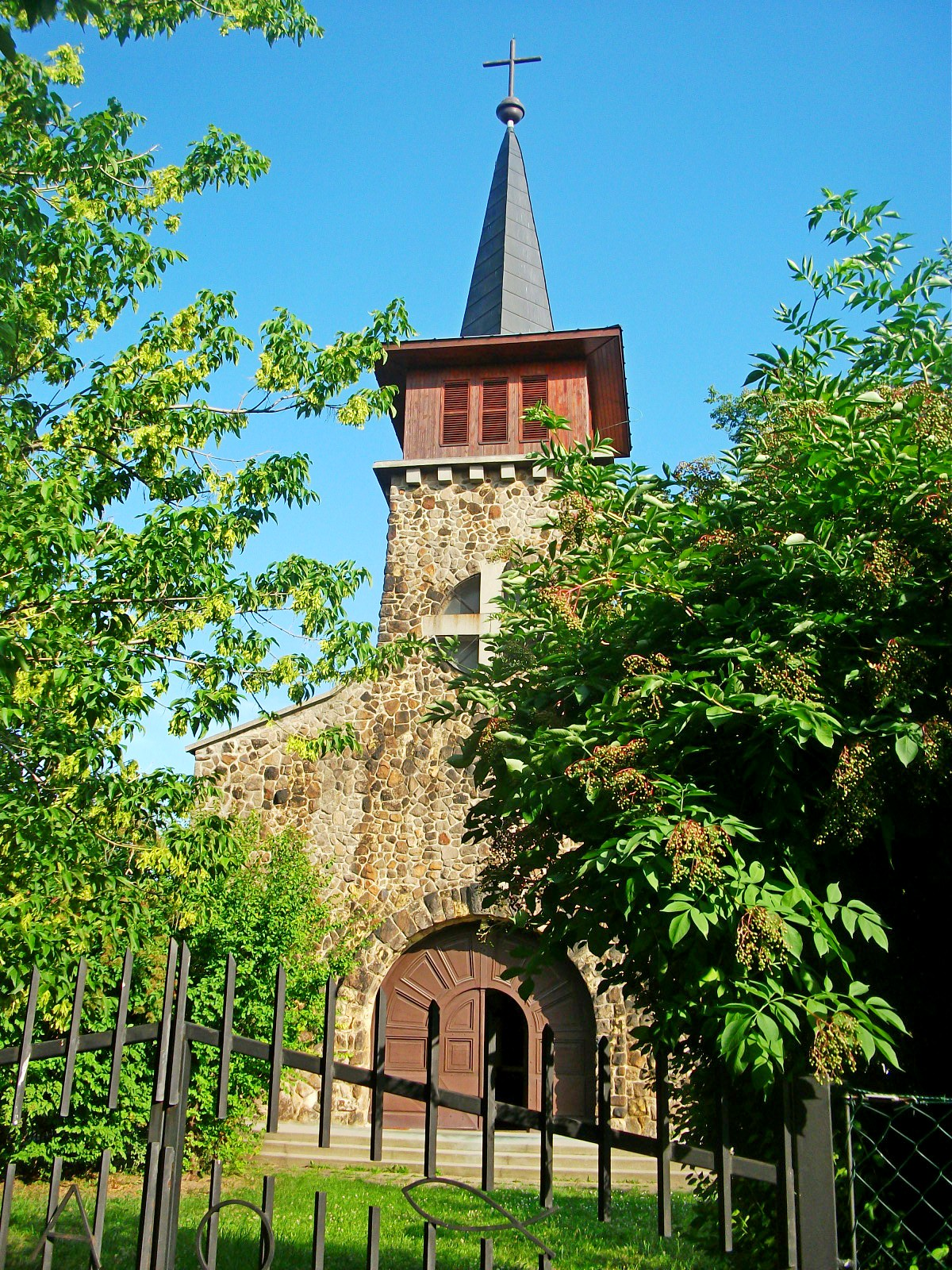
Sacred Heart Church

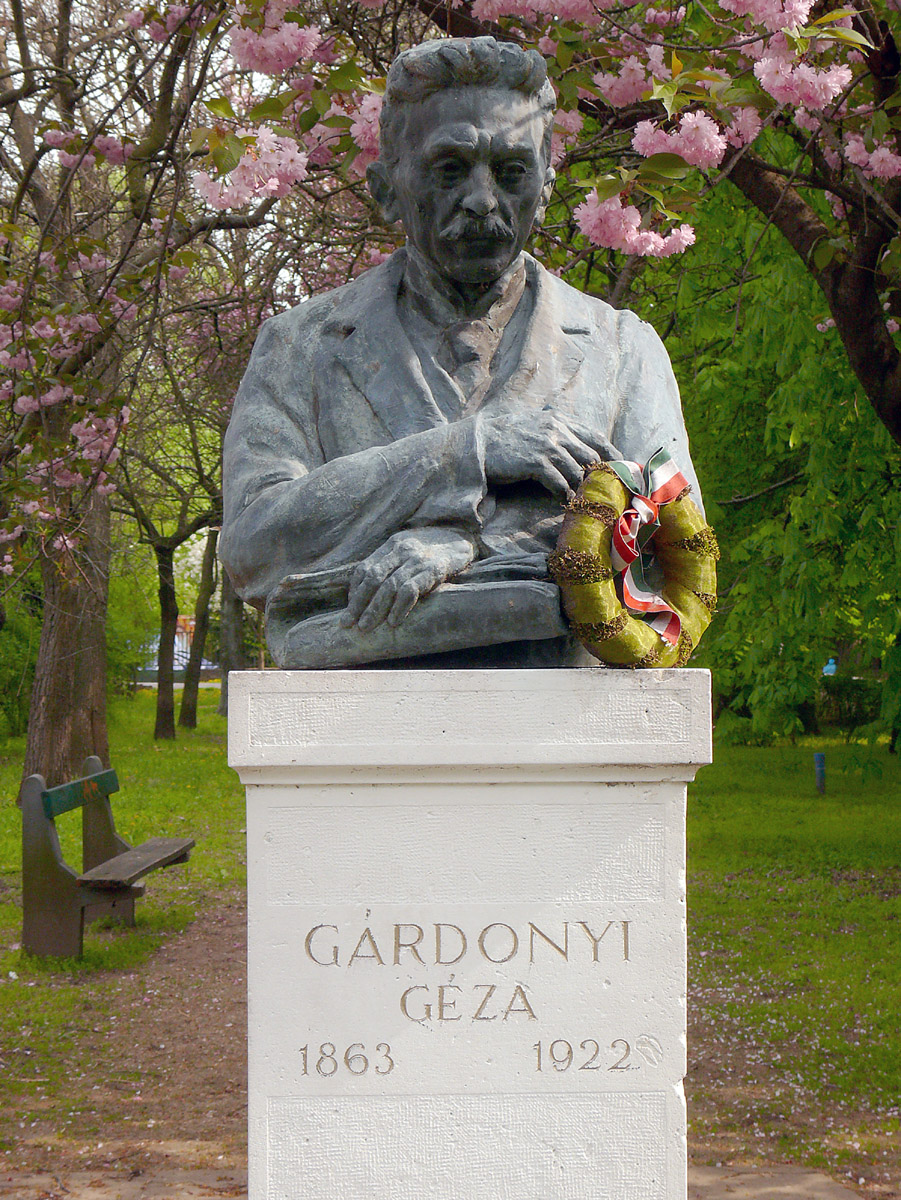
Statue of Géza Gárdonyi

== See also ==
- Csiribpuszta
- Agárd
