= Csiribpuszta =

Coordinates: 47.159074°N 18.636106°E

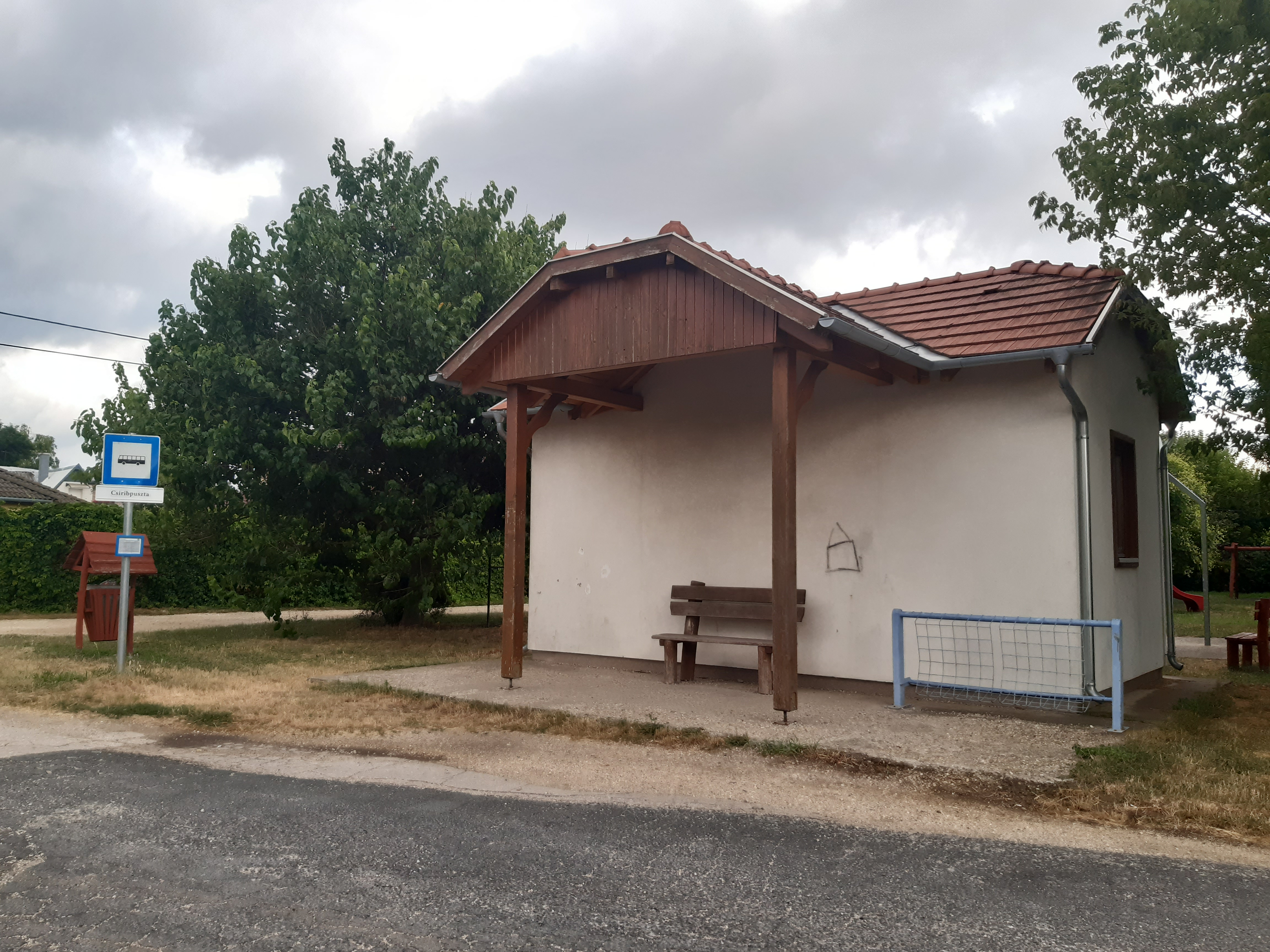
Bus station of Csiribpuszta in Nádasdy street

Csiribpuszta is a former village, now a part of Gárdony, Hungary. The postal code is 2484.

== Geography ==
Csiribpuszta's altitude is 150 meters.

It currently has a population of around 137 (in 2010).

It lies approximately 6,5 km south of Gárdony.
