= Pázmánd =

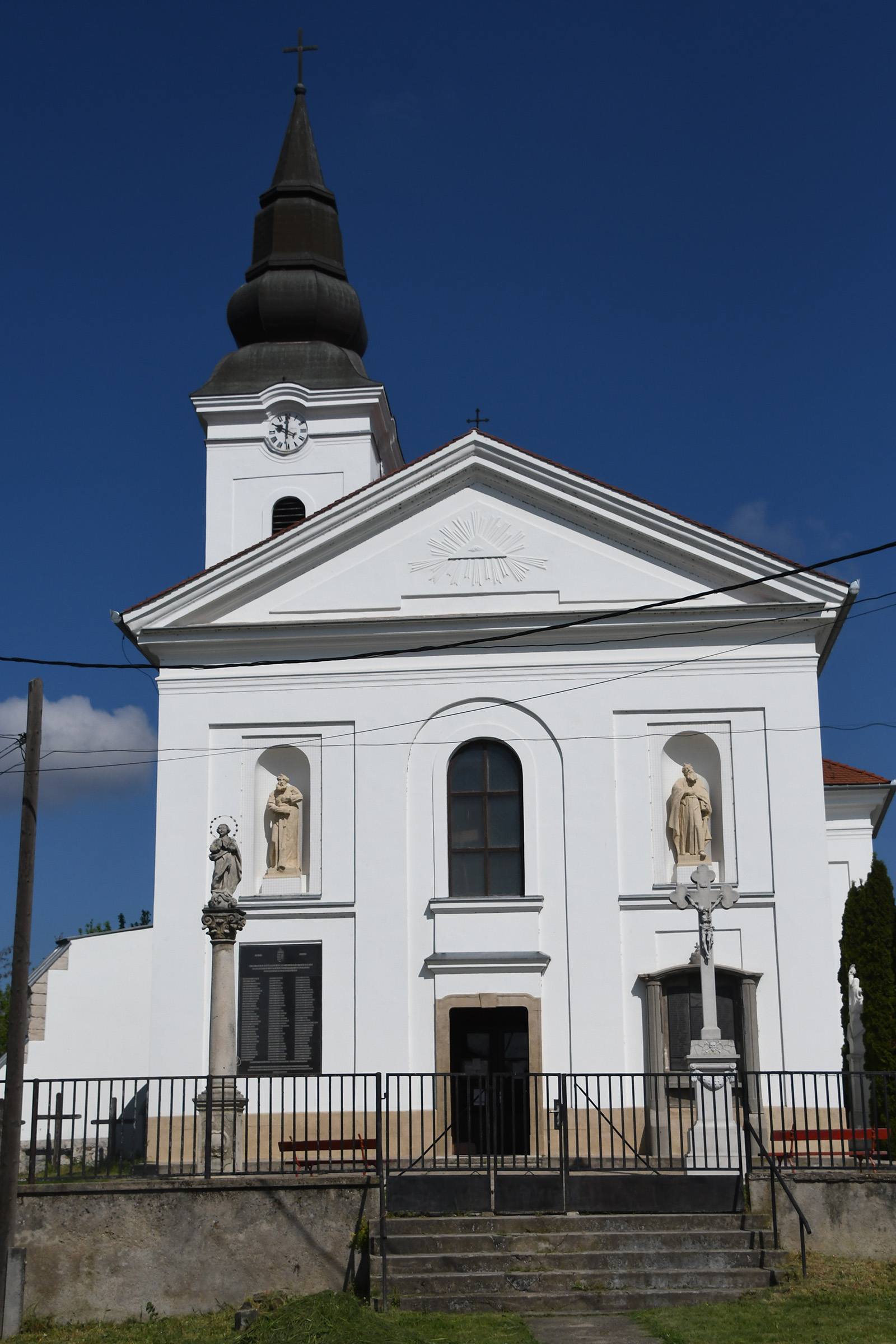

- Flag Coat of arms

- Location of Fejér county in Hungary

- Location of Pázmánd
- Coordinates: 47.28745°N 18.65425°E
- Country: Hungary
- County: Fejér

Area
  - Total: 27.14 km^{2} (10.48 sq mi)

Population (2004)
  - Total: 2,015
  - Density: 74.24/km^{2} (192.3/sq mi)
- Time zone: UTC+1 (CET)
  - Summer (DST): UTC+2 (CEST)
- Postal code: 2476
- Area code: 22
- Motorways: M7
- Distance from Budapest: 44.6 km (27.7 mi) Northeast
- Website: www.pazmand.hu

Pázmánd is a village in Fejér county, Hungary. Situated between Lake Velence and the quartzitic tors of the Velence Hills, it covers 27.1 km^{2} (10.5 sq mi) of gently rising loess and ancient granite, approximately 6 kilometres (3.7 mi) from the lake shore and 50 kilometres (31 mi) south-west of Budapest. The village is home to the Pázmándi Quartzite Rocks Nature Reserve, a dramatic mini-gorge carved through 37-million-year-old volcanic quartzite that features sculptural rock formations and Mediterranean relic plants. With a growing population that increased from 1,989 in 2001 to 2,313 in 2022, Pázmánd maintains its historical connection to viticulture through local micro-wineries producing the community blend Könnyűvér, while also developing tourism around its geological features, historical sites and position within the Velence Hills' "Volcano Country" hiking network.

== Description ==
Situated between Lake Velence and the quarzitic tors of the Velence Hills, Pázmánd covers 27.1 km^{2} (10.5 sq mi) of gently rising loess and ancient granite only 6 kilometres (3.7 mi) from the lake shore and 50 kilometres (31 mi) south-west of Budapest. Census figures show steady growth from 1,989 inhabitants in 2001 to 2,313 in 2022, fuelled by commuters and second-home owners drawn by the M7 motorway and Velence's bathing beaches. Viticulture remains the backbone of local farming: south-facing plots on Kálvária- and Zsidókő-hegy supply grapes to several micro-wineries that bottle the community blend Könnyűvér, a light Kékfrankos-based red marketed under the "Pázmándi Bor" umbrella.

Archaeological surveys trace continuous human settlement back to the Iron Age; Roman road fragments and late-imperial coins mark Pázmánd's spot on the main Danube–Savaria route. Mediaeval charters of 1051 list the estate among the crown grants to the Hont-Pázmány clan, whose name lives on in the village's toponymy. Ottoman raids left Pázmánd virtually uninhabited, but 18th-century resettlement by German wine-growers rebuilt the street plan still visible today and erected the Baroque Catholic church on Fő utca, renovated in 2017 with EU rural-development funds. Above the houses, a hillside Calvary—three white crosses first recorded in 1796 and restored in 2016—crowns the steep path to Zsidókő-hegy and serves as the backdrop to Easter passion plays.

The same hill shelters the Pázmándi Quartzite Rocks Nature Reserve (Pázmándi Kvarcitsziklák), a narrow, sixty-metre-deep mini-gorge chiselled through 37-million-year-old volcanic quartzite. Sculptural blocks such as Cápa-uszony ("Shark Fin") and Boszorkány-konyha ("witches' kitchen") line the signed red-trail circuit; their fissures host Mediterranean relic plants and attract boulderers, while the summit platform opens broad views over the Fejér plain to the Danube. Village tourism capitalises on this geodiversity: way-marked walks link the gorge to an 18th-century watermill replica, a barefoot sensory park and local cellar lanes, slotting Pázmánd into the Velence Hills' branded "Volcano Country" hiking network.

== Gallery ==
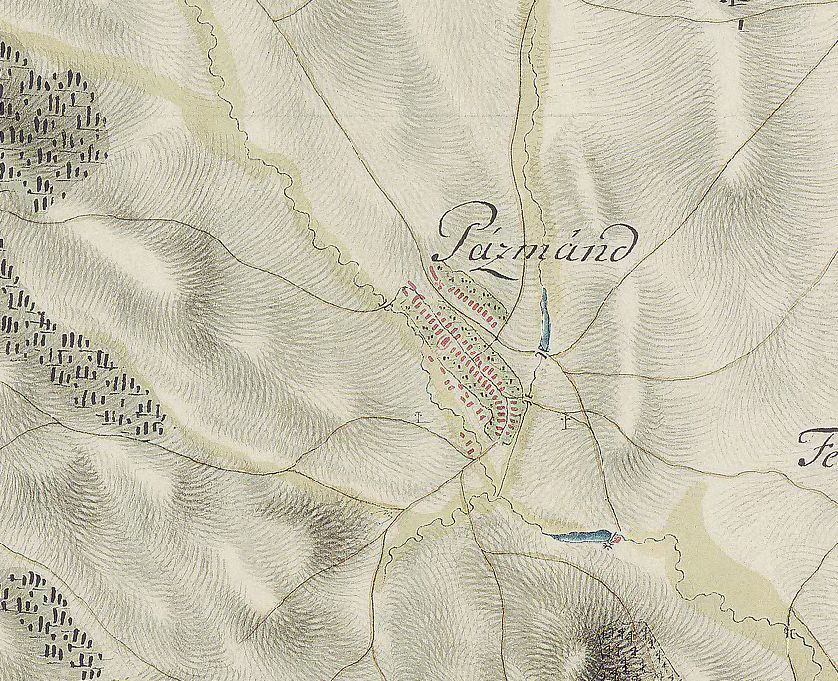
The map of Pázmánd from the First Military Mapping Survey of Austria Empire.

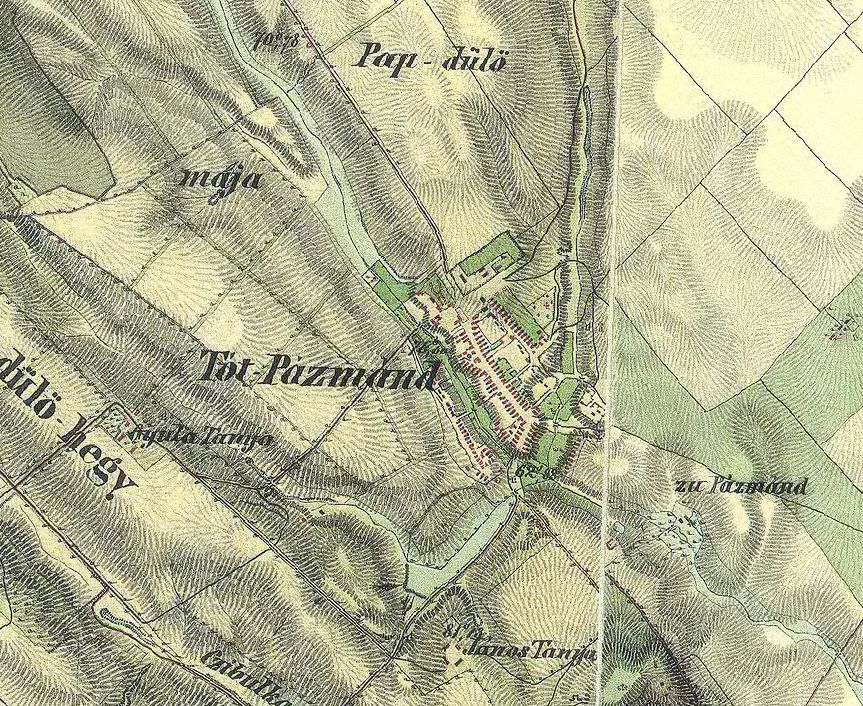
The map of Pázmánd from the Second Military Mapping Survey of Austria Empire.

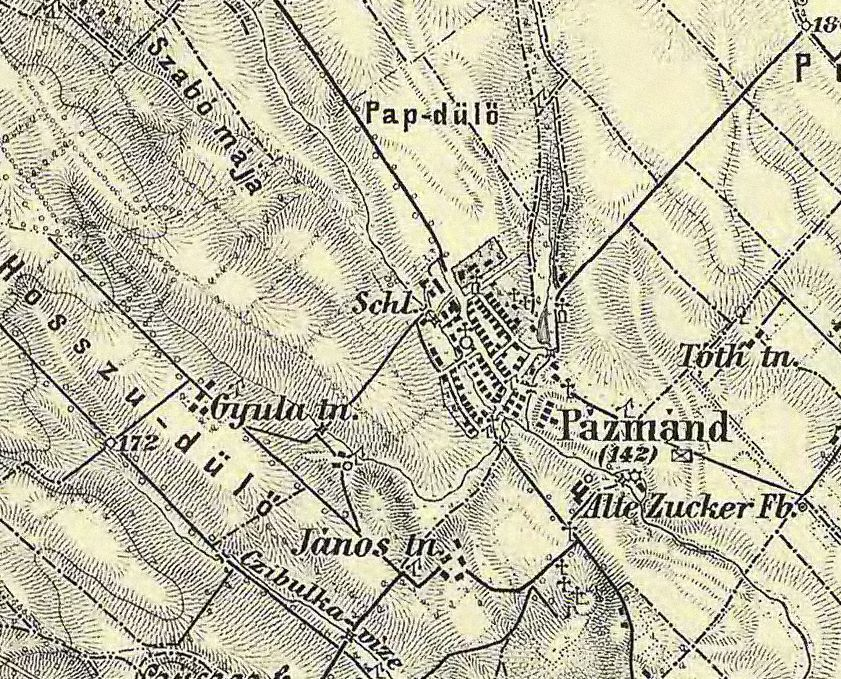
The map of Pázmánd from the 3rd Military Mapping Survey of Austria Empire.
