= Lake Velence =

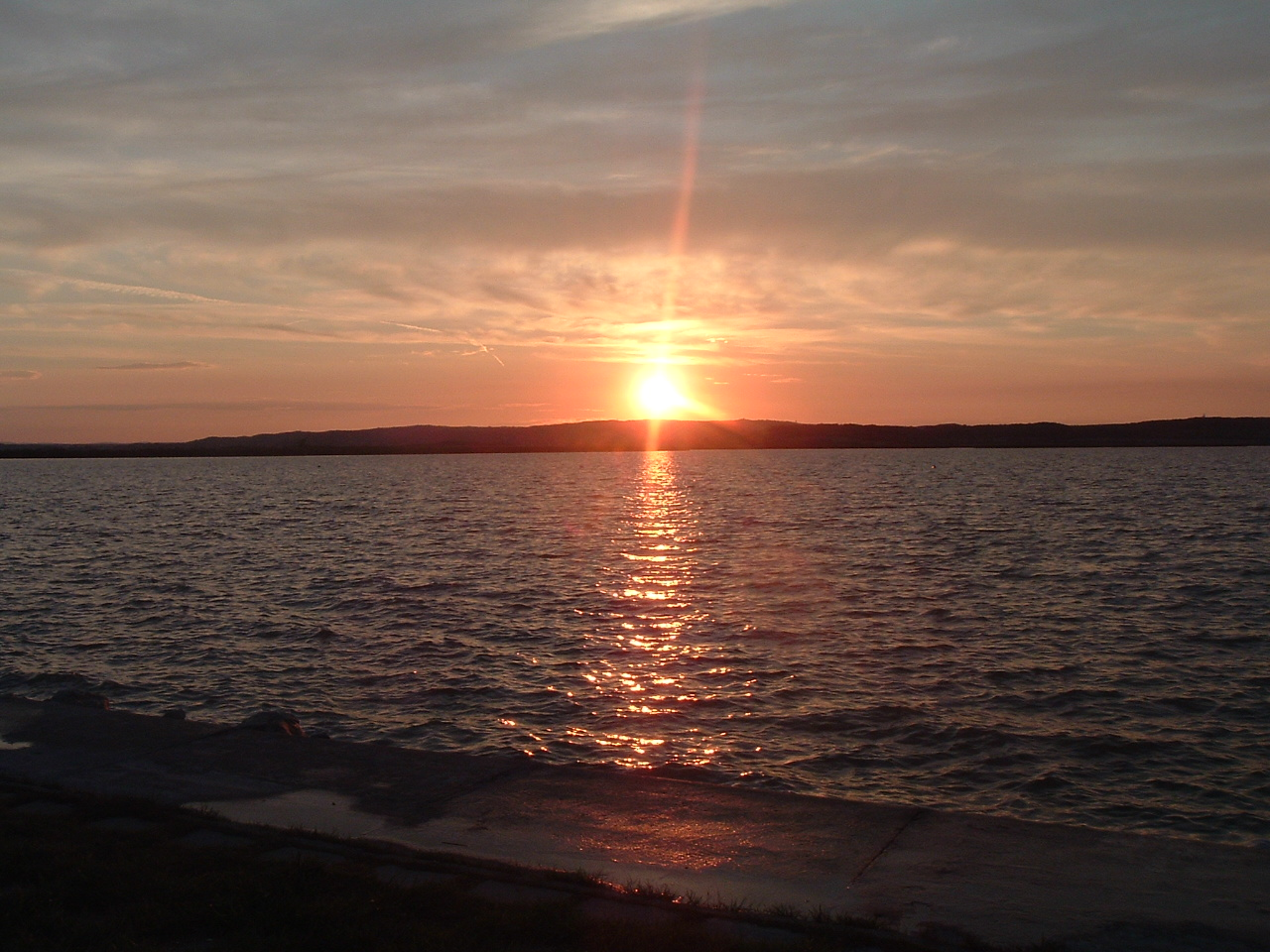
- Lake Velence near Agárd

- Location within Hungary
- Location: Fejér
- Coordinates: 47°12′30″N 18°36′00″E
- Type: steppe lake
- Basin countries: Hungary
- Max. length: 10.8 km (6.7 mi)
- Max. width: 3.3 km (2.1 mi)
- Surface area: 26 km^{2} (10 sq mi)
- Average depth: 1.60 m (5 ft 3 in)
- Shore length^{1}: 28.5 km (17.7 mi)
- Settlements: see list
- ^{1} Shore length is not a well-defined measure.

Lake Velence (Hungarian: Velencei-tó [ˈvɛlɛnt͡sɛji ˈtoː]; German: Welenzer See), an endorheic basin, is the third largest natural lake in Hungary. It is a popular holiday destination among Hungarians.

The lake has an area of 26 km^{2}, one third of which is covered by the common reed. Because of the sunny climate of the area and the shallowness of the lake, it is one of the warmest lakes in Europe: its temperature in the summer may reach 26 to 28 °C.

== Location ==
Lake Velence is located in Fejér county, close to the M7 motorway between Budapest and Székesfehérvár, at the foot of the Velence Hills.

== Settlements along the shore ==
- Gárdony
  - Agárd
  - Dinnyés
- Kápolnásnyék
- Nadap
- Pákozd
- Pázmánd
- Sukoró
- Velence
  - Velence-újtelep
  - Velencefürdő
- Vereb
- Zichyújfalu

== Wildlife ==
A part of the lake is a bird reserve with a lot of species.

== Events ==
The lake was the venue for the World Rowing Masters Regatta in September 2019.

== Gallery ==
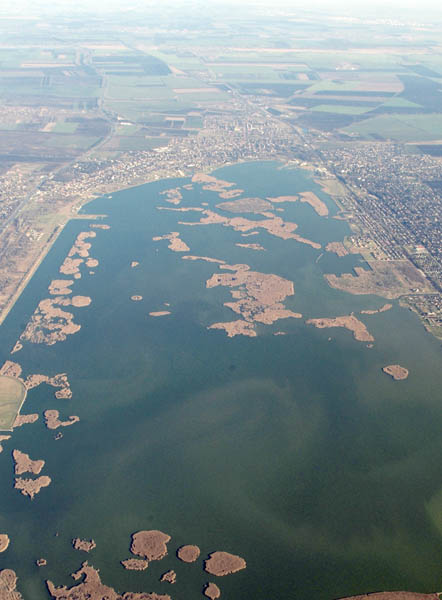

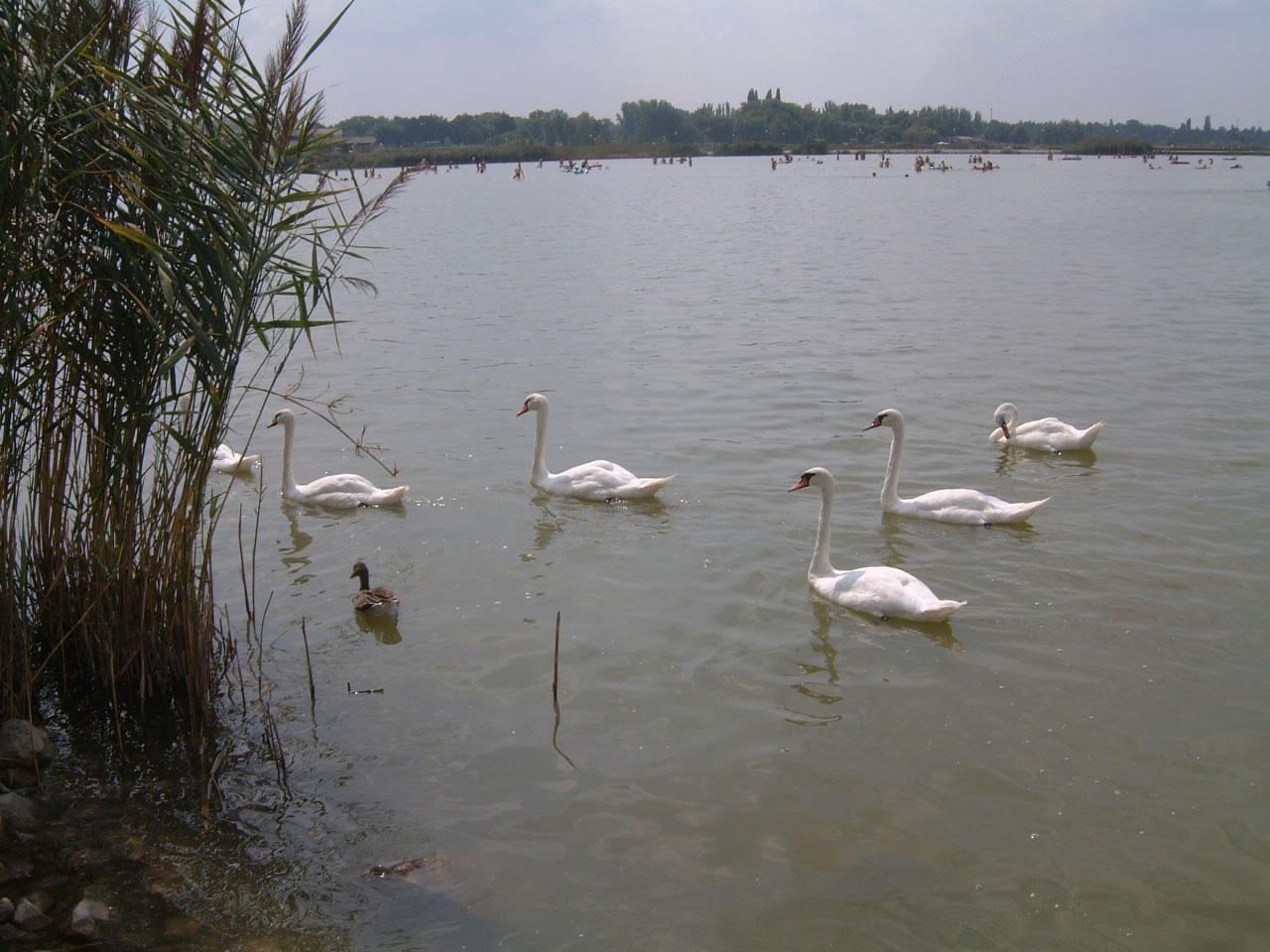

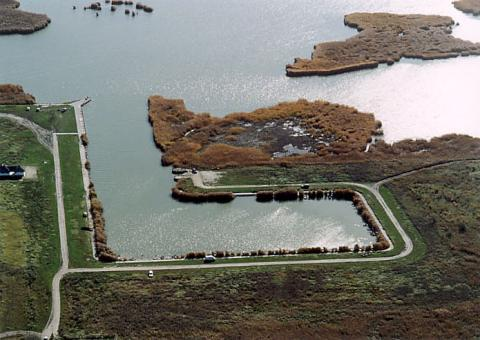

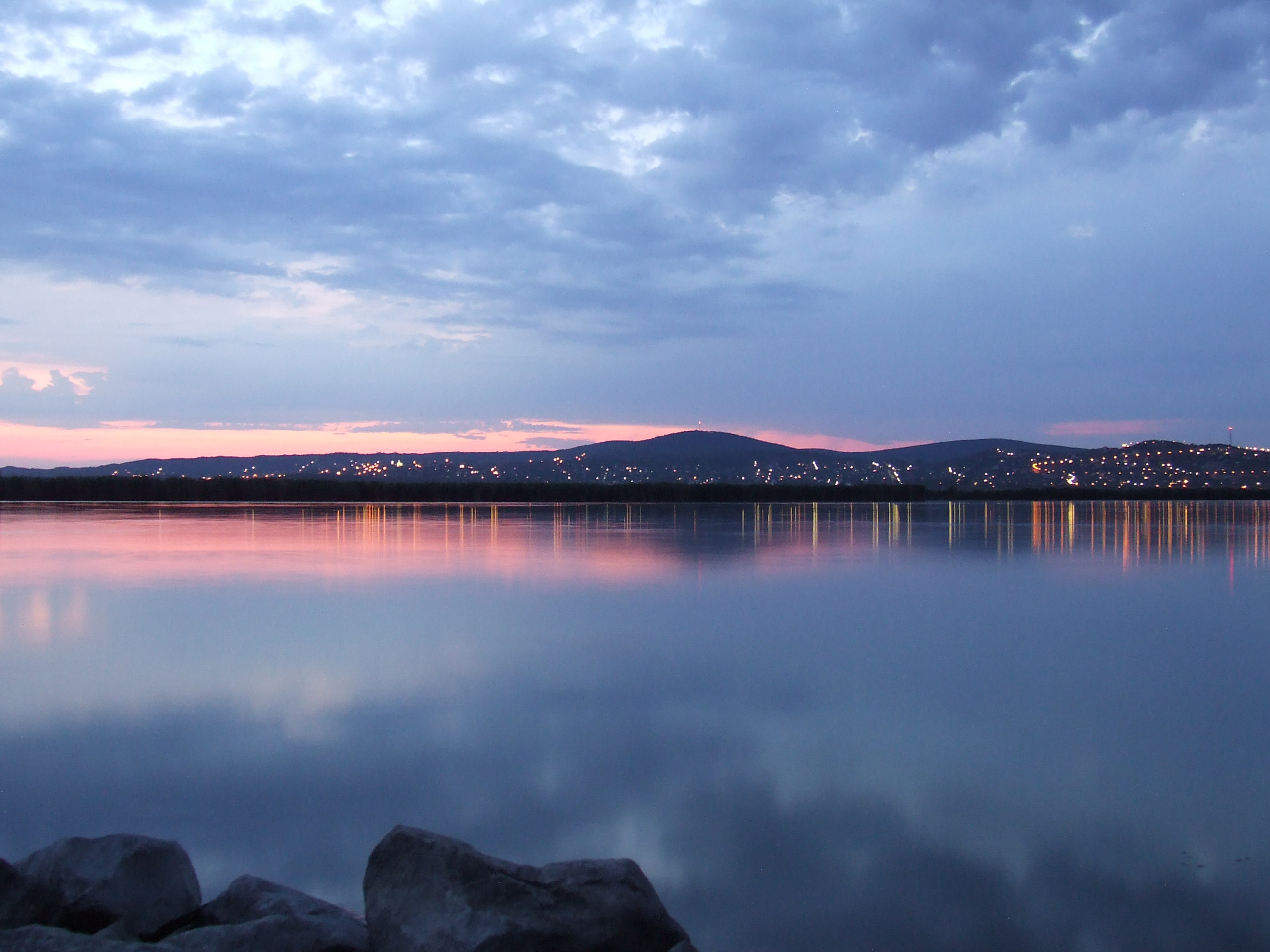

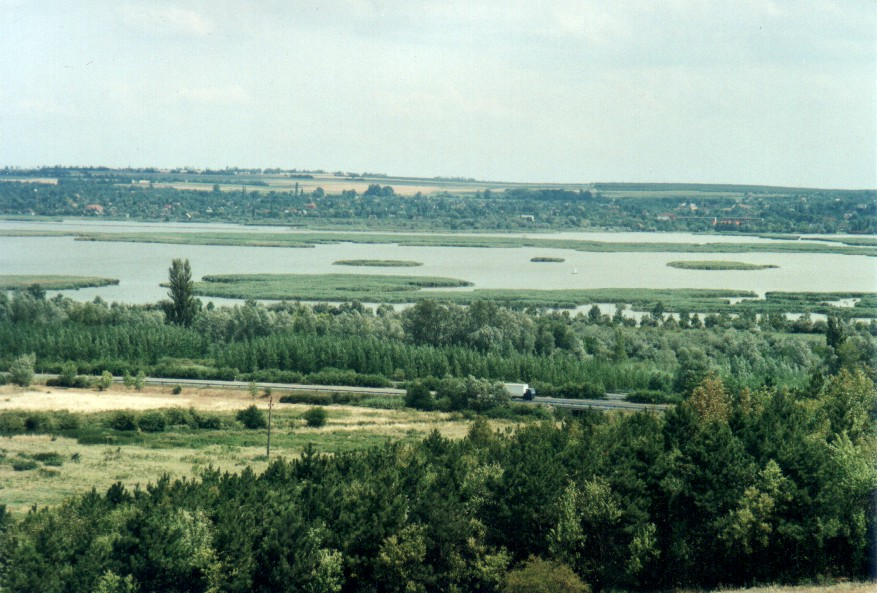

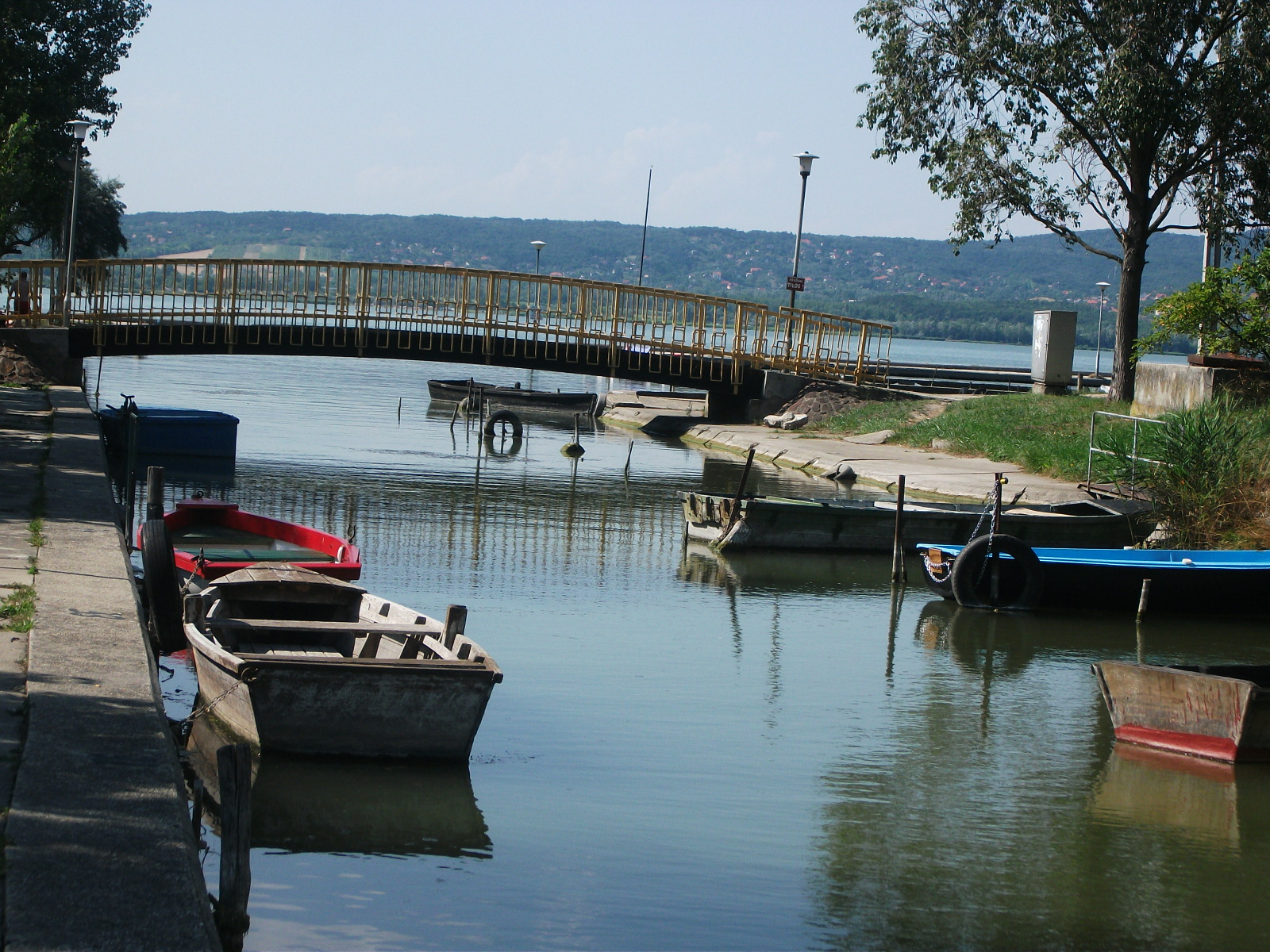

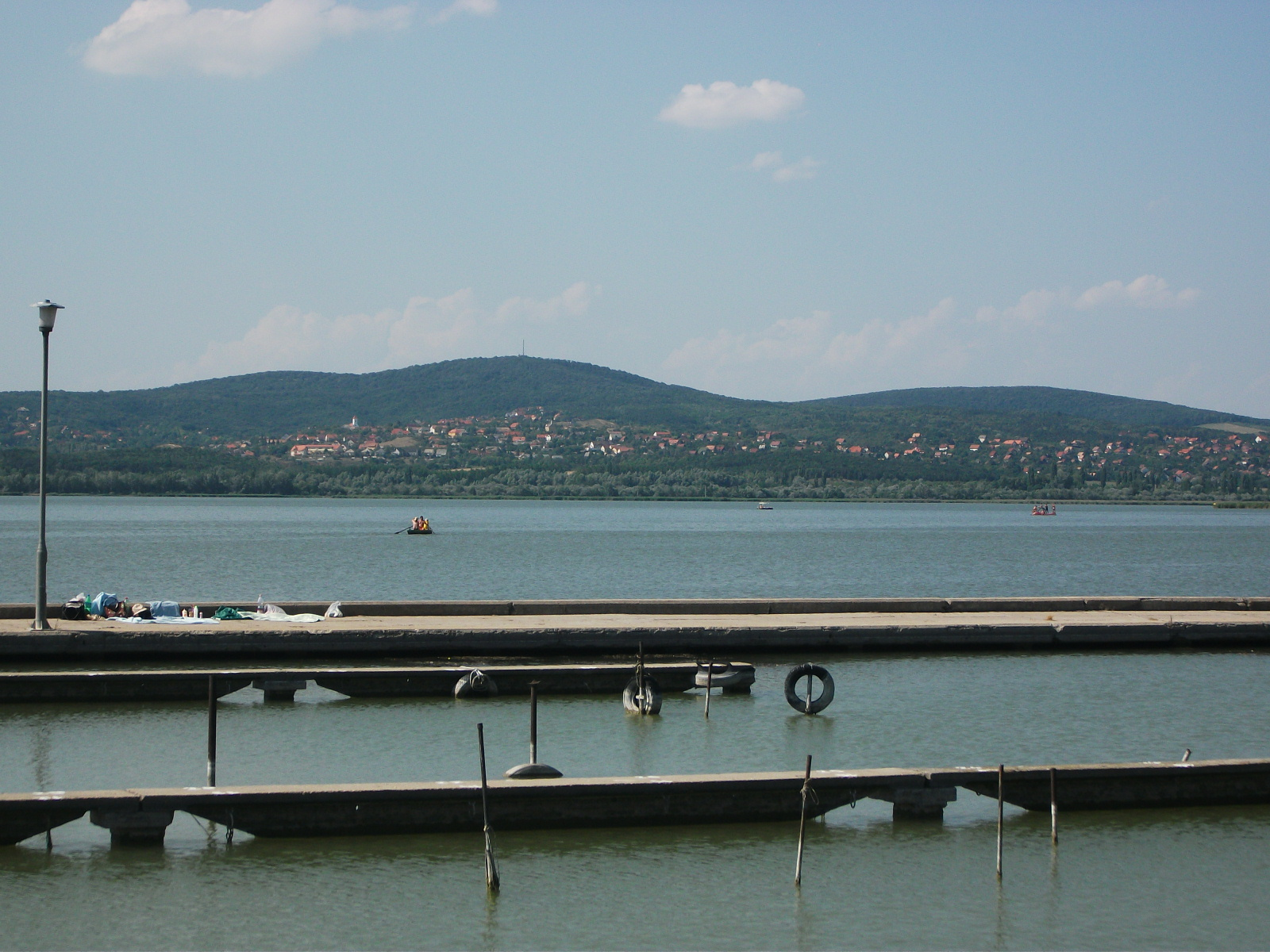

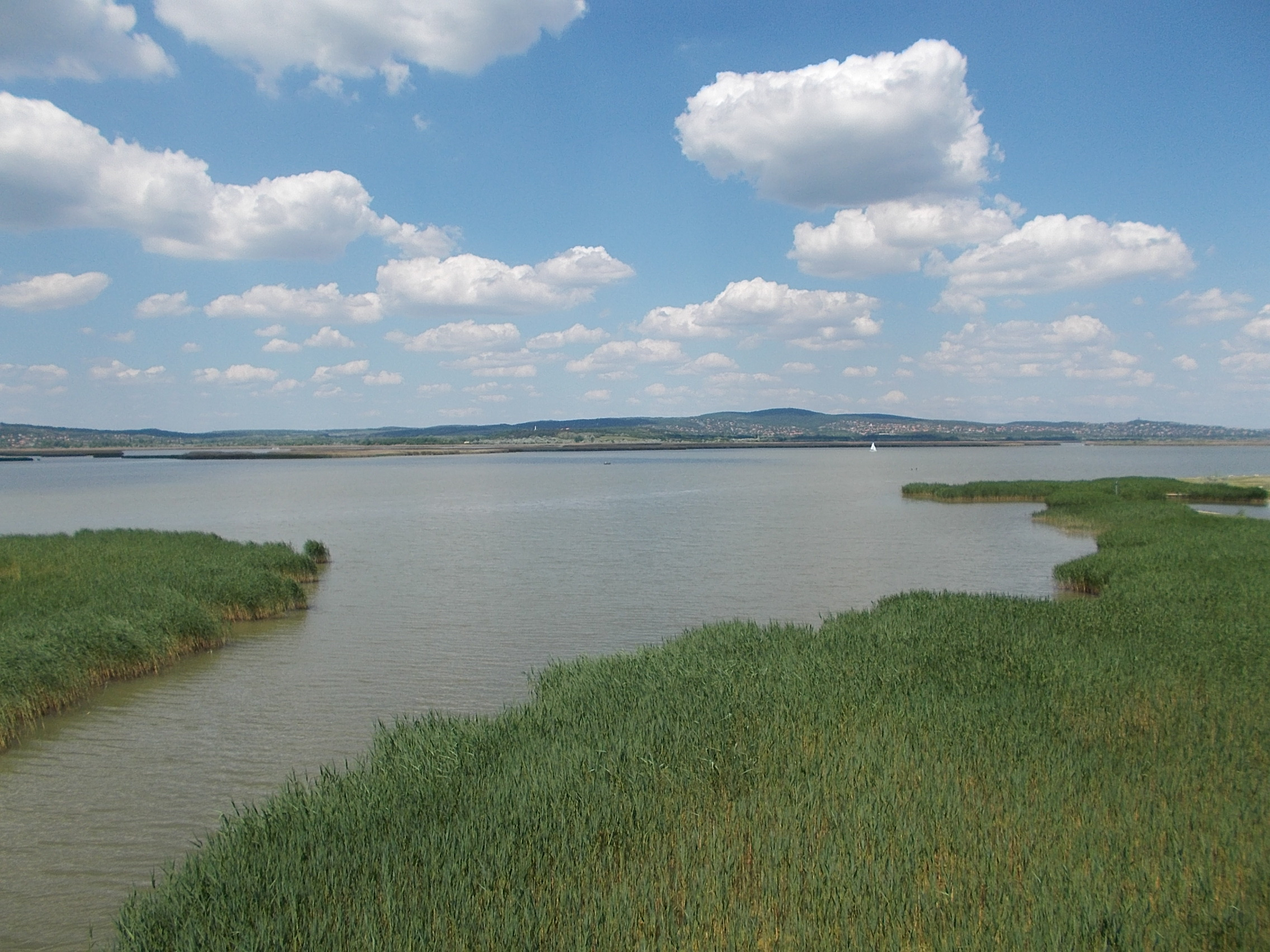

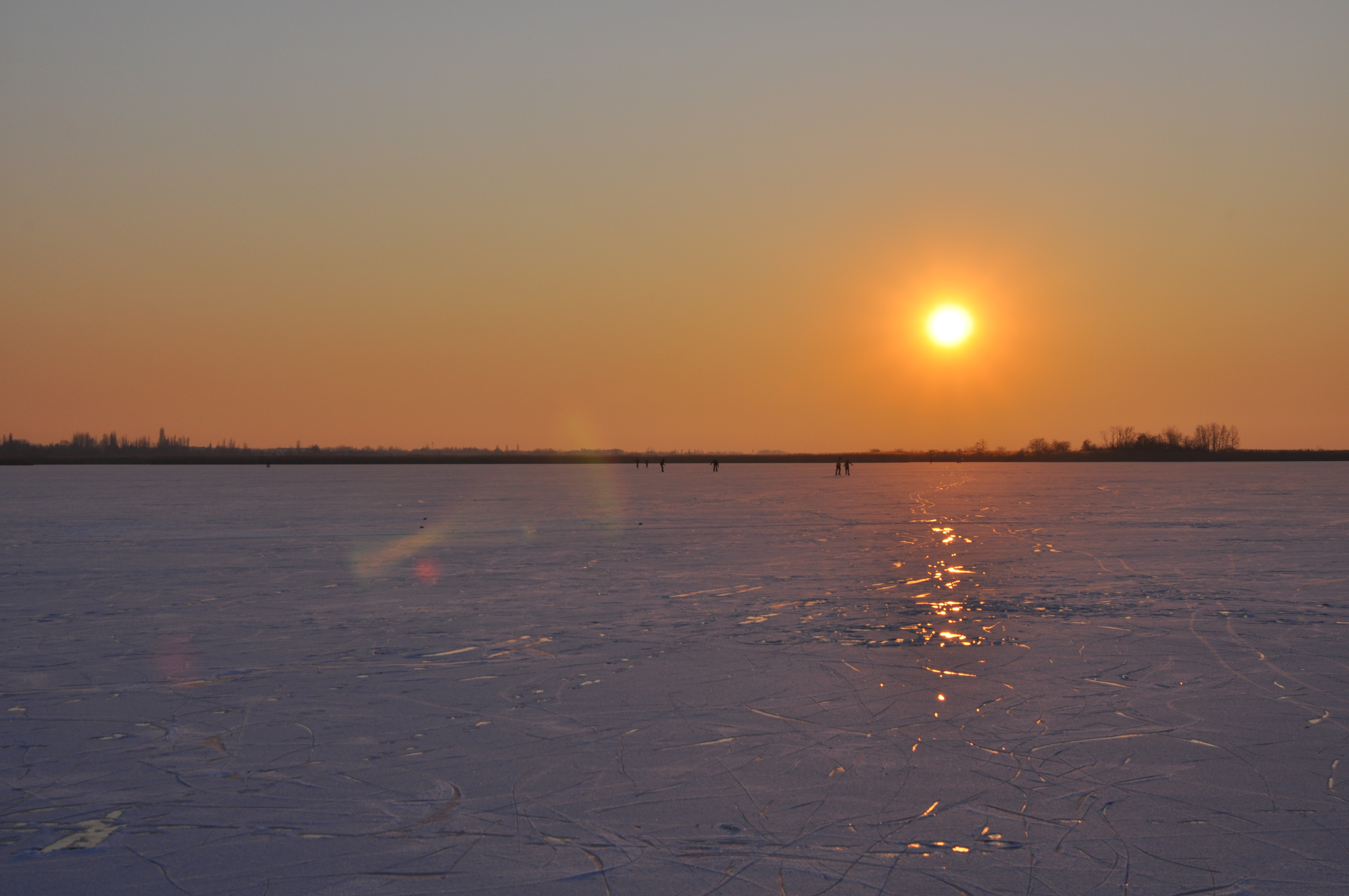

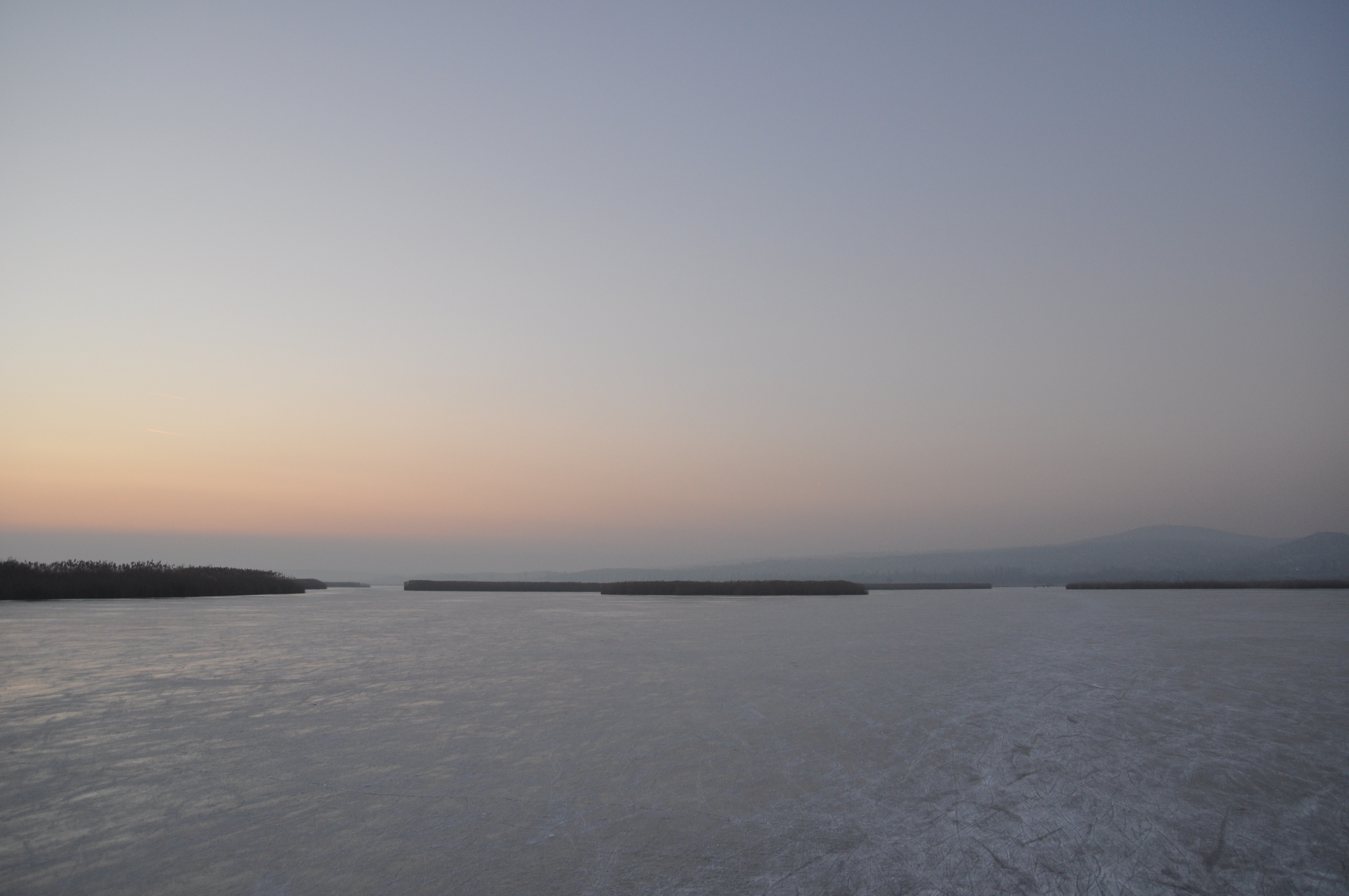

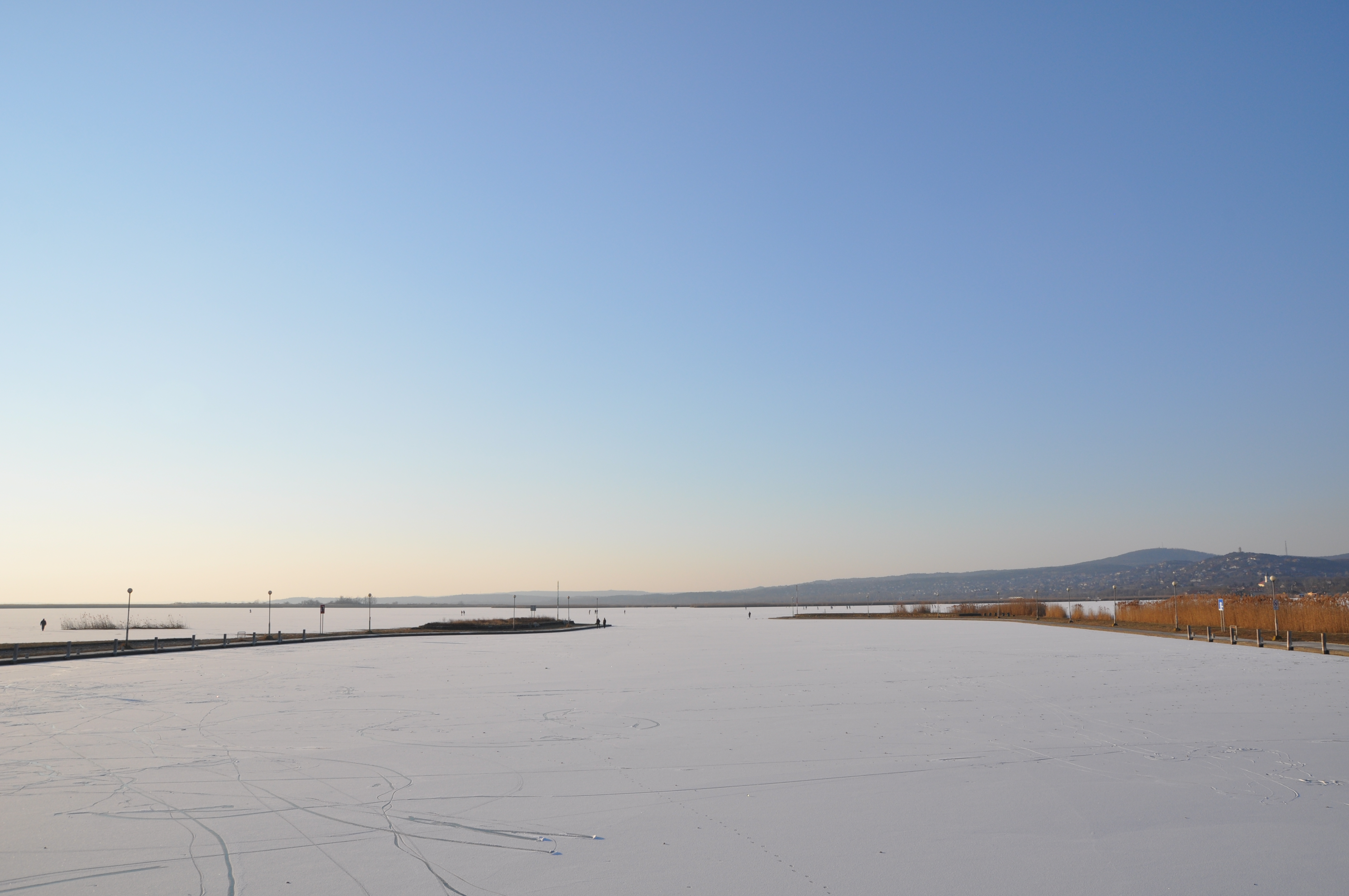

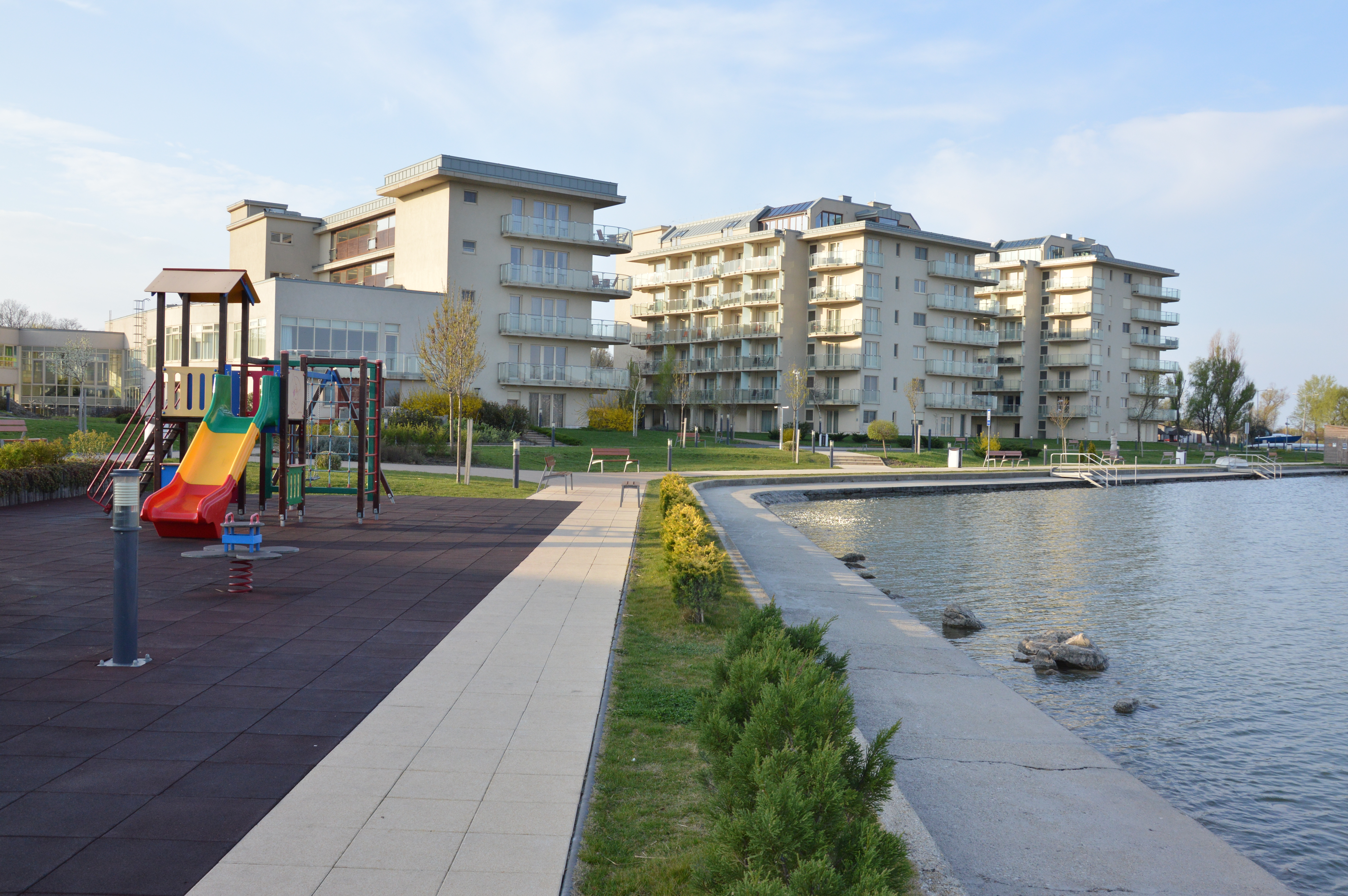

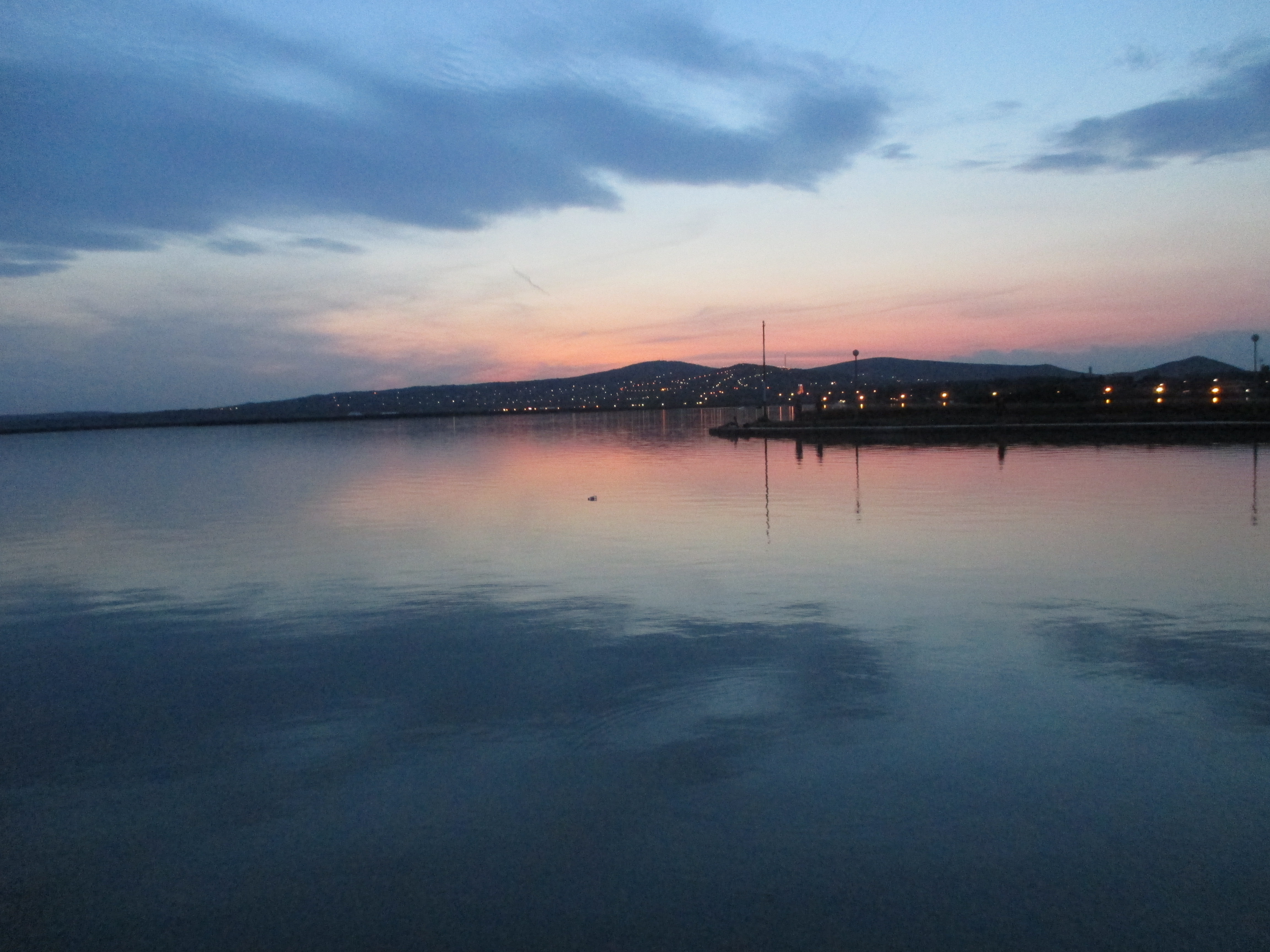

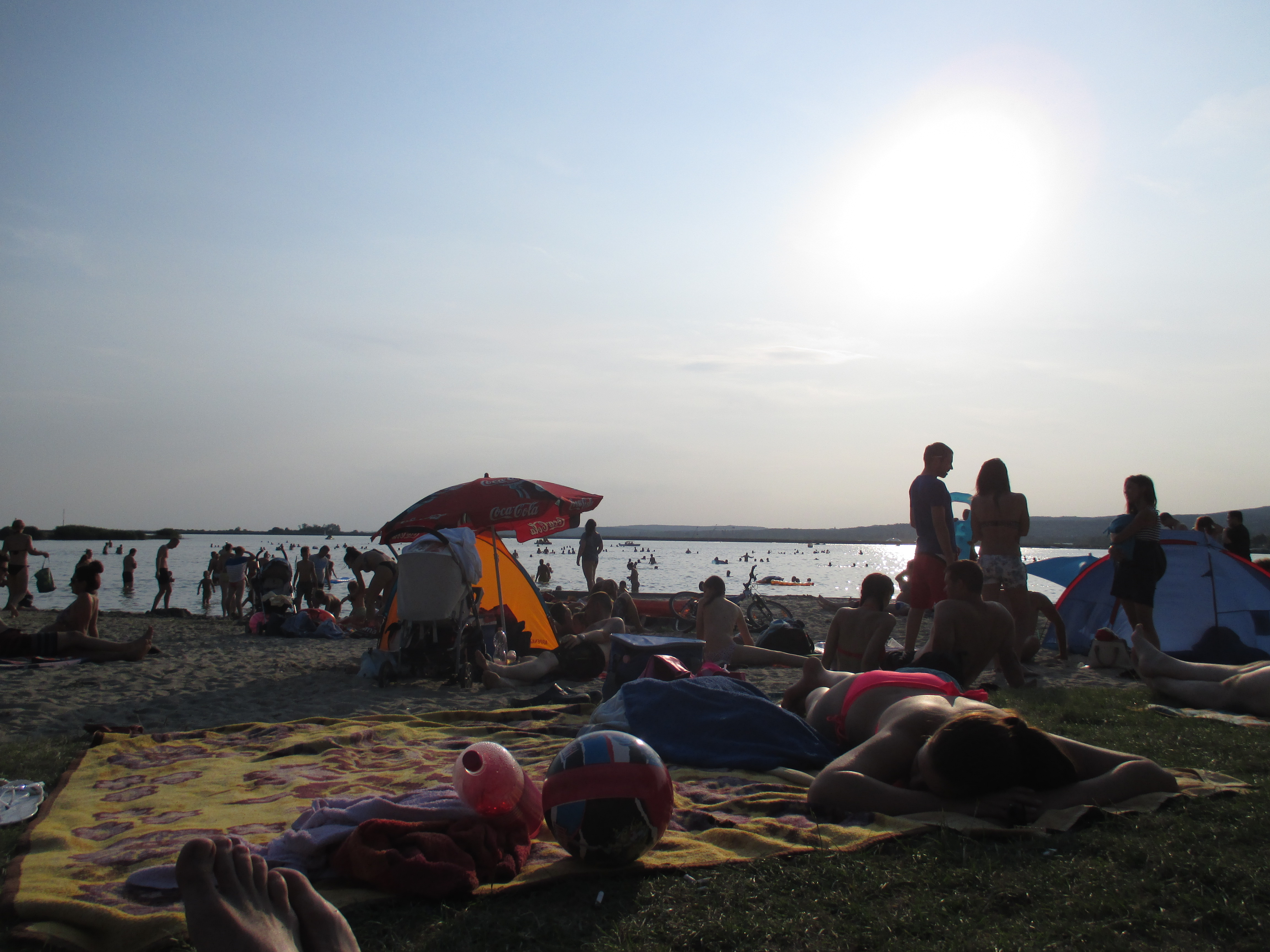

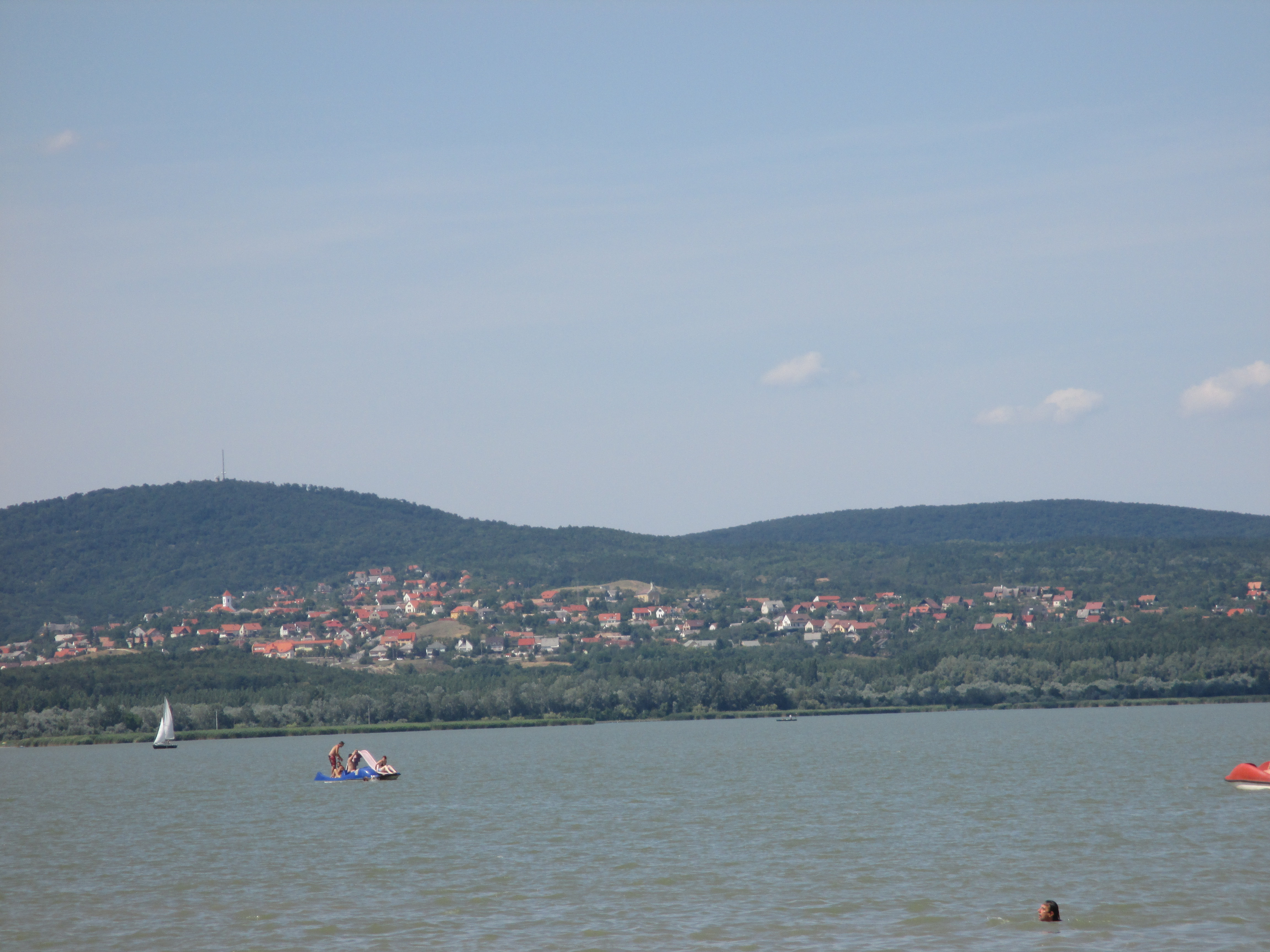

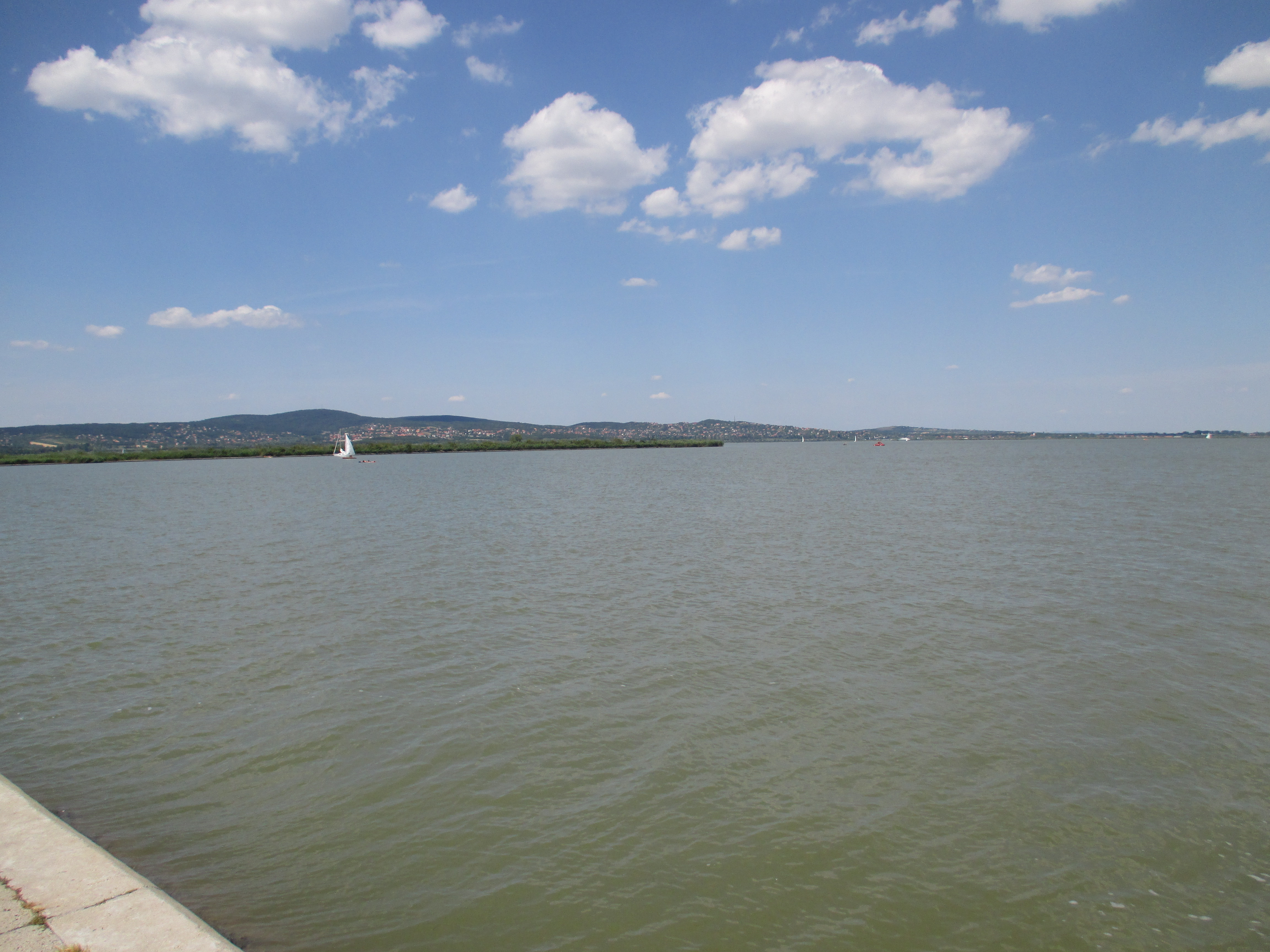
