= Velence =

- Town
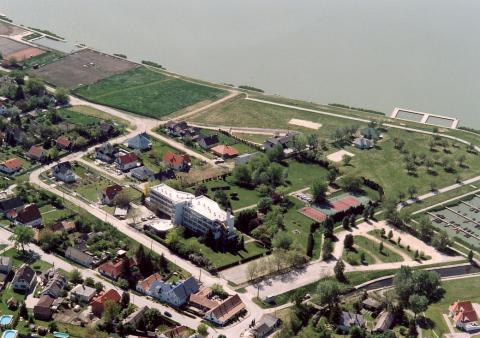
- Aerial view

- Flag Coat of arms

- Location of Velence
- Coordinates: 47.24177°N 18.64790°E
- Country: Hungary
- County: Fejér
- District: Gárdony

Area
  - Total: 33.37 km^{2} (12.88 sq mi)

Population (2017)
  - Total: 5,739
  - Density: 172.0/km^{2} (445.4/sq mi)
- Time zone: UTC+1 (CET)
  - Summer (DST): UTC+2 (CEST)
- Postal code: 2481
- Area code: (+36) 22
- Motorways: M7
- Distance from Budapest: 47.4 km (29.5 mi) Northeast
- Website: www.velence.hu

Velence is a town in the county of Fejér, Hungary, on the shore of Lake Velence.

Its name is the same in Hungarian as that of the Italian city of Venice, though they are suffixed differently: "in Velence" is Velencén, while Velencében refers to the Italian city (Magyar Angol Nagyszótár, Akadémiai Kiadó. See Hungarian grammar for details).

== Notable people ==
- Alajos Hauszmann (1847–1926), architect, professor, member of the Hungarian Academy of Sciences
- Klára Somogyi (1913–1996), tennis player
- Péter Kun (1967–1993), hard rock guitarist
- Zsolt Szekeres (born 1975), football player
- Anita Kulcsár (1976–2005), handball player
