= Nadap =

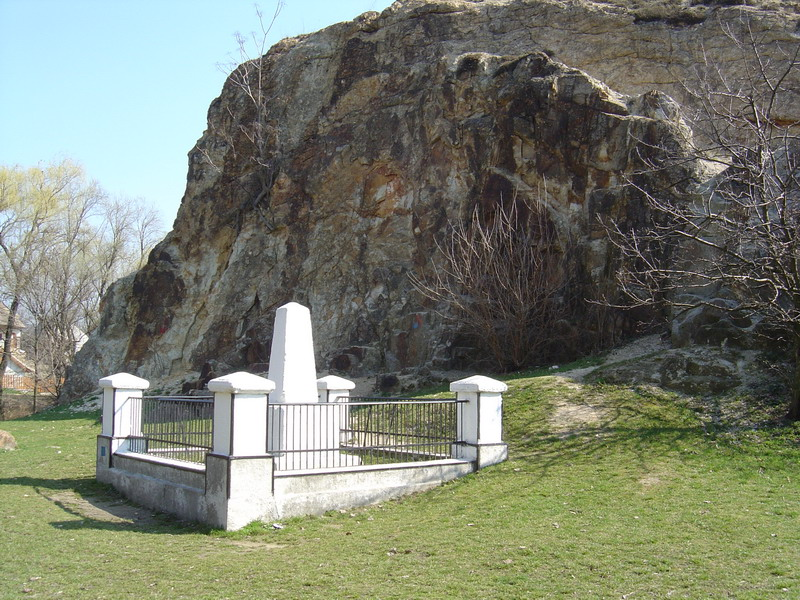
- Ancient mark of Nadap

- Coat of arms

- Location of Fejér county in Hungary

- Location of Nadap
- Coordinates: 47.25885°N 18.61661°E
- Country: Hungary
- County: Fejér

Area
  - Total: 6.93 km^{2} (2.68 sq mi)

Population (2004)
  - Total: 460
  - Density: 66.37/km^{2} (171.9/sq mi)
- Time zone: UTC+1 (CET)
  - Summer (DST): UTC+2 (CEST)
- Postal code: 8097
- Area code: 22
- Motorways: M7
- Distance from Budapest: 47.1 km (29.3 mi) Northeast
- Website: www.nadap.hu

Nadap is a village in Fejér county in central Hungary, with population of 460. Lying among low Velence Hills, it is the point of departure for sightseeing tours on the countryside. The obelisk in the vicinity, called "ancient mark of Nadap" serves as a geodetic point of reference at elevation of 173.8 m. Mihály Vörösmarty was christened in the Catholic church of Saint Rosalia in the village, and the christening basin is still preserved in the church.

== Gallery ==
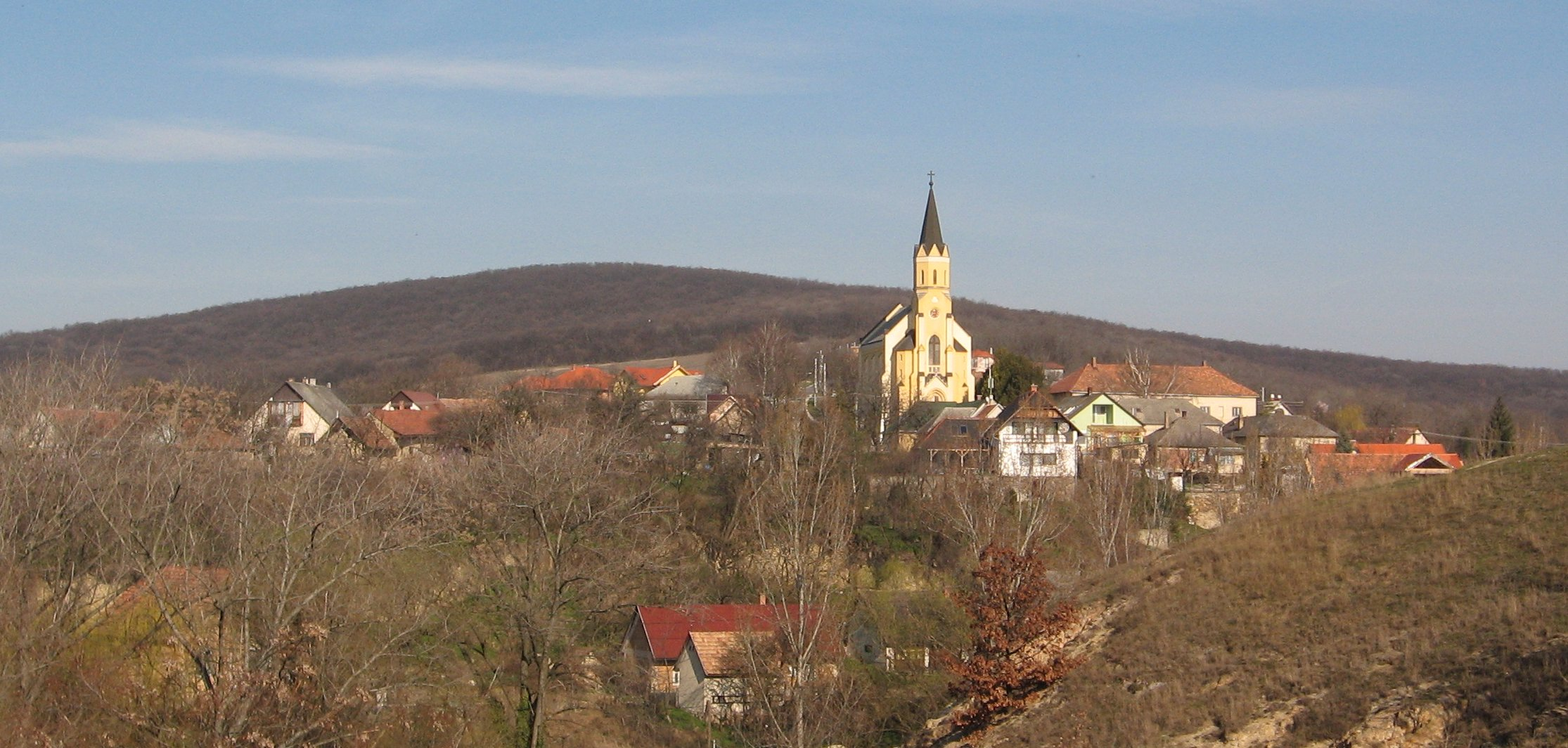
View to Nadap church and Velence Hills

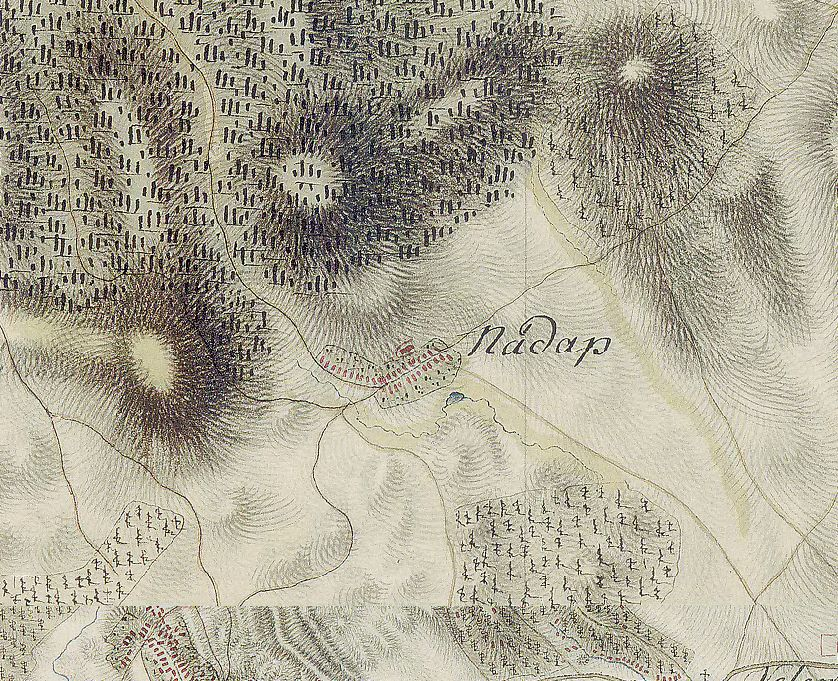
The map of Nadap from the First Military Mapping Survey of Austria Empire.

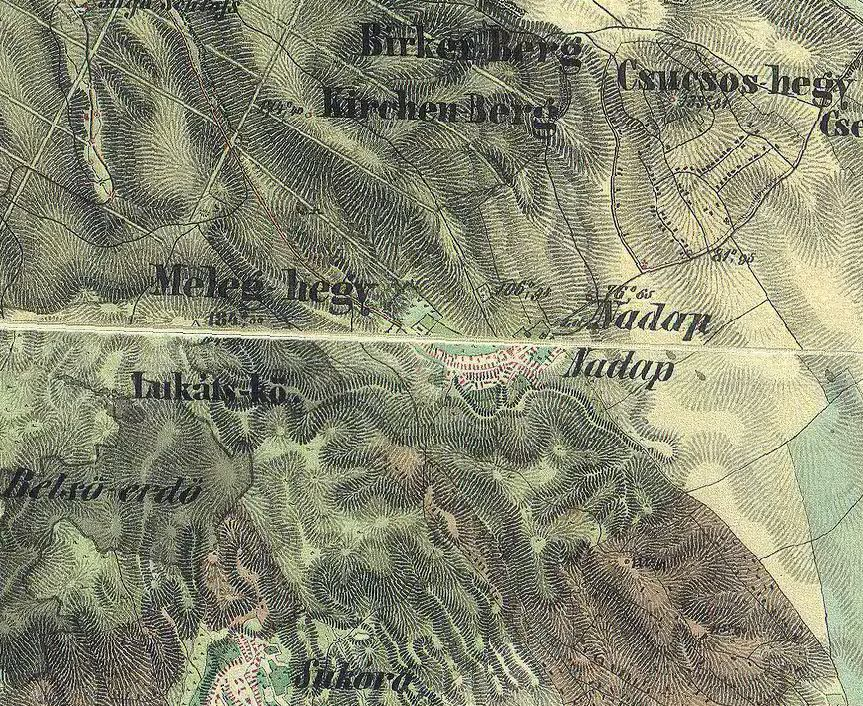
The map of Nadap from the Second Military Mapping Survey of Austria Empire.

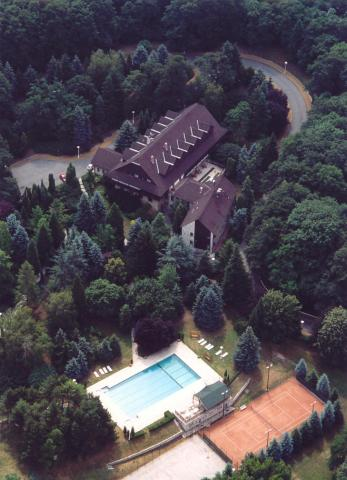
Aerial view of Nadap
