= Velence Hills =

Mountain range in Central Hungary

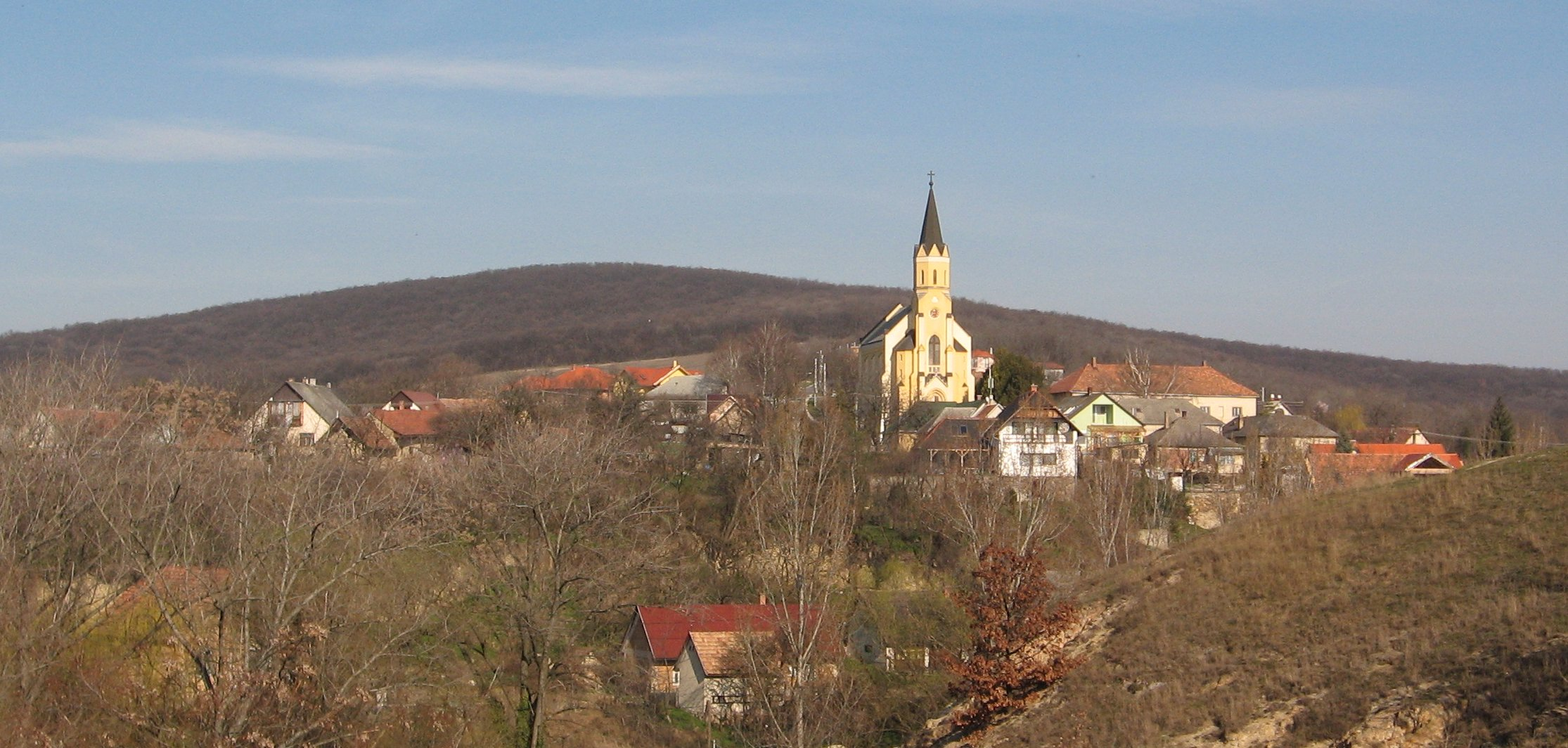
- Nadap on the Velence Hills

Highest point
- Peak: Meleg-hegy, 47.259038°N 18.596496°E
- Elevation: 352 m (1,155 ft)

Geography
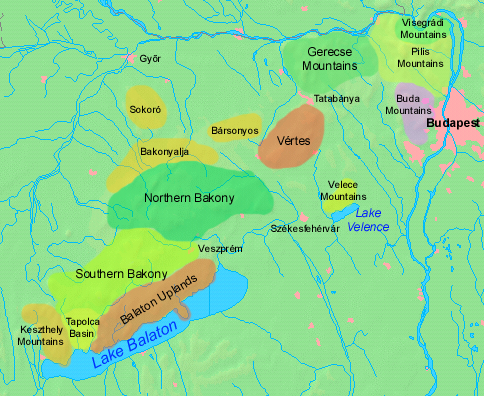
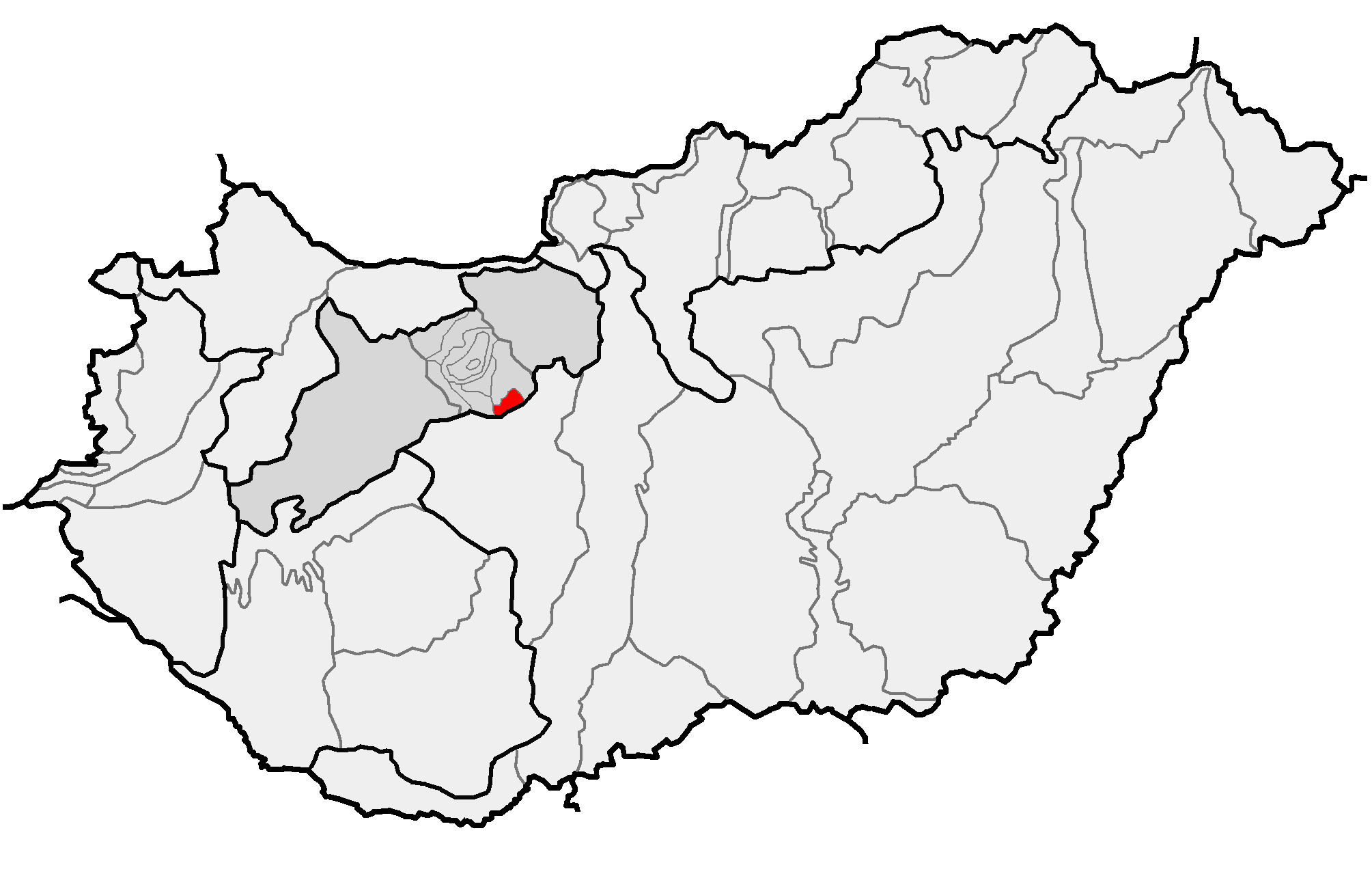
- Location of Velence Hills within physical subdivisions of Hungary
- Country: Hungary
- County: Fejér County

Geology
- Orogeny: Transdanubian Mountains

Velence Hills (Hungarian: Velencei-hegység) is a low mountain range in north-western Hungary, in the Central Transdanubian region. It lies to the north of Lake Velence, some 15 km to the east of city of Székesfehérvár. The Velence Hills are part of the Transdanubian Mountains. Village of Nadap lies in the central part of the hills and is the point of departure of excursions to the countryside. The highest point, Meleg-hegy ("Hot hill") (352 m) lies above the village.

== Gallery ==
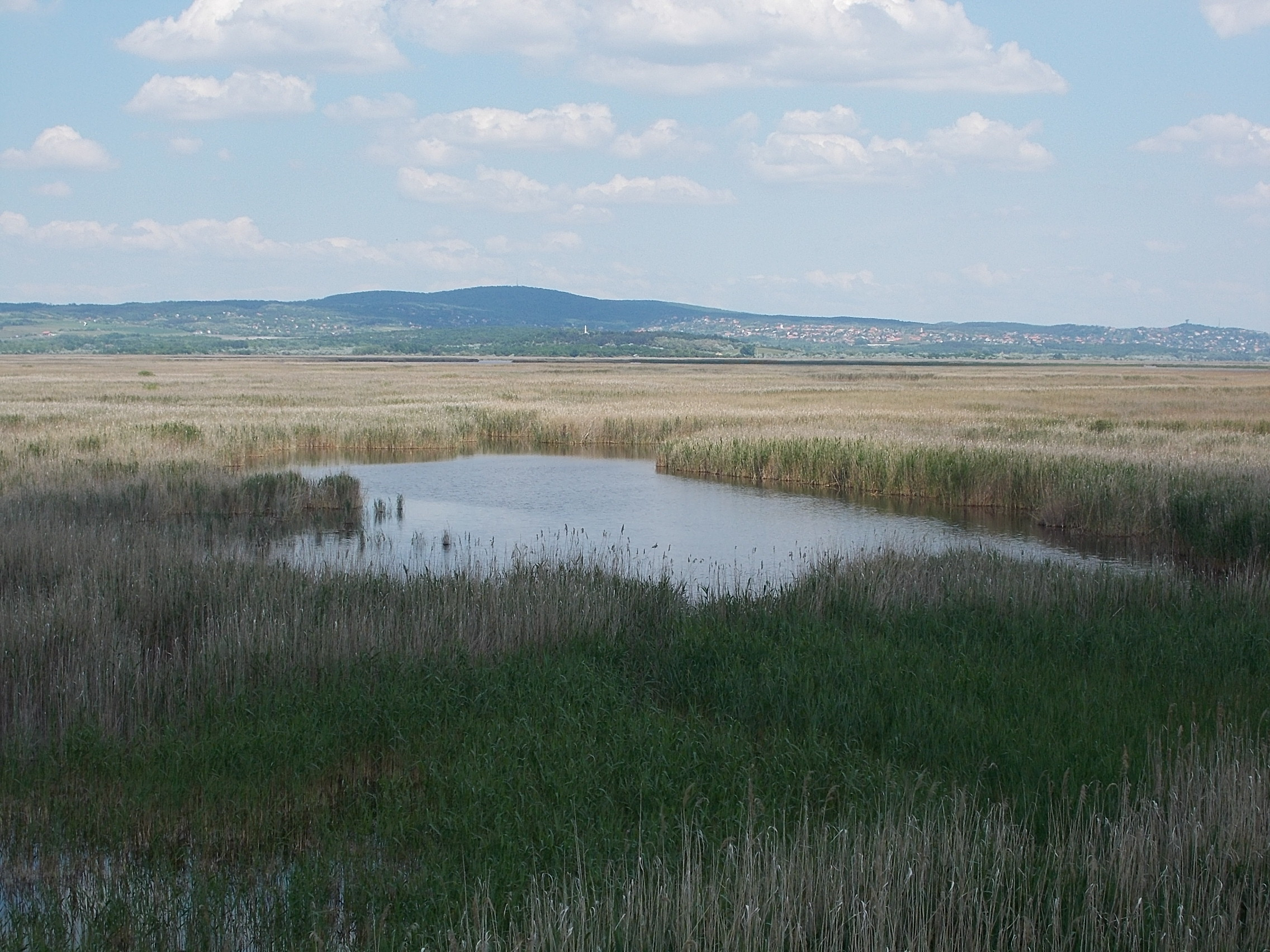

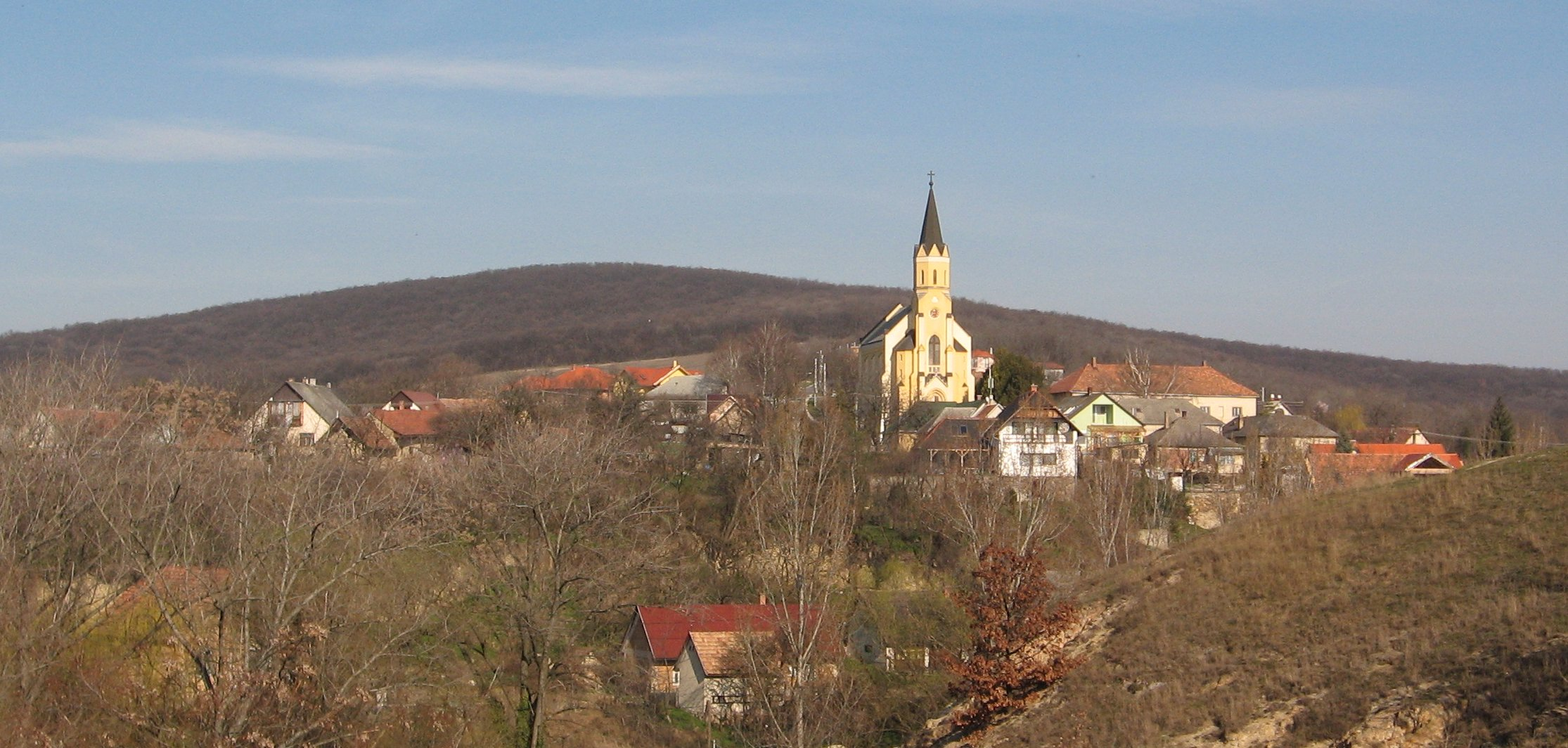

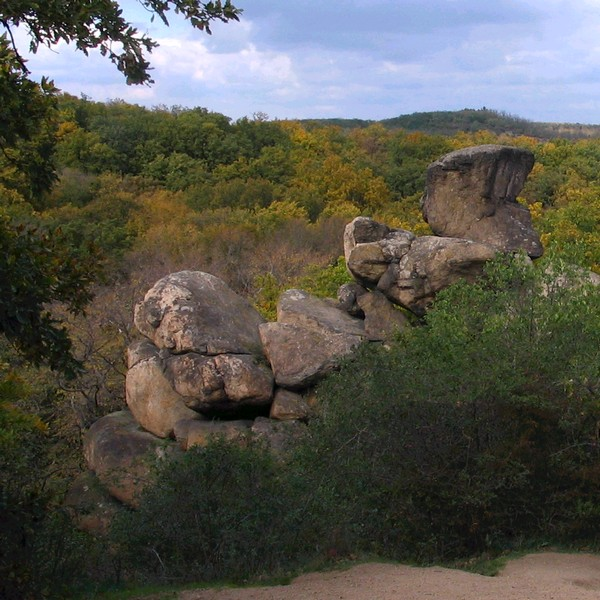
