= M6 motorway (Hungary) =

Road in Hungary

M6 motorway
- M6-os autópálya
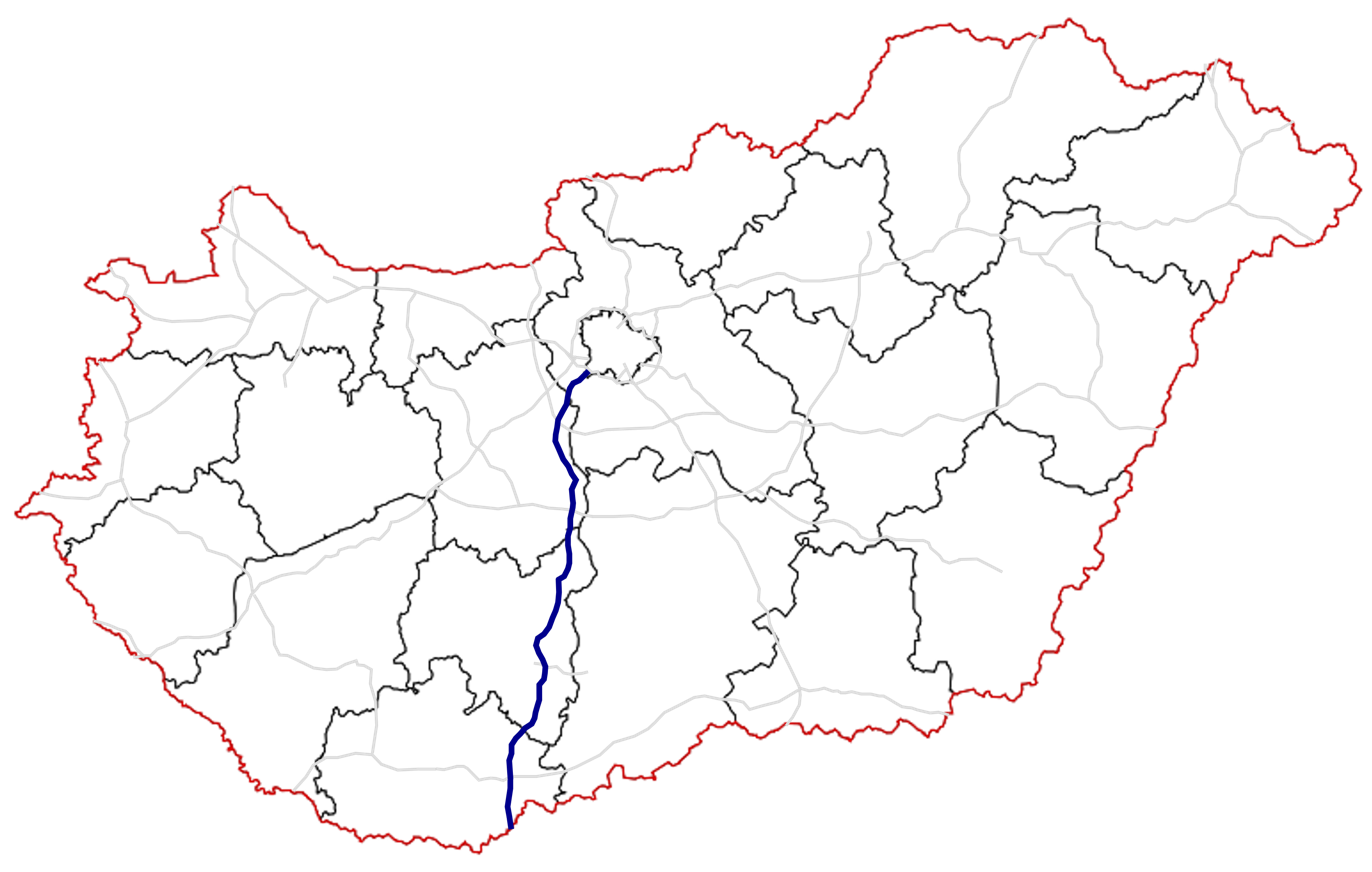
- in use under construction other highways

Route information
- Part of E73
- Length: 212 km (132 mi) 212 km (132 mi) planned

Major junctions
- North end: M0 in Budapest
- M8 near Dunaújváros; M9 near Szekszárd; M60 near Bóly
- North end: Ivándárda

Location
- Country: Hungary
- Counties: Pest, Fejér, Tolna, Baranya
- Major cities: Budapest, Érd, Dunaújváros, Paks, Szekszárd, Mohács

Highway system
- Roads in Hungary; Highways; Main roads; Local roads

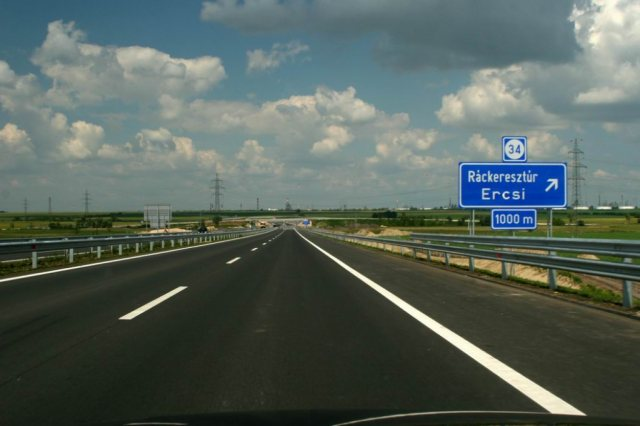
M6 near Ráckeresztúr

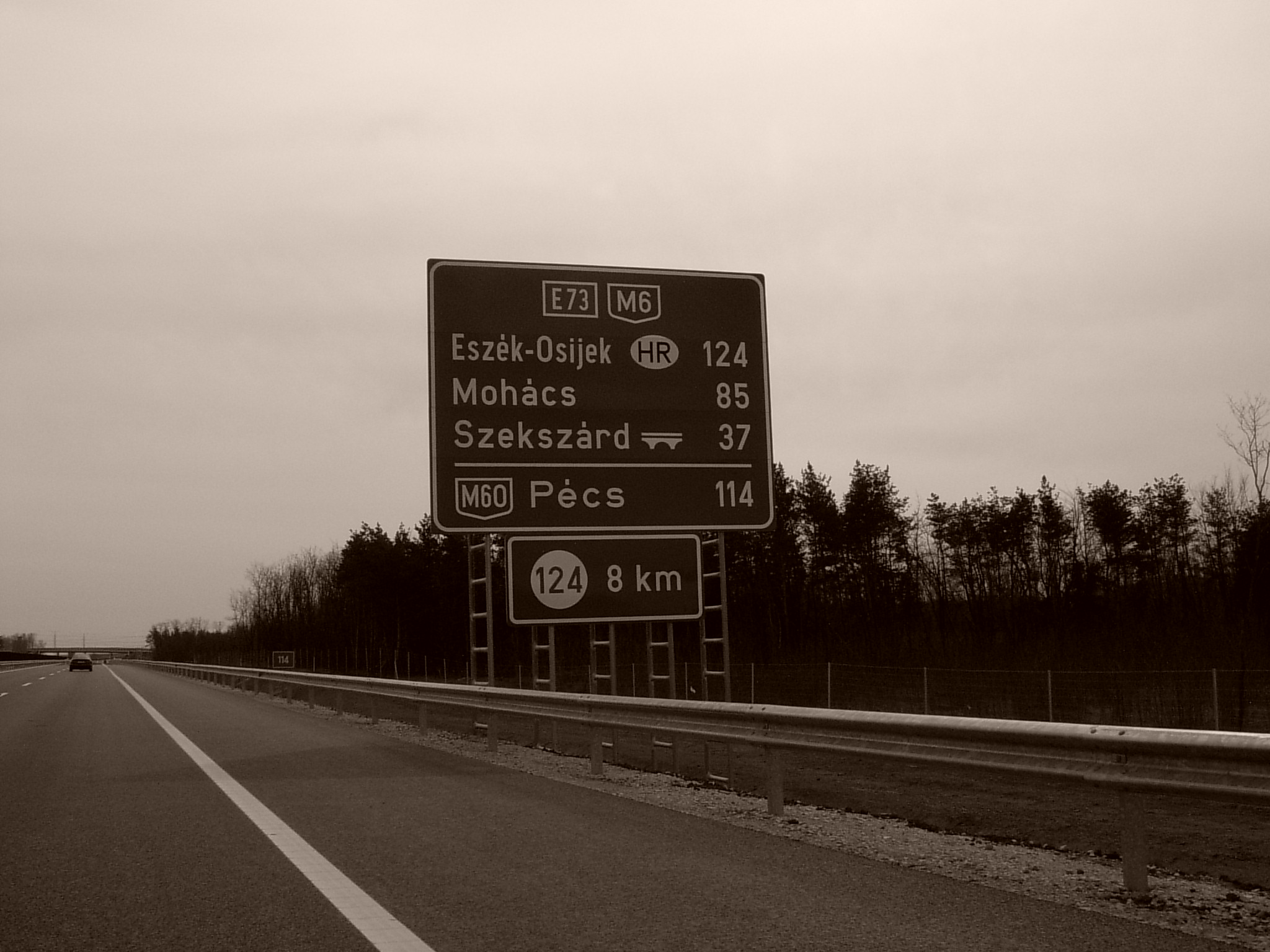
M6 124km

The M6 motorway (Hungarian: M6-os autópálya) is a north-south motorway in Hungary running along the Danube connecting Budapest to Mohács, and the section further south to the Croatian border is under construction. It is part of European route E73.

The southernmost Bóly - Ivándárda (border crossing with Croatia) section was completed in October 2025. The connecting segment of the A5 in Croatia was also completed on October 6, 2025 .

== Municipalities ==
The M6 motorway runs through the following municipalities:

- Budapest, Érd, Százhalombatta
- Ercsi, Ráckeresztúr, Besnyő, Beloiannisz, Iváncsa, Adony, Kulcs, Rácalmás, Dunaújváros, Baracs, Daruszentmiklós, Előszállás
- Dunaföldvár, Bölcske, Paks, Dunaszentgyörgy, Fadd, Tengelic, Tolna, Fácánkert, Szedres, Szekszárd, Őcsény, Decs, Sárpilis, Várdomb, Alsónyék, Bátaszék
- Véménd, Palotabozsok, Szebény, Szűr, Himesháza, Székelyszabar, Kisnyárád, Lánycsók, Babarc

== Openings timeline ==
- Budapest; M0 – Érdi-tető (7 km): 2008.09.23.
- Érdi-tető – Dunaújváros; M8 (68 km): 2006.06.11.
- Dunaújváros; M8 – Bóly; M60 (118 km): 2010.03.31.

== Junctions, exits and rest areas ==
- Distance from Zero Kilometre Stone (Adam Clark Square) in Budapest in kilometres.

	km	Destinations	Route	Notes
M0 (Budapest) – Ivándárda (212 km)
Interchange	15 km	Győr, Nagykanizsa / Szeged, Nyíregyháza; Budapest International Airport	M0 expressway (Hungary)	Budapest bypass
Exit	18 km	Érd east / Budapest-Nagytétény		
Exit	20 km	Érd-Ófalu		
Exit	22 km	Érdi-tető		
Exit	25 km	Százhalombatta north		
Exit	29 km	Százhalombatta south		
Border of Pest and Fejér Counties
Rest area	31 km	Keresztúri rest area		MOL +
Exit	34 km	Ráckeresztúr, Martonvásár / Ercsi	6204	
Rest area	40 km	Fácános rest area		
Exit	45 km	Besenyő, Pusztaszabolcs / Beloiannisz	6205	
Exit	50 km	Iváncsa / Pusztaszabolcs, Velence	6207	
Exit	55 km	Adony / Perkáta	6208	
Rest area	57 km	Szentmihályi rest area		
Exit	62 km	Kulcs, Rácalmás		
Exit	67 km	Dunaújváros north / Székesfehérvár		
Exit	70 km	Dunaújváros / Mezőfalva, Sárbogárd	6219	
Rest area	71 km	Újvárosi rest area		OMV / OMV +
Interchange	75 km	Dunaújváros south, Szolnok / Szentgotthárd	M8 expressway (Hungary)	M8 turns toward -> Szolnok or (Austria)
Exit	83 km	Dunaföldvár north / Daruszentmiklós, Seregélyes	6228	
Exit	87 km	Dunaföldvár, Solt / Előszállás, Nagykanizsa		
Border of Fejér and Tolna Counties
Rest area	92 km	Dunaföldvári rest area		
Exit	98 km	Dunaföldvár south, Paks north (Gabonásvölgy junction)		
Bridge		Gyűrűs-árok		
Bridge		Vörösmalmi-árok		
Exit	106 km	Paks / Németkér, Cece	6231	
Rest area	108 km	Paksi rest area		Mobil Petrol / Mobil Petrol +
Exit	114 km	Paks south	6232	
Rest area	120 km	Szentgyörgyi rest area		
Exit	124 km	Tengelic / Dunaszentgyörgy, Fadd	6234	
Exit	131 km	Szedres	631	
Rest area	134 km	Fácánkerti rest area		MOL / MOL +
Exit	138 km	Tolna		
Interchange	142 km	Szombathely, Nagykanizsa, Kaposvár / Szeged	M9 motorway (Hungary)	M9 turns toward -> Szombathely or Szeged
Bridge	142 km	Sió River		
Exit	147 km	Szekszárd Centrum	5113	
Exit	151 km	Szekszárd south / Őcsény	5114	
Rest area	155 km	Szentgyörgyi rest area		
Exit	164 km	Bonyhád / Bátaszék, Baja		
Rest area	165 km	Geresdi rest area		OMV / OMV +
Tunnel	167-68 km	Bátaszék Tunnel "A"		Tunnel - 1331 m
Viaduct	169 km	Belső-réti patak Viaduct		Bridge - 280 m
Tunnel	169 km	Geresd Tunnel "B"		Tunnel - 399 m
Viaduct	170 km	Belső-réti patak Viaduct		Bridge - 313 m
Border of Tolna and Baranya Counties
Tunnel	170-71 km	Baranya Tunnel "C"		Tunnel - 865 m
Tunnel	172 km	Véménd Tunnel "D"		Tunnel - 418 m
Viaduct	173 km	Palotabozsoki-vízfolyás Viaduct		Bridge - 481 m
Exit	173 km	Véménd, Pécsvárad / Palotabozsok, Somberek	5606	
Viaduct		Szebény Viaduct		Bridge - 830 m
Rest area	181 km	Szebényi rest area		
Viaduct		Csele patak Viaduct		Bridge - 450 m
Viaduct		Himesházai-árok Viaduct		Bridge - 491 m
Exit	191 km	Lánycsók, Mohács / Babarc		
Interchange	193 km	Pécs, Barcs	M60 motorway (Hungary)	M60 turns toward -> (Croatia)

Signs	Distance	Destinations	Note
	(196 km)	Nagynyárád, Bóly - East	
	(210 km)	Ivándárda, Kislippó	
Europe	(212 km)	Ivándárda / Branjin Vrh border crossing	
A5 (Croatia) European route E73		Osijek, Croatia	

== Toll ==
From February 1, 2015, the M6 motorway is a toll-road. The motorway can be used with the national sticker or with the following county stickers:

Type of vignette	Available section
Pest County	between M0 expressway junction and Ráckeresztúr (15 km – 34 km)
Fejér County	between Százhalombatta north and Paks north (25 km – 98 km)
Tolna County	between M8 motorway junction and Pécsvárad (Somberek) (75 km – 173 km)
Baranya County	between Bátaszék and Bóly west (163 km – 191 km)

== Significant structures ==
From Budapest to the Croatian border, the M6 motorway features the following bridges, tunnels or covered cuts:

Viaducts

- Belső-réti patak Viaduct (Belső-réti patak völgyhíd I.; 280 m or 920 ft)
- Belső-réti patak Viaduct (Belső-réti patak völgyhíd II.; 313 m or 1,027 ft)
- Palotabozsoki-vízfolyás Viaduct (Palotabozsoki-vízfolyás völgyhíd; 481 m or 1,578 ft)
- Szebény Viaduct (Szebényi völgyhíd; 830 m or 2,720 ft)
- Csele patak Viaduct (Csele-patak völgyhíd; 450 m or 1,480 ft)
- Himesházai árok Viaduct (Himesházai árok völgyhíd; 491 m or 1,611 ft)

Tunnels

- Bátaszék Tunnel (Bátaszék alagút "A"; 1,331 m or 4,367 ft) – Longest tunnel in Hungary
- Geresd Tunnel (Geresd alagút "B"; 399 m or 1,309 ft)
- Baranya Tunnel (Baranya alagút "C"; 865 m or 2,838 ft)
- Véménd Tunnel (Véménd alagút "D"; 418 m or 1,371 ft)

== European Route ==
Name	Route
	197 km	junction (15) – (Croatia) Autocesta A5

== See also ==
- Roads in Hungary
- Transport in Hungary
- International E-road network
