= Adony Subregion =

Subregion in Fejér County, Hungary

Coordinates: 47.1167°N 18.8667°E

Adony Subregion was a subregion in Fejér County, Hungary. Seat of the subregion was in Adony.

== Settlements ==
Adony	Beloiannisz	Besnyő	Iváncsa	Kulcs
Perkáta	Pusztaszabolcs	Szabadegyháza
