= Dunaújváros District =

Dunaújváros District Dunaújvárosi járás
- Districts of Hungary
- Coat of arms

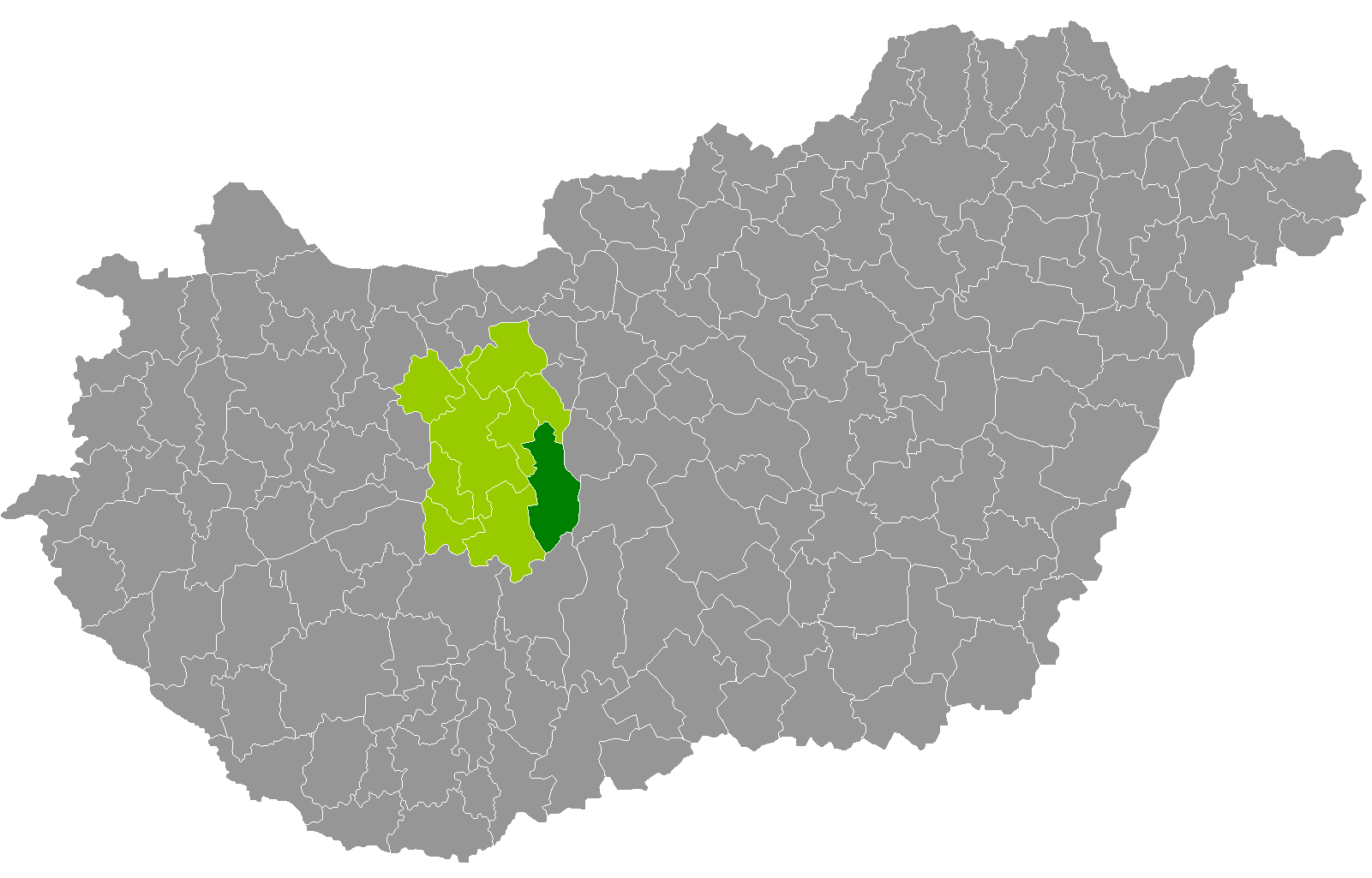
- Dunaújváros District within Hungary and Fejér County.
- Coordinates: 46.96°N 18.93°E
- Country: Hungary
- County: Fejér
- District seat: Dunaújváros

Area
  - Total: 650.05 km^{2} (250.99 sq mi)
  - Rank: 3rd in Fejér

Population (2011 census)
  - Total: 94,414
  - Rank: 2nd in Fejér
  - Density: 145/km^{2} (380/sq mi)

Dunaújváros (Hungarian: Dunaújvárosi járás) is a district in south-eastern part of Fejér County. Dunaújváros is also the name of the town where the district seat is found. The district is located in the Central Transdanubia Statistical Region.

== Geography ==
Dunaújváros District borders with Martonvásár District to the northeast, Ráckeve District (Pest County) and Kunszentmiklós District (Bács-Kiskun County) to the east, Paks District (Tolna County) to the south, Sárbogárd District, Székesfehérvár District and Gárdony District to the west. The number of the inhabited places in Dunaújváros District is 16.

== Municipalities ==
The district has 1 urban county, 3 towns, 3 large villages and 9 villages. (ordered by population, as of 1 January 2012)

- **Adony** (3,912)
- Baracs (3,484)
- Beloiannisz (1,100)
- Besnyő (1,779)
- Daruszentmiklós (1,597)
- **Dunaújváros** (48,010) – district seat
- Előszállás (2,186)
- Iváncsa (2,899)
- Kisapostag (1,414)
- Kulcs (2,728)
- Mezőfalva (4,677)
- Nagykarácsony (1,361)
- Nagyvenyim (4,051)
- Perkáta (3,942)
- **Pusztaszabolcs** (5,997)
- **Rácalmás** (4,488)

The bolded municipalities are cities, italics municipalities are large villages.

== See also ==
- List of cities and towns in Hungary
