= Fejér County 4th constituency =

Constituency in Hungary (2012-)

Fejér County 4th constituency (Dunaújváros)
- Constituency for the National Assembly
- Location of Fejér county 04 within Fejér county

- Location of Fejér county within Hungary
- County: Fejér
- Electorate: 65,896 (2022)
- Major settlements: Dunaújváros

Current constituency
- Created: 2011
- Party: Tisza Party
- Member: Ervin Nagy
- Elected: 2026

The 4th constituency of Fejér County (Hungarian: Fejér megyei 04. számú országgyűlési egyéni választókerület) is one of the single member constituencies of the National Assembly, the national legislature of Hungary. The constituency standard abbreviation: Fejér 04. OEVK.

Since 2026, it has been represented by Ervin Nagy of the Tisza Party.

== Geography ==
The 4th constituency is located in eastern part of Fejér County.

=== List of municipalities ===
The constituency includes the following municipalities:

1. Adony
2. Dunaújváros
3. Ercsi
4. Iváncsa
5. Kulcs
6. Nagyvenyim
7. Perkáta
8. Pusztaszabolcs
9. Rácalmás

== Members ==
The constituency was first represented by Dénes Galambos of the Fidesz from 2014 to 2018. In the 2018 election Tamás Pintér of the Jobbik was elected representative until the 2019 Hungarian local elections. In this election Pintér was elected the mayor of Dunaújváros. Due to the incompatibility of its representatives and the mayor's mandate, a by-election had to be announced. In the by-election of 2020 Gergely Kálló of the Jobbik was elected representative. He was succeeded by Lajos Mészáros of the Fidesz in 2022. In the 2026 election, Ervin Nagy of the Tisza Party was elected representative.

Election	Member	Party	%	Ref.
2014	Dénes Galambos	Fidesz	35.88	
2018	Tamás Pintér	Jobbik	43.53	
2020 by-election (Note: Kálló was a member of Jobbik. Supported by Opposition coalition: Jobbik–DK–LMP–MSZP-Momentum–Dialogue.)	Gergely Kálló	Jobbik	56.43	
2022	Lajos Mészáros	Fidesz	46.17	
2026	Ervin Nagy	TISZA	60.50	
