= M8 motorway (Hungary) =

Road in Hungary

M8 motorway
- M8-as autópálya
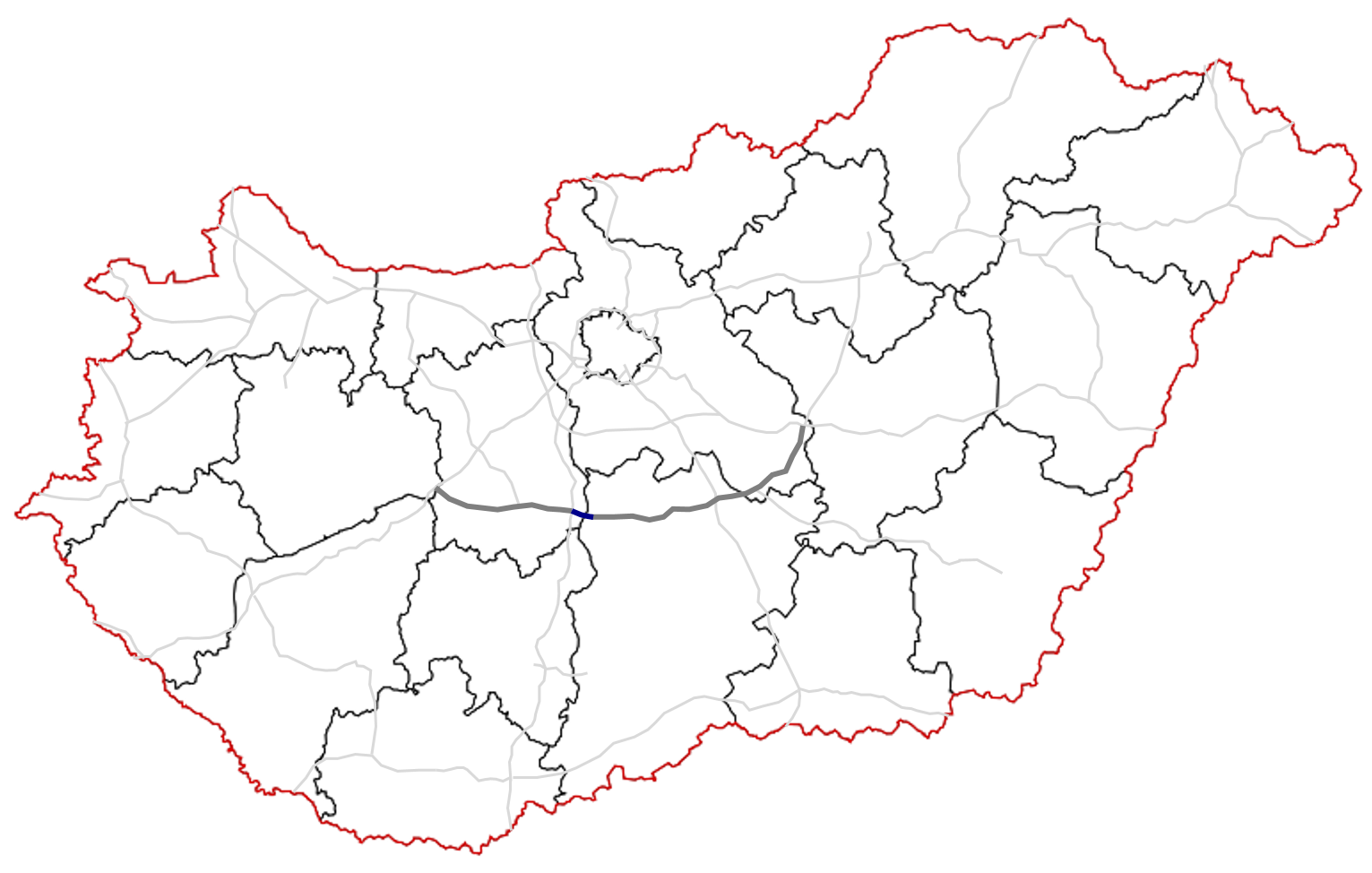

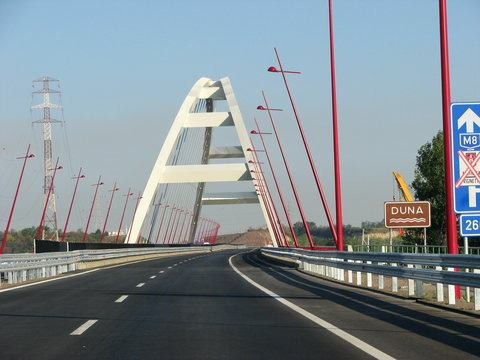
- Pentele Bridge

Route information
- Part of E66
- Length: 28.02 km (17.41 mi) 330.2 km (205.2 mi) planned

Major junctions
- From: Rábafüzes near Szentgotthárd
- M7 near Székesfehérvár M6 near Dunaújváros; M5 near Kecskemét M4 near Szolnok
- To: Szolnok

Location
- Country: Hungary
- Major cities: Veszprém, Kecskemét, Szolnok

Highway system
- Roads in Hungary; Highways; Main roads; Local roads

The M8 motorway is a planned Hungarian motorway, which will, upon completion, connect the western part of the country, near the Austrian border to Szolnok in the central part of the country. It will be partially concurrent with the European route E66 (Graz – Veszprém – Székesfehérvár).

The construction was reported to be started in 2007 (a few tiny sections were built, including the Pentele Bridge over the Danube) and it had been planned to be completed around 2015 but as of 2013 the plans were not even finalized and the even the permission phase for several smaller parts took more than 2 years.

The completed section of motorway is 8 km long, stretching from Baracs to Apostag.

== Major junctions ==
Its major junctions are with M6 (Baracs), Route 6 (Kisapostag), and Route 51 (Apostag). It crosses over the Danube river, on the Pentele Bridge.
