= Őcsény =

- Village
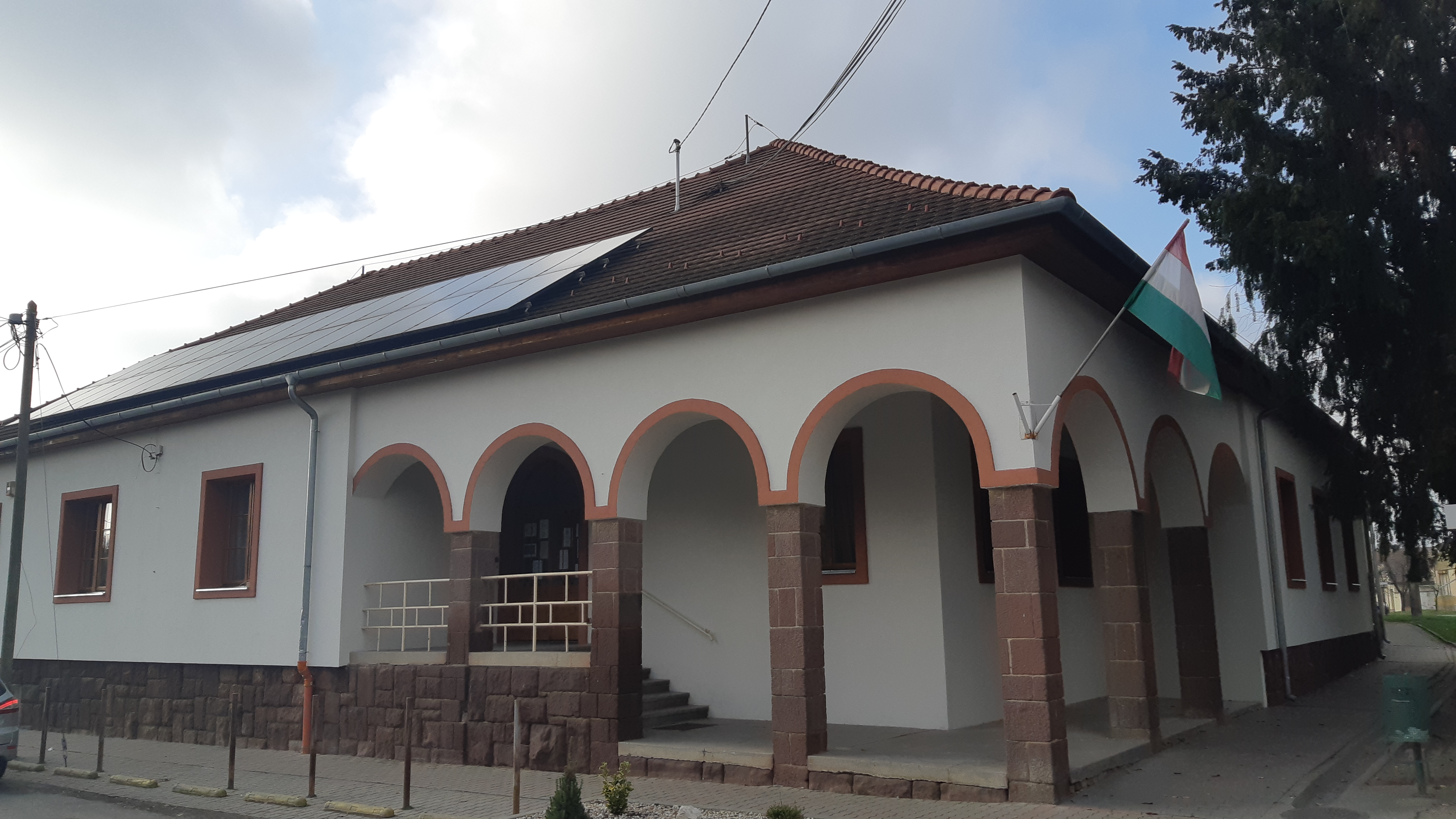
- Town hall

- Coat of arms

- Location within Hungary
- Coordinates: 46°18′45″N 18°45′28″E
- Country: Hungary
- Province: Southern Transdanubia
- County: Tolna

Government
  - Type: Mayor-Council
  - Mayor: János Fülöp (Independent)

Area
  - Total: 72.6 km^{2} (28.0 sq mi)

Population (2022)
  - Total: 2,148
  - Density: 29.6/km^{2} (76.6/sq mi)
- Time zone: UTC+1 (CET)
  - Summer (DST): UTC+2 (CEST)
- Postal code: 7143
- Area code: 74
- Website: www.ocseny.hu

Őcsény is a village in Tolna County, Hungary.

== Location ==
Őcsény is located on the southeastern edge of Tolna County, between the Gemenc forest and the Szekszárd Hills, and it's the northernmost town in the Sárköz region. The Sió river to forms its borders to the north and the Danube to the east. In terms of administrative boundaries, it is bordered by Decs to the south, the county seat Szekszárd to the west and north, Bogyiszló to the northeast, and Fajsz, Sükösd, and Érsekcsanád (which three belong to Bács-Kiskun County) to the east.

== Transport ==
Őcsény has 2 exits from the M6 motorway: Őcsény-Szekszárd East or Őcsény-Decs-Szekszárd South exits. The village can be reached via secondary roads Nr. 5113 and 5114, which are accessible from highway 56.

By train, it's accessible via MÁV Line 46 (Sárbogárd–Szekszárd–Bátaszék). The station is located between Szekszárd and Decs. The village used to be accessible from the capital via several direct trains departing from Budapest Déli station. This option was discontinued as of April 11, 2021, since the Gemenc InterRégió trains now run between Baja and Székesfehérvár; therefore, a transfer in Sárbogárd is required to reach the capital.

Some stops on the Gemenc State Forest Railway are located on the outskirts of Őcsény, but the village itself cannot be reached directly from there. Section 1 of the Alföld Blue Trail (Szekszárd–Baja) passes through the outskirts of the village but bypasses the village center.

Őcsény has the couty's only airfield, which is the largest grass-covered airfield in Hungary. It's used for sport aviation, and the facility hosts often national and international events.An EASA Flight School operates at the airfield.

== Gallery ==
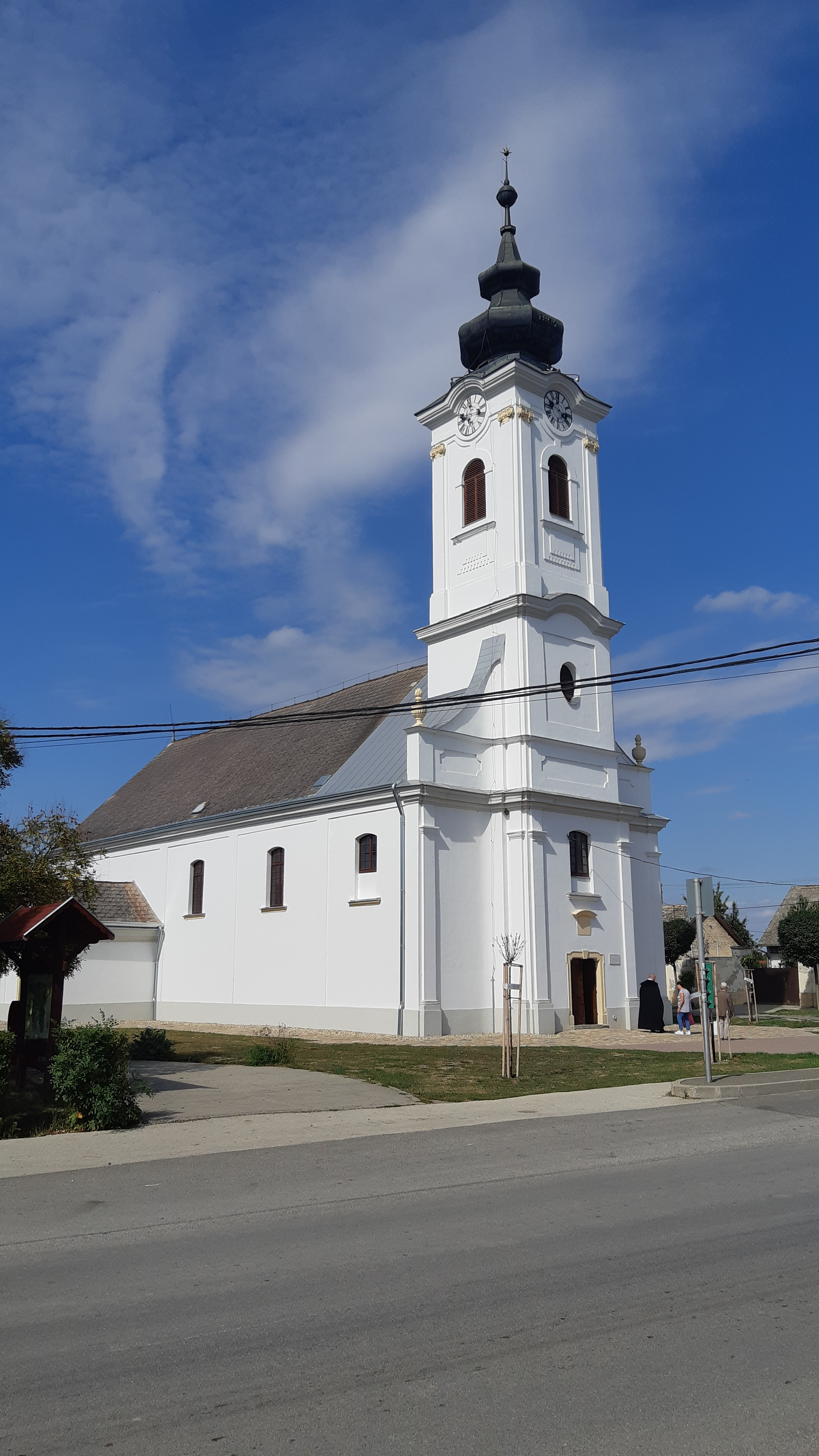
Calvinist church from 18th century

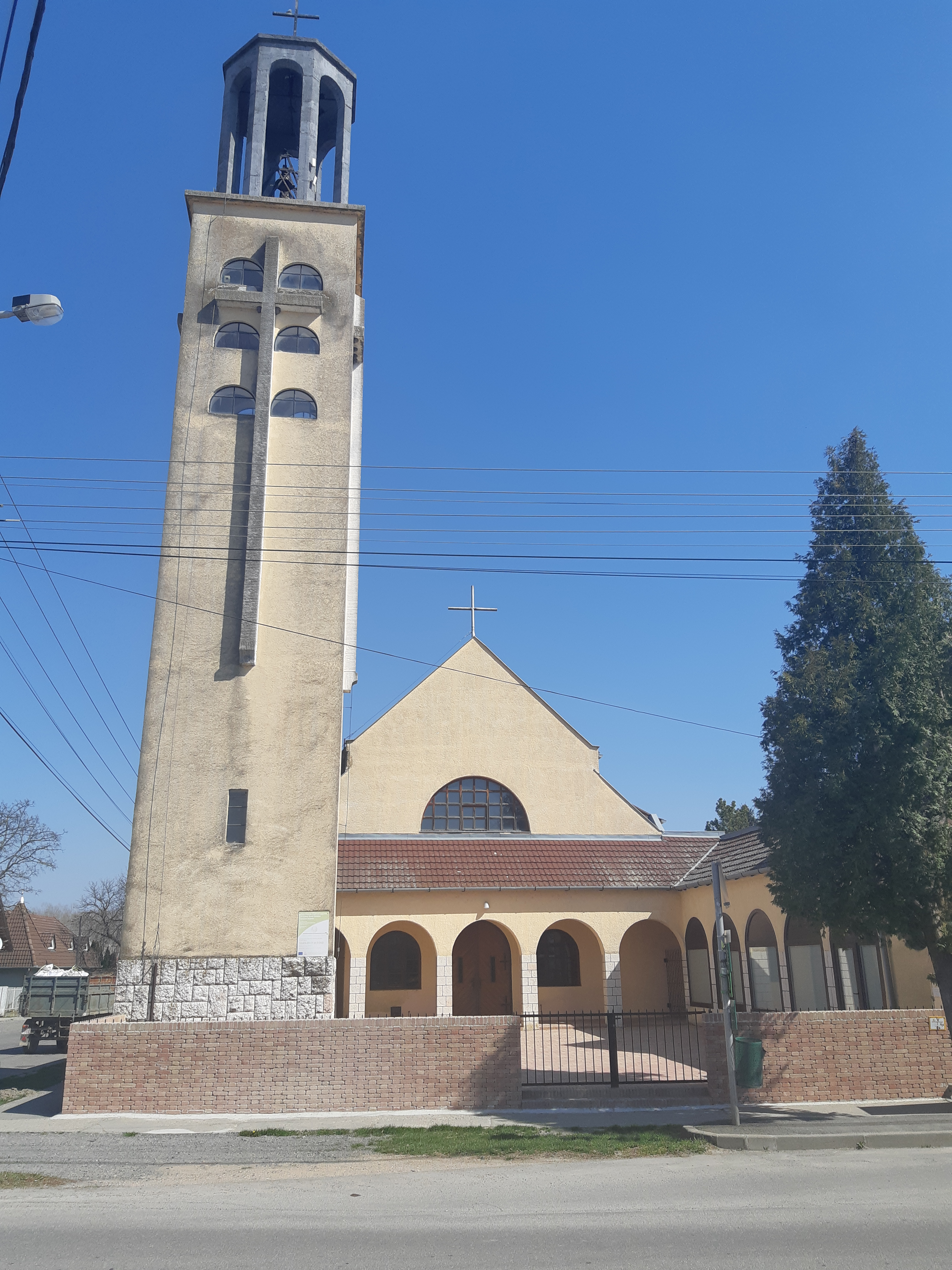
Roman catholic church from 1940's

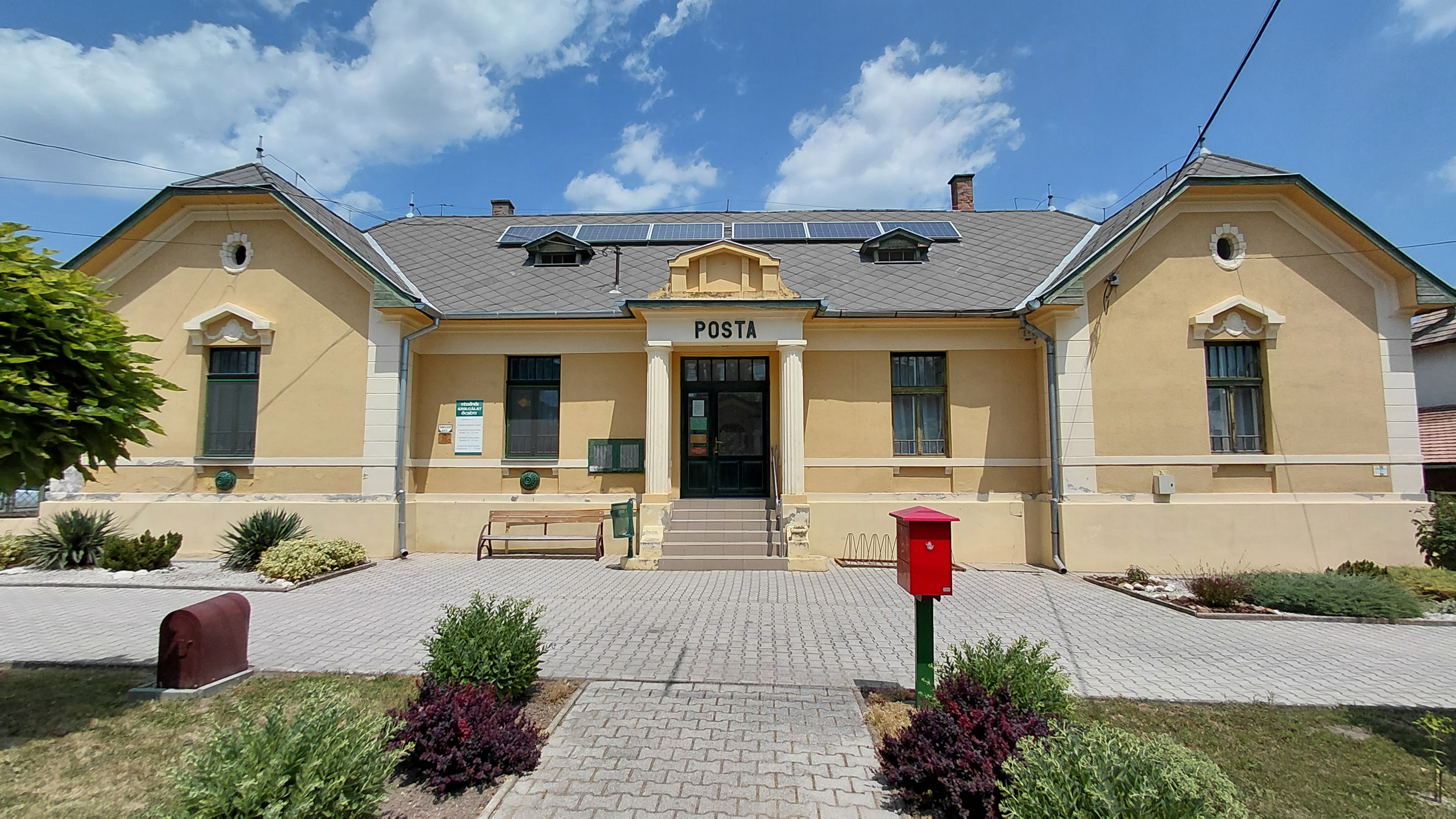
Post office building

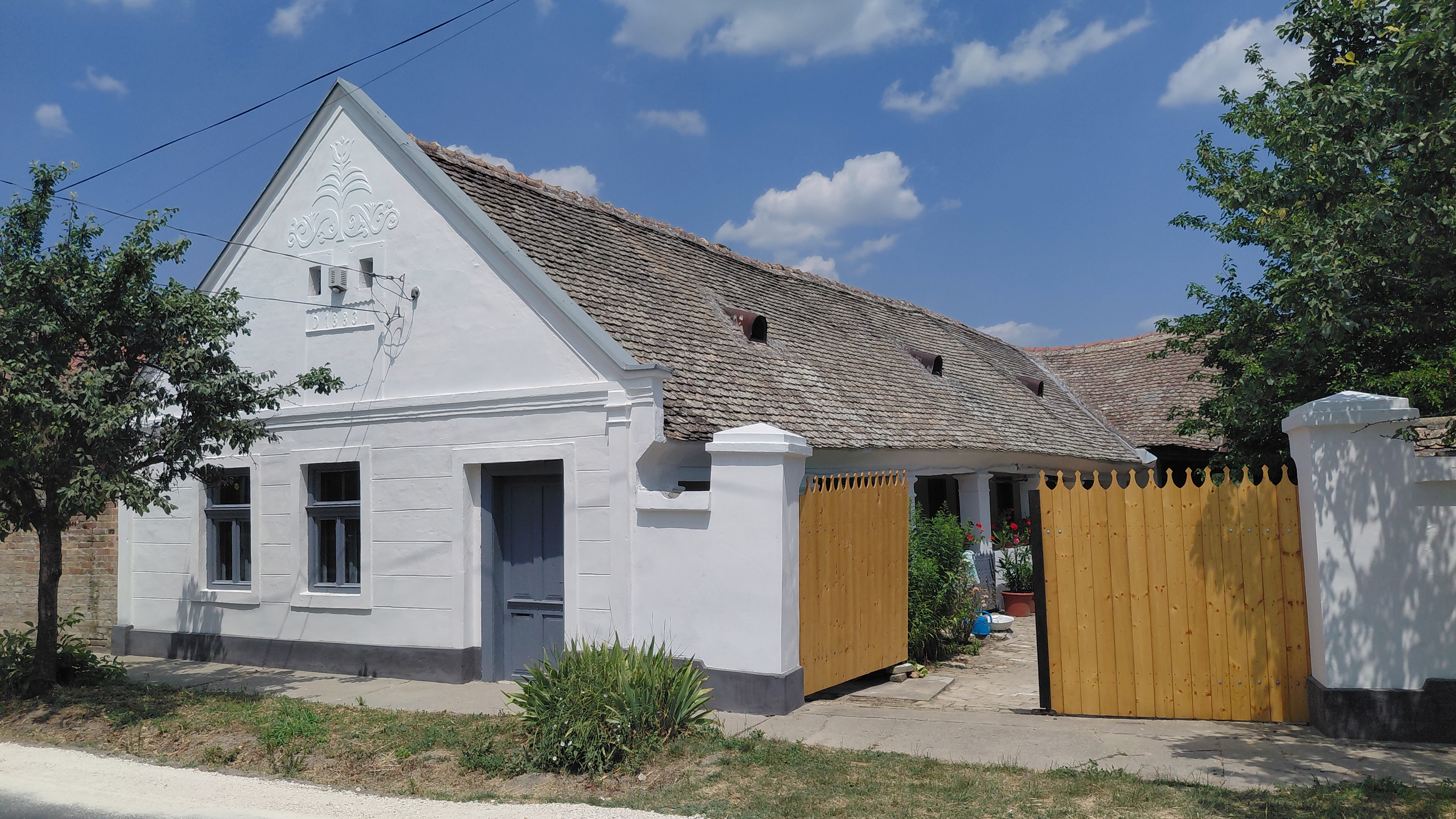
Local folklore museum

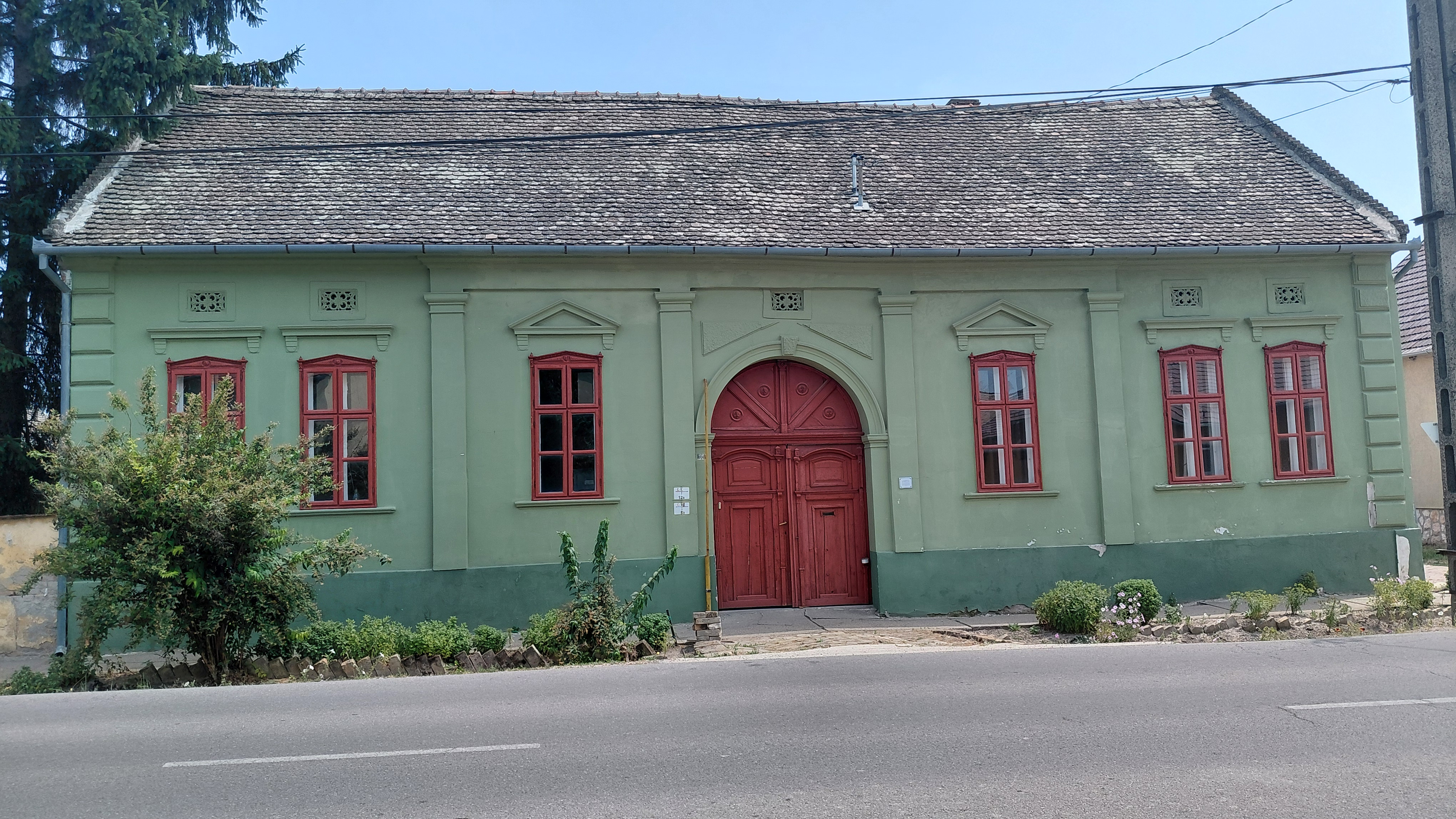
Typical traditional house from Main street

The Őcsény airfield
