= Kisbarátpuszta =

Coordinates: 47°03′N 18°42′E

- District
- Interactive map of Kisbarátpuszta
- Country: Hungary
- Region: Central Transdanubia
- County: Fejér County
- Town: Szabadegyháza

Government
  - Mayor: József Schmitsek
- Elevation: 132 m (433 ft)
- Time zone: UTC+1 (CET)
  - Summer (DST): UTC+2 (CEST)
- Postal code: 2432

Kisbarátpuszta is an uninhabited part of Szabadegyháza in the Subregion of Adony, Fejér County, Hungary.

== Location ==
It lies 5 km South-Southwest from the center of Szabadegyháza.

== Demographics ==
There was 1 house in the village with no inhabitant.
