= Gergely Kálló =

Hungarian politician

Member of the National Assembly of Hungary for Fejér County 4th constituency
- In office 2020–2022

Personal details
- Born: 9 January 1985 (age 41)
- Party: Jobbik

Gergely Kálló (born 9 January 1985) is a Hungarian politician. He is a member of National Assembly of Hungary (Országgyűlés) from 2020 to 2022. He is a member of the Jobbik.
