= Teréz Csillag =

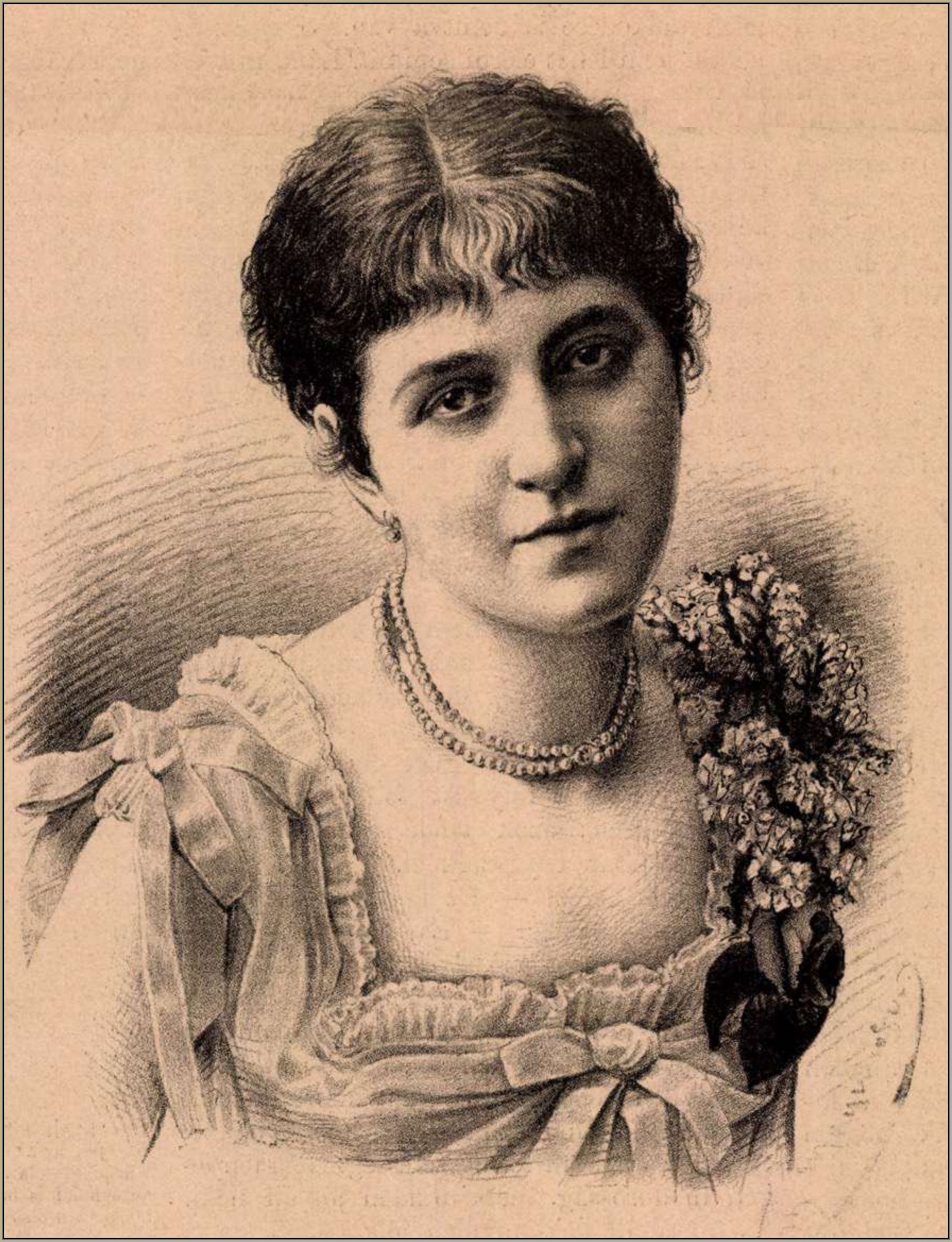
- Csillag in 1901
- Born: Teréz Stern; 17 August 1859; Duna-Adony, Hungary
- Died: 9 July 1925 (aged 65); Budapest, Hungary
- Occupations: Actress; comedian

Therese Csillag (Hungarian: Teréz Csillag, Csillag Teréz, née Stern) (17 August 1859 – 9 July 1925) was a Hungarian Jewish actress.

For many years she was a popular comedian at the National Theater in Budapest. At the age of 13 she attended the dramatic school in that city.

In 1879 she was engaged at the National Theater, where she became known for playing ingénue roles until 1898. Gregor Csiky and other playwrights wrote roles with her in mind. She became a regular at the Vígszínház in Budapest in 1899.

At some point in her life she converted to Christianity.
