= Beloiannisz =

Beloiannisz Μπελογιάννης
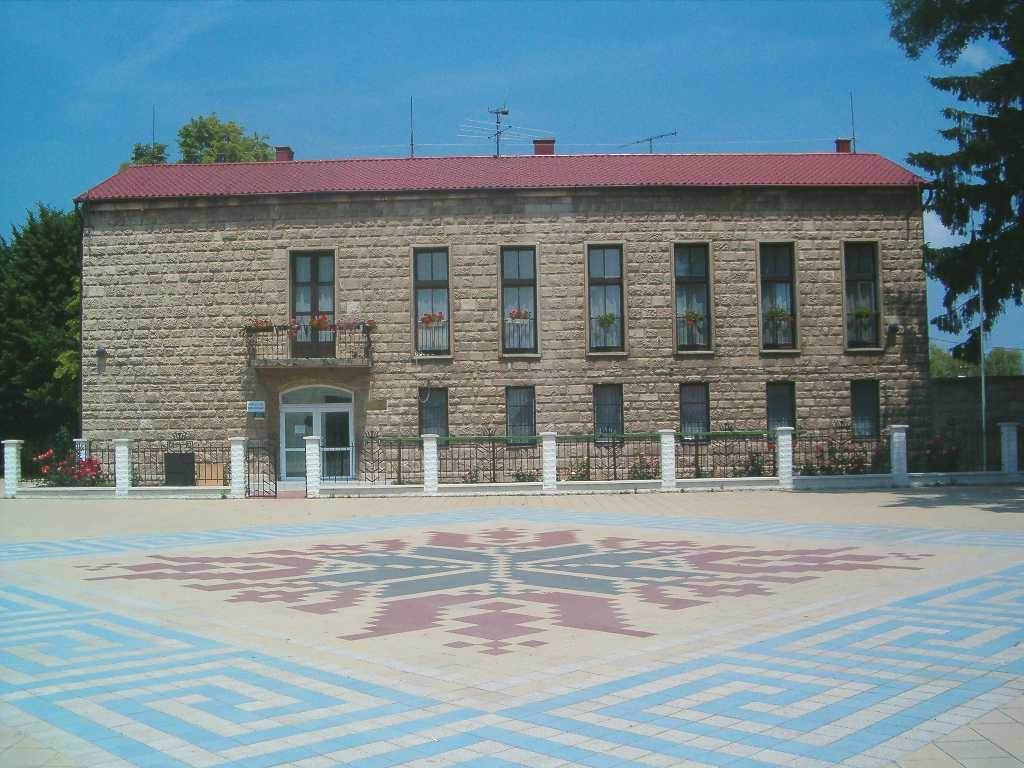
- The library on the main square of the village

- Coat of arms

- Location of Beloiannisz in Hungary
- Coordinates: 47.1835°N 18.8241°E
- Country: Hungary
- Region: Central Transdanubia
- County: Fejér

Area
  - Total: 4.54 km^{2} (1.75 sq mi)

Population (2012)
  - Total: 1,100
  - Density: 240/km^{2} (630/sq mi)
- Time zone: UTC+1 (CET)
  - Summer (DST): UTC+2 (CEST)
- Postal code: 2455
- Area code: +36 25
- Website: http://beloiannisz.hu/

Beloiannisz (Greek: Μπελογιάννης) is a village in Fejér county, Hungary. It was founded by Communist Greek refugees who left Greece after the civil war, and was named after Nikos Beloyannis.

== Location ==
Beloiannisz is close to the railway station of Iváncsa, which is on the Budapest–Pusztaszabolcs railway line. On paved road the village can be reached through a 1 km long access road which links the village to the Iváncsa–Besnyő road. Most of the buses connecting Besnyő and Dunaújváros stop at the village, but the railway plays a more important role.

== History ==
The village is among the newest in the county; its construction was started on May 6, 1950. The village was built by volunteers; within a short time, 418 houses, a school, a kindergarten, a library, a community hall, a doctor's office and a town hall were built. On April 3, 1952 the village (previously called Görögfalva, "Greeks' Village") took the name of Nikos Beloyannis, the Communist leader and resistance fighter, who had been executed 4 days earlier in Greece. The village had 1850 inhabitants then.

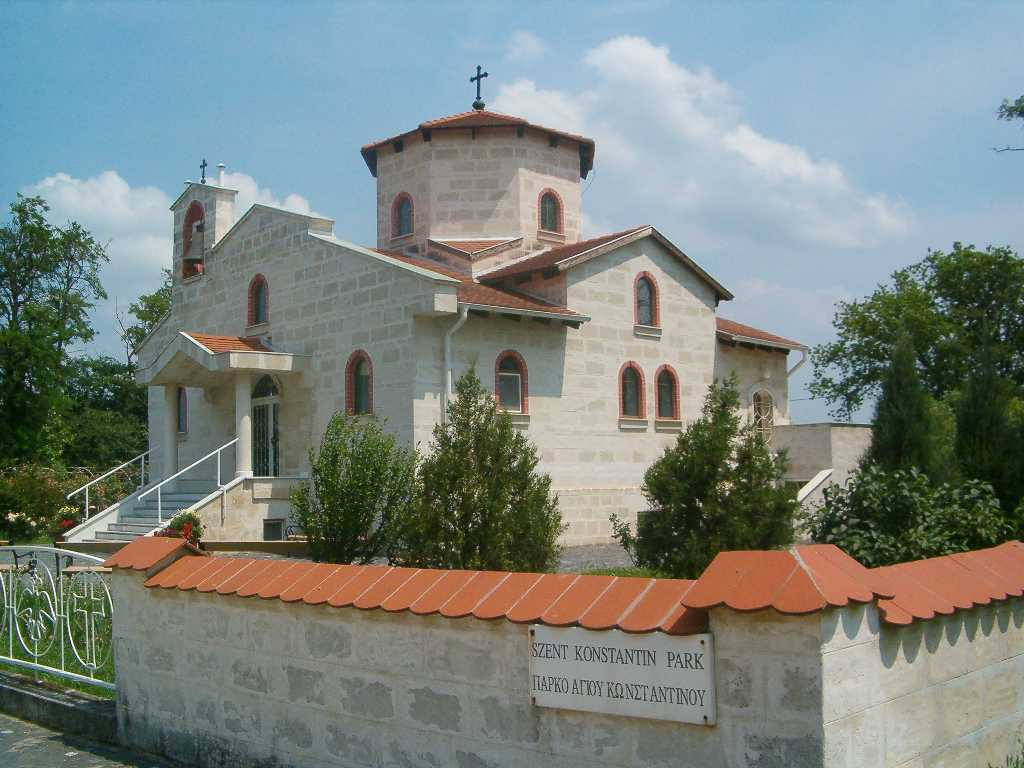
Orthodox church

Starting in 1974, several Greeks left the village and went back to Greece, but many of them (especially the younger people) stayed in Hungary. Now the majority of the population works in the nearby cities of Budapest, Százhalombatta and Dunaújváros. Many people still maintain their Greek identity. According to the 2001 census it had 1,185 inhabitants, 23.4% of them considered themselves Greek, 61.4% Hungarian, 0,3% Romanian, 14,9% didn't answer. Religions: 25.5% Roman Catholic, 14.3% Greek Orthodox, 5.7% Calvinist.

A Greek Orthodox church was built in 1996.

== Tourist sights ==
- Greek Orthodox church (1996)
- Village library; main square
