= Hippolytpuszta =

Coordinates: 47°07′N 18°42′E

Hippolytpuszta is a former village, now a part of Szabadegyháza, Hungary. The postal code is 2432.

== Geography ==
Altitude of Hippolytpuszta is 122 meters.

It currently has a population of around 2 (in 2001).

It lies approximately 6 km north of Szabadegyháza.
