= Ervin Nagy =

Hungarian actor and politician (born 1976)

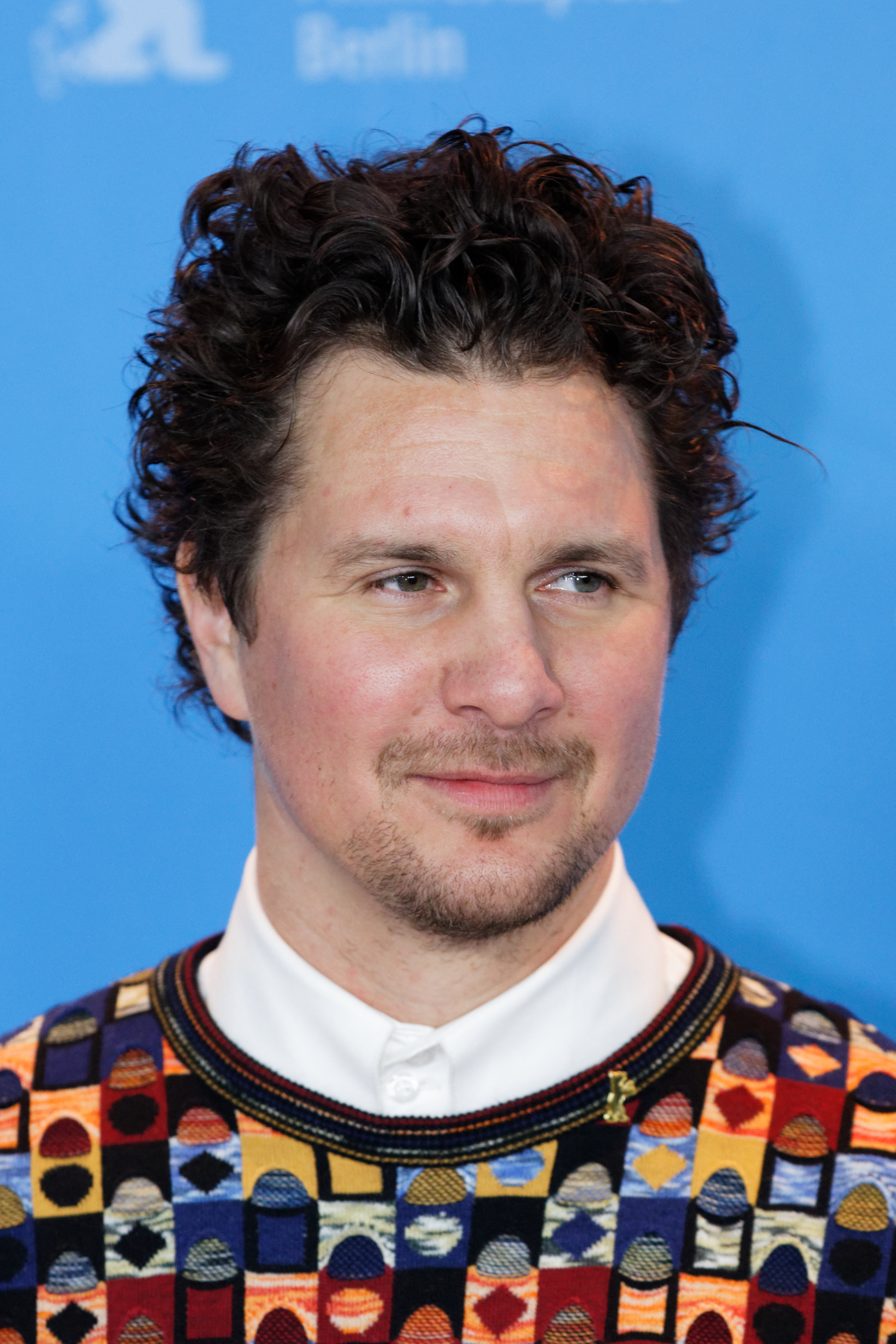
- Nagy in 2017

Member of the National Assembly
- Assuming office 9 May 2026
- Succeeding: Lajos Mészáros
- Constituency: Fejér County 4th

Personal details
- Born: 25 September 1976 (age 49)
- Party: TISZA
- Spouse: Alexandra Borbély (m. 2021)

Ervin Nagy (born 25 September 1976) is a Hungarian actor and politician who was elected member of the National Assembly in 2026.

In 2012, he won the Jászai Mari Award.

He has been married to Alexandra Borbély since 2021.
