= Szabadegyháza =

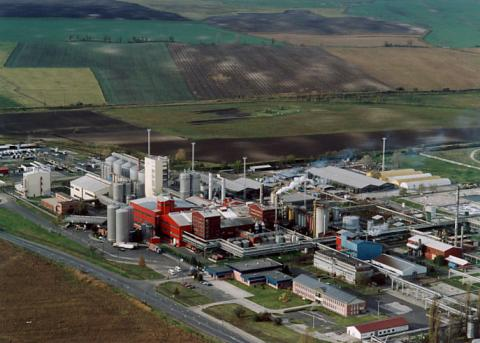

- Coat of arms

- Location of Fejér county in Hungary

- Location of Szabadegyháza
- Coordinates: 47.07845°N 18.69228°E
- Country: Hungary
- County: Fejér

Area
  - Total: 41.64 km^{2} (16.08 sq mi)

Population (2004)
  - Total: 2,237
  - Density: 53.72/km^{2} (139.1/sq mi)
- Time zone: UTC+1 (CET)
  - Summer (DST): UTC+2 (CEST)
- Postal code: 2432
- Area code: 25
- Website: www.szabadegyhaza.hu

Szabadegyháza is a village in Fejér county, Hungary.

== History ==
Szabadegyháza's history dates back to Roman times, with evidence of Roman presence found in archaeological excavations, including tomb covers, ceramic fragments, bronze fibulae, and coins. The region was known to the Romans, intersecting the Intercisa (Dunaújváros) – Gorsium (Tác) route.

Before the Hungarian conquest, the area was already familiar, evidenced by the discovery of a warrior's grave from the Hungarian conquest era in 1965. The village name, initially recorded in a donation letter on 20 November 1659, mentioned owners like Bossányi Gábor, Eölbey Márton, and Szeghy Mihály.

Changing ownership over time, the village played a minor role in the 1848/49 revolution, providing provisions to the Hungarian camp. Population growth began in the 1800s, reaching 1,111 residents in 1910. During World War I, 215 men were called for military service, with eight casualties. In World War II, many young men from the village fought on the front, but no battles occurred within the village.

Becoming an independent municipality in 1926, Szolgaegyháza acquired its current administrative boundaries in 1929. In 1948, it was renamed Szabadegyháza through a decree by the Ministry of Interior (181.321/1948), effective from 1 June 1948.

== Gallery ==
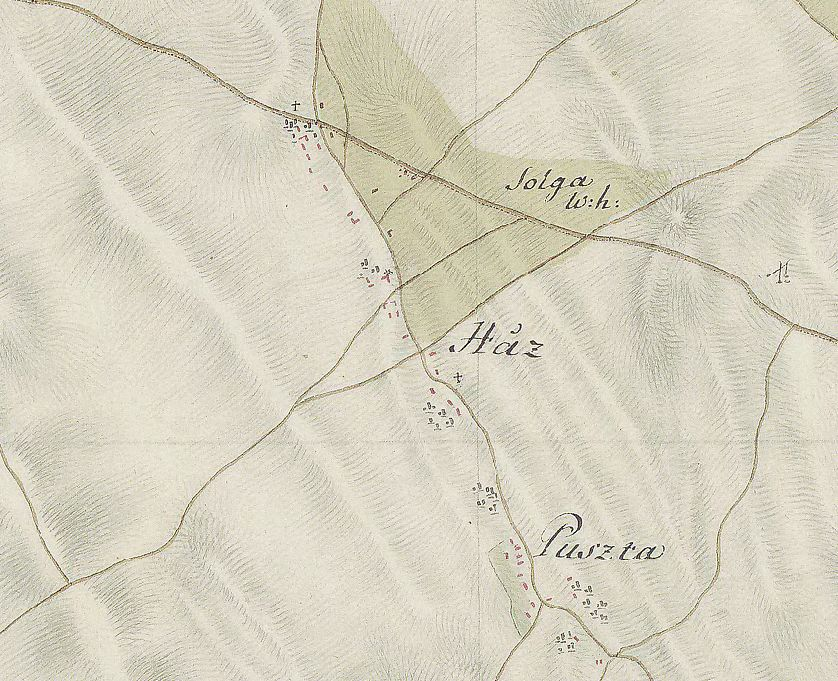
The map of Szabadegyháza from the First Military Mapping Survey of Austria Empire

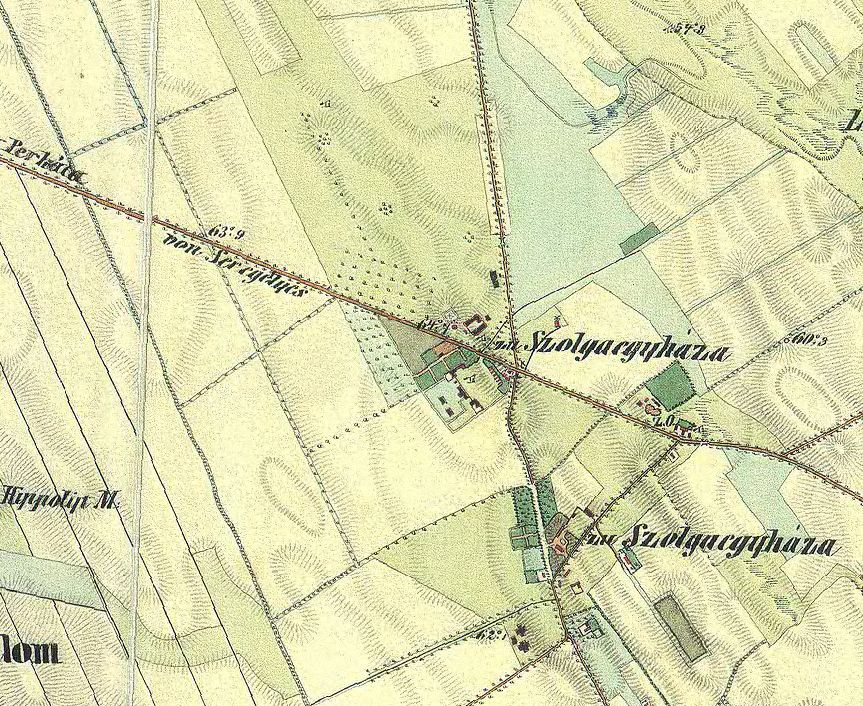
The map of Szabadegyháza from the Second Military Mapping Survey of Austria Empire

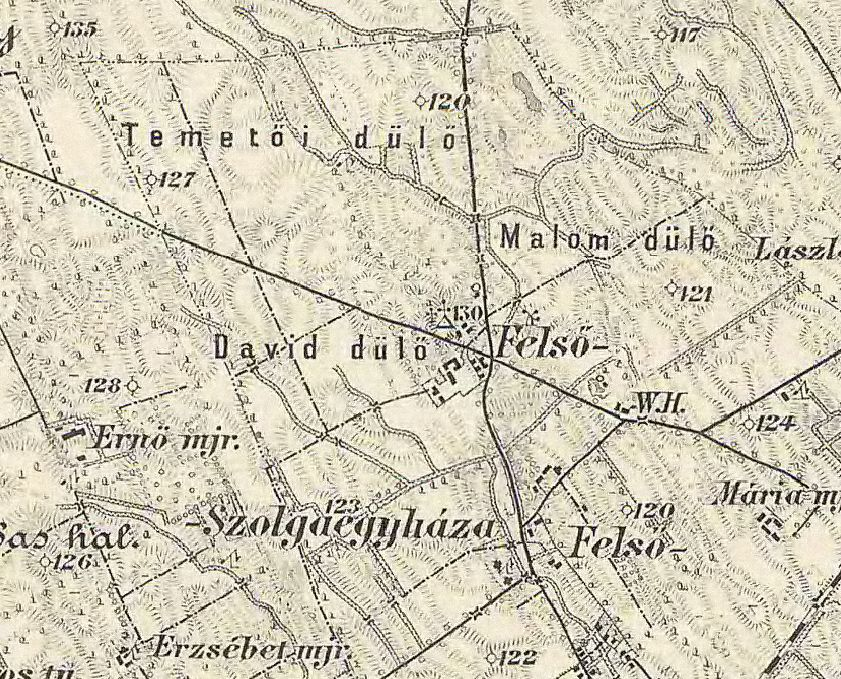
The map of Szabadegyháza from the 3rd Military Mapping Survey of Austria Empire

== Localities ==
- Hippolytpuszta
- Kisbarátpuszta
