= Ráckeresztúr =

Village in Fejér County, Hungary

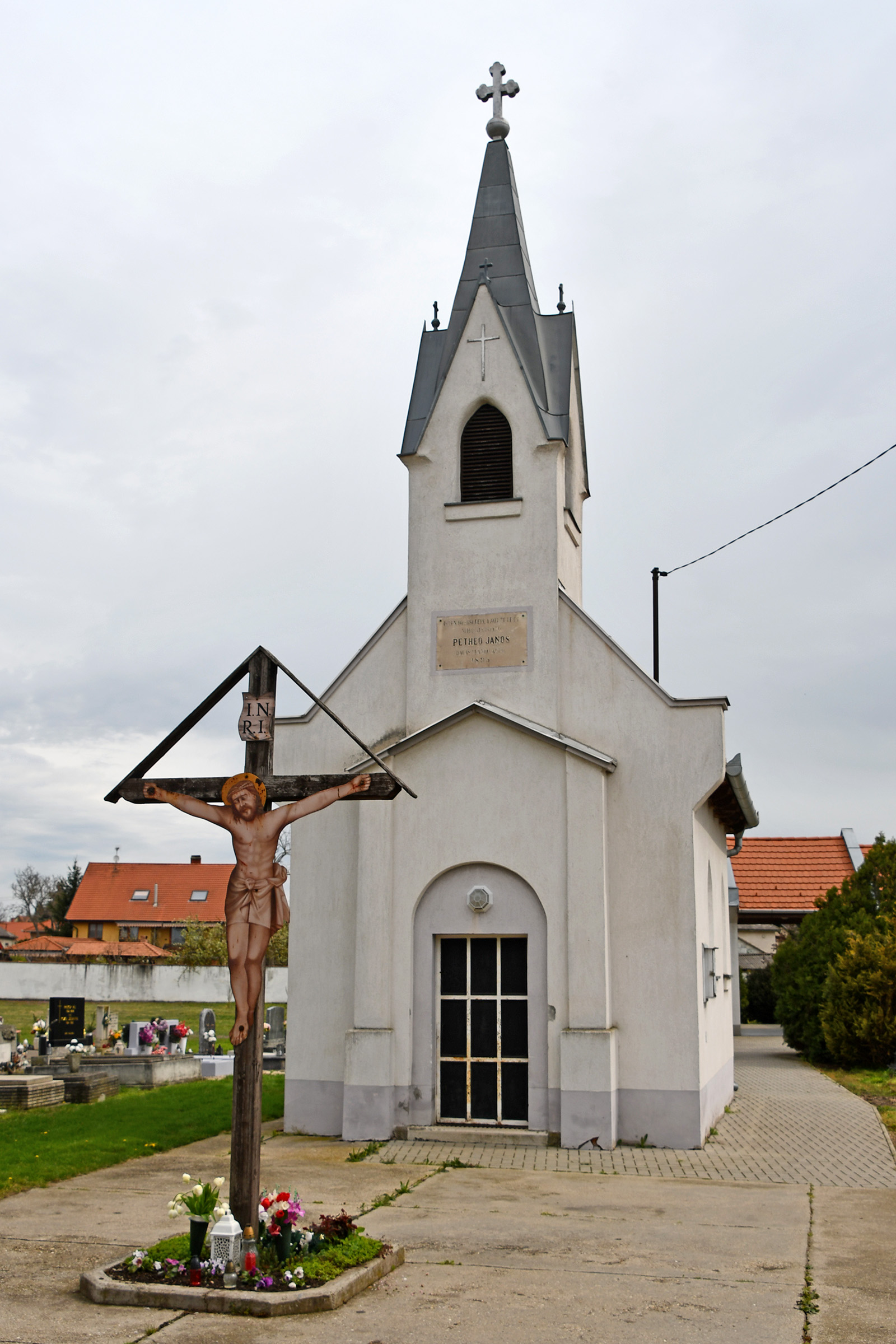

- Location of Ráckeresztúr
- Coordinates: 47.27376°N 18.83476°E
- Country: Hungary
- County: Fejér

Area
  - Total: 35.3 km^{2} (13.6 sq mi)

Population (2004)
  - Total: 3,226
  - Density: 91.38/km^{2} (236.7/sq mi)
- Time zone: UTC+1 (CET)
  - Summer (DST): UTC+2 (CEST)
- Postal code: 2465
- Area code: 25
- Website: www.rackeresztur.hu

Ráckeresztúr is a village in Fejér County, Hungary. It is situated in the Martonvásár District of Fejér County, about 30 km south-west of Budapest on the broad alluvial plain between the Vértes Hills and the Danube. The settlement occupies 35.3 km^{2} and had 3,581 inhabitants at the 2022 census, giving a population density just above 100 per square kilometre. It lies on the left bank of the Szent László-patak, a minor stream draining the mezzanine between Lake Velence and the Danube, and functions today as a commuter village with direct road links to the M7 motorway and suburban rail connections through nearby Martonvásár.

The first extant written reference to the locality—then simply "Keresztúr"—occurs in a 1347 boundary charter issued during the reign of Louis I, while archaeological surface finds point to earlier Avar, Celtic and Roman activity. The prefix rác-, denoting Southern-Slav (Serb) settlers, became attached after Orthodox farmers repopulated the area circa 1629 following the long Turkish wars. Baron Anselm Fleissemann purchased the estate in 1717 and soon financed a single-nave Baroque church dedicated to the Exaltation of the Holy Cross; construction stretched from the 1720s to its vaulting in 1769, and the tower was repeatedly rebuilt after fire and storm damage. Eighteenth-century tax rolls already list over ninety peasant houses and a handful of craftsmen; by 1830 the population had passed 1,300, rising steadily with new house-plots laid out on former pasture.

Viticulture has long underpinned the local economy: the village forms the south-eastern spur of the Etyek–Buda wine district, whose chalky loess over limestone favours high-acid white varieties such as Chardonnay, Irsai Olivér and Sauvignon Blanc. Mixed farming—principally maize, sunflower and livestock—remains typical across the loess plains of the Mezőföld, where cereals and oilseeds still covered about 70 percent of the arable land in 2013 and Fejér County hosted some of Hungary's largest cattle operations. A growing share of residents now commute to service-sector jobs in Budapest: the 2011 census showed that more than 15 percent of Ráckeresztúr's labour force travelled to the capital, placing the village firmly inside the Budapest agglomeration.

The municipal heritage register lists a free-standing late-Baroque Trinity column (1779) on the Szentlászló heath, First- and Second-World-War memorials in the Hősök park, and two nineteenth-century manor houses: the classically fronted Ivánkay residence, built for the Szüts–Ivánkay family in the 1820s, and the nearby Pázmándy–Petheő mansion, later remodelled by the Brauch family and set in an eight-hectare landscaped park.
