= Mezőfalva =

- Large village
- Flag Coat of arms

- Location of Fejér county in Hungary

- Location of Mezőfalva
- Coordinates: 46.93780°N 18.78666°E
- Country: Hungary
- County: Fejér
- District: Dunaújváros

Area
  - Total: 80.42 km^{2} (31.05 sq mi)

Population (2004)
  - Total: 4,929
  - Density: 61.29/km^{2} (158.7/sq mi)
- Time zone: UTC+1 (CET)
  - Summer (DST): UTC+2 (CEST)
- Postal code: 2422
- Area code: (+36) 25

Mezőfalva is a large village in Fejér county, Hungary.
