= Szedres =

- Location of Tolna county in Hungary

- Location of Szedres
- Coordinates: 46.47889°N 18.68493°E
- Country: Hungary
- County: Tolna

Area
  - Total: 46.3 km^{2} (17.9 sq mi)

Population (2004)
  - Total: 2,491
  - Density: 53.8/km^{2} (139/sq mi)
- Time zone: UTC+1 (CET)
  - Summer (DST): UTC+2 (CEST)
- Postal code: 7056
- Area code: 74

Szedres is a village in Tolna County, Hungary.

It was founded by István Bezerédj (1796 - 1856) for cotton production.
