= Előszállás =

- Large village
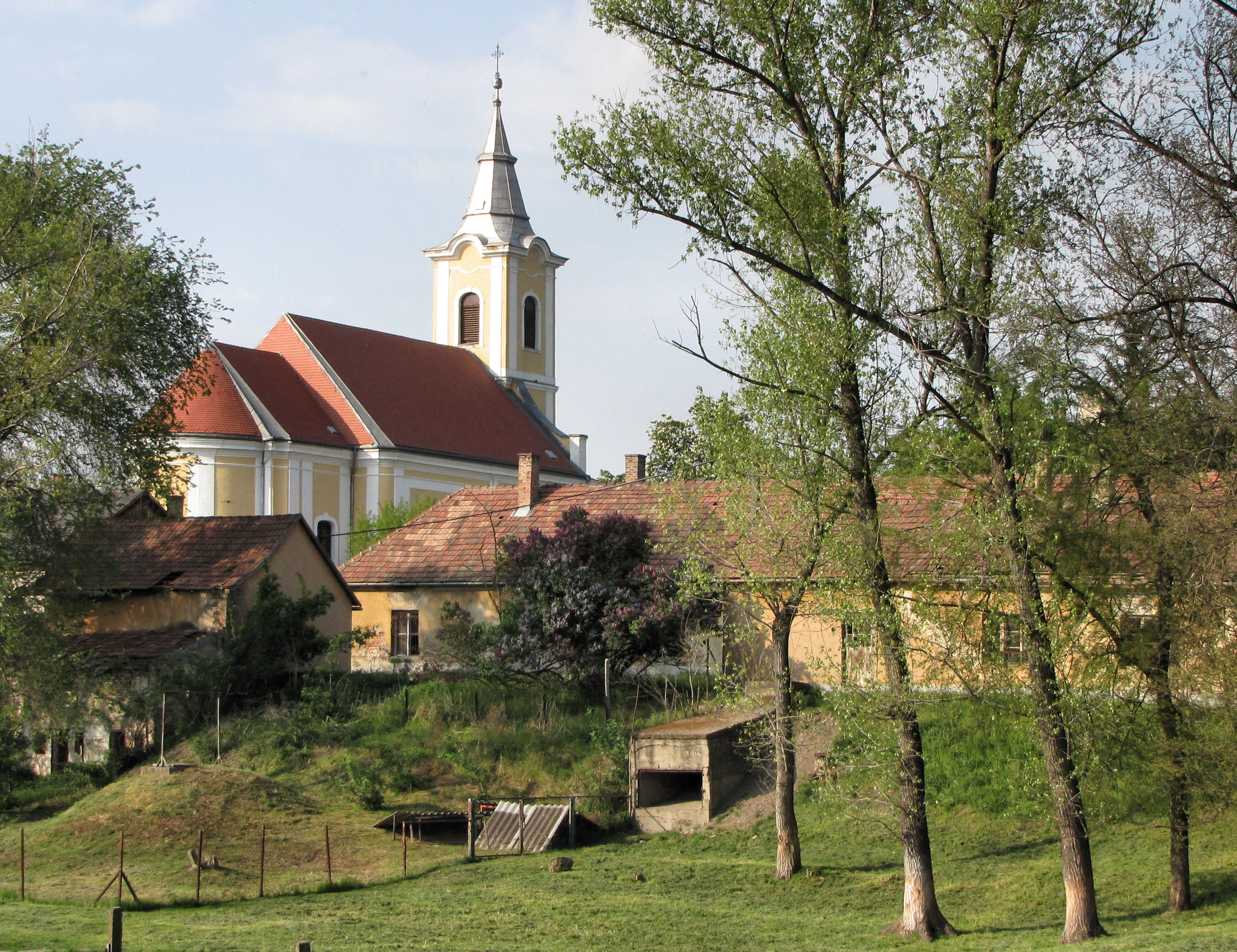
- Roman Catholic church

- Flag Coat of arms

- Location of Előszállás
- Coordinates: 46.82505°N 18.82656°E
- Country: Hungary
- Region: Central Transdanubia
- County: Fejér
- District: Dunaújváros

Area
  - Total: 39.83 km^{2} (15.38 sq mi)

Population (1 January 2025)
  - Total: 2,363
  - Density: 59.33/km^{2} (153.7/sq mi)
- Time zone: UTC+1 (CET)
  - Summer (DST): UTC+2 (CEST)
- Postal code: 2424
- Area code: (+36) 25
- Website: www.eloszallas.hu

Előszállás (German: Neuhof) is a village in Fejér County, Hungary.

== Name ==
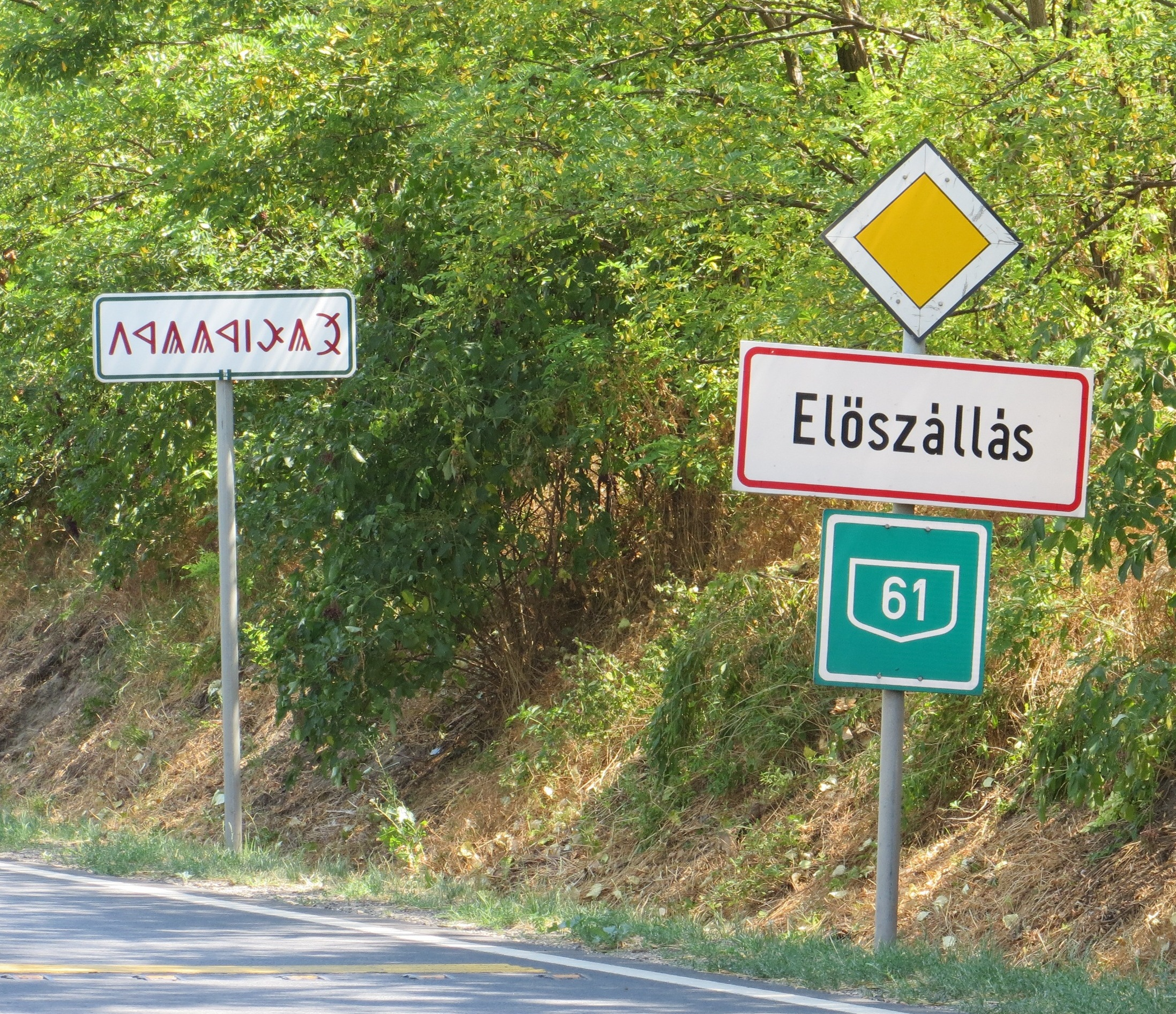
Road sign in Old Hungarian script

Előszállás was first mentioned in written sources in a 1537 record as Elevzallas (and as Ellő Szállás in 1740, Elő-Szállás in 1785, and Ellö-szálas in 1805). The name is probably of Cuman origin; the westernmost settlement of the Cumans was located here. The village was known as Neuhof in German.

== History ==
Előszállás and the surrounding areas were occupied before the Romans. Celtic, Avar, and Roman artifacts have been found here. At the beginning of the 16th century, the provost of Fehérvár had an estate here. Later it became the property of the Sulyok family (Balázs, István, and György Sulyok). After this it was a property of Várpalota Castle.
