= Sárköz =

Sárköz (Hungarian: "mud alley" or "mud passage") may refer to:

- Sárköz, a historical area in Tolna (county), Hungary
- Livada, Satu Mare, a town in Satu Mare County, Romania

== See also ==
- Sárközi
