= Perkáta =

- Large village
- Flag Coat of arms

- Location of Fejér county in Hungary

- Location of Perkáta
- Coordinates: 47.04795°N 18.78345°E
- Country: Hungary
- County: Fejér
- District: Dunaújváros

Area
  - Total: 74.52 km^{2} (28.77 sq mi)

Population (2004)
  - Total: 4,139
  - Density: 55.54/km^{2} (143.8/sq mi)
- Time zone: UTC+1 (CET)
  - Summer (DST): UTC+2 (CEST)
- Postal code: 2431
- Area code: (+36) 25

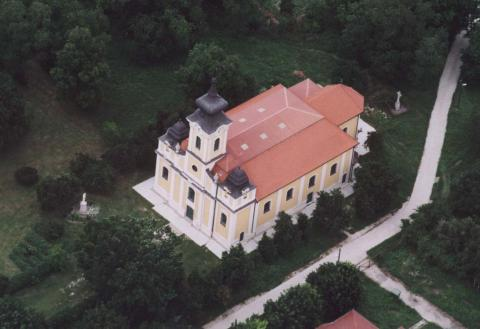
Perkáta, temple from above

Perkáta is a village in Fejér County, Hungary. Straddling the old Buda–Pécs postal road on the Mezőföld loess plain, Perkáta lies 12 kilometres (7.5 mi) west of the Danube at Dunaújváros and 28 kilometres (17 mi) south-east of Székesfehérvár. The cadastral area covers 52.3 km^{2} (20.2 sq mi), most of it large-block arable rotated between wheat, sunflower and maize; poplar shelter-belts planted after the 1956 “great wind-storm” still parcel out the fields. Modern census returns count 3,844 permanent residents in 2022, a slow rebound after the post-socialist low of 3,611 in 2011.

== History ==
First mentioned in a 1162 charter as Percata, the settlement passed through royal, episcopal and noble hands before the Ottoman wars left it deserted. Resettlement began in 1696 when Ferenc Nádasdy invited Catholic Hungarian and Slovak peasants to cultivate the "praedium Perkatha". By 1840 the village had grown to 2,100 people and sported a single-nave Church of St Stephen (consecrated 1763, Classicist façade rebuilt 1852). Its baroque high altar and pulpit were carved by the Johann Mayer workshop of Győr and rank among the county's best late-Rococo woodworks. During the Hungarian Revolution of 1848, local notary József Jantyik organised a volunteer troop that fought at Pákozd; his memorial obelisk stands beside the church wall.

== Győry Castle ==
Perkáta's architectural show-piece is Győry Castle (Győry-kastély), a three-winged, U-shaped manor built in 1802 for Ferenc Győry, assessors to Fejér County. The ashlar-faced corps de logis fronts an English landscape park once famed for black walnut avenues. Nationalised in 1945 and long neglected, the mansion was restored between 2009 and 2013 with EU Regional Fund support; it now houses a wedding hall, village museum and the Sino–Hungarian friendship exhibition that recalls Perkáta's twinning with Tianjin's Wuqing District since 2002.

== Economy and culture ==
Agriculture dominates employment, but proximity to Dunaújváros's steelworks and the M6 motorway feeds a commuter stream; 41 % of the workforce travelled out daily in the 2022 survey. Local identity centres on two annual events: the St Stephen’s Day Harvest Fair (20 August), where threshing demonstrations revive nineteenth-century techniques, and the Chestnut Festival each October, when folk dancers from twin towns in France and China perform in the castle courtyard. Cycling tourism is rising thanks to the sign-posted "Great Plain to Danube" route, which uses leafy canal banks to link Perkáta with the Danube flood-forest at Rácalmás and the Roman limes remains of Dunaújváros.
