= Daruszentmiklós =

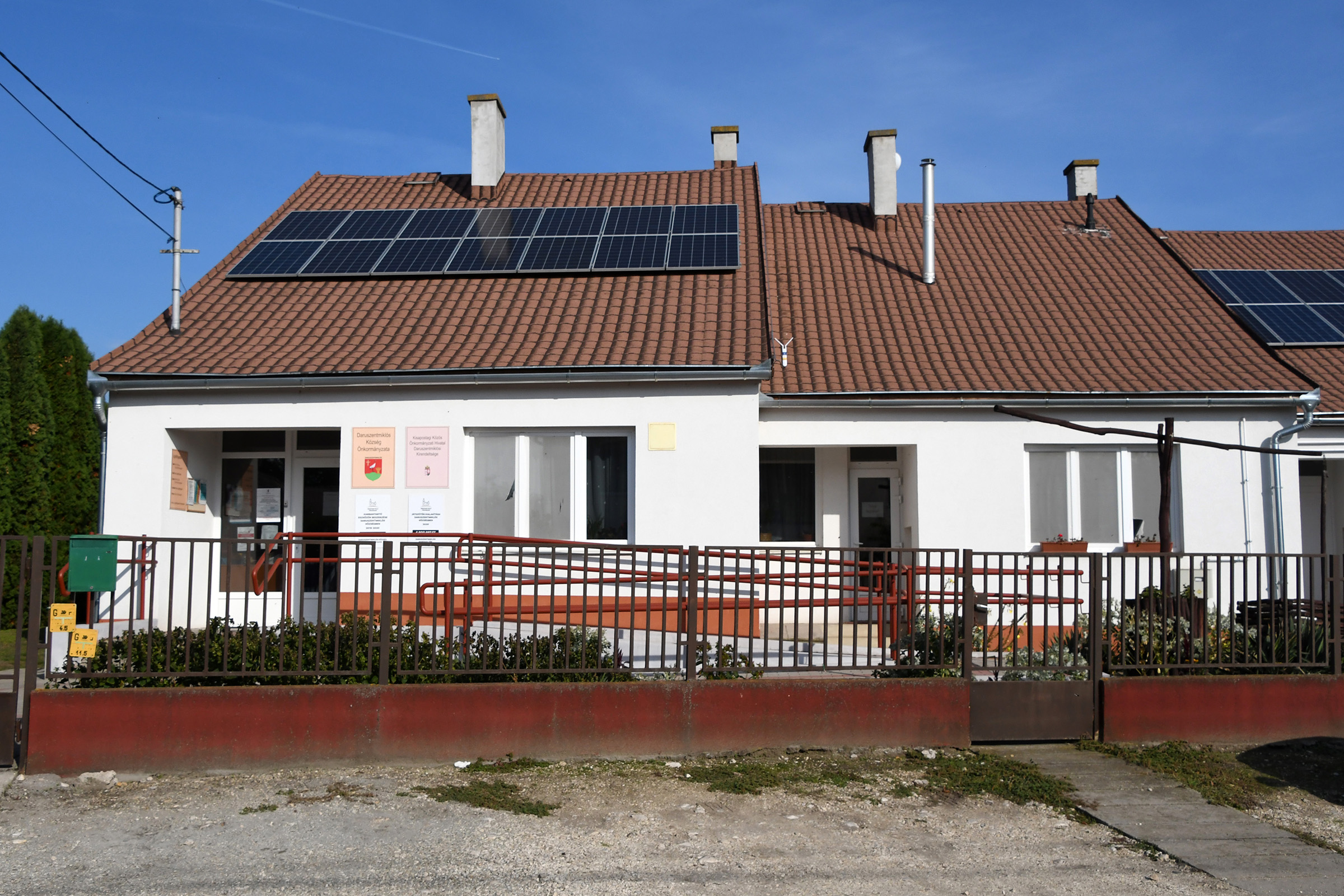
- Village hall

- Coat of arms

- Location of Fejér county in Hungary

- Location of Daruszentmiklós
- Coordinates: 46.872837°N 18.856866°E
- Country: Hungary
- County: Fejér

Area
  - Total: 19.28 km^{2} (7.44 sq mi)

Population (2004)
  - Total: 1,469
  - Density: 76.19/km^{2} (197.3/sq mi)
- Time zone: UTC+1 (CET)
  - Summer (DST): UTC+2 (CEST)
- Postal code: 2423
- Area code: 25
- Website: www.daruszentmiklos.hu

Daruszentmiklós is a village in Fejér county, Hungary.
