= Kisapostag =

- Coat of arms

- Location of Kisapostag in Hungary
- Coordinates: 46.8938°N 18.9317°E
- Country: Hungary
- Region: Central Transdanubia
- County: Fejér

Area
  - Total: 9.58 km^{2} (3.70 sq mi)

Population (2012)
  - Total: 1,414
  - Density: 148/km^{2} (382/sq mi)
- Time zone: UTC+1 (CET)
  - Summer (DST): UTC+2 (CEST)
- Postal code: 2428
- Area code: +36 25
- Website: https://kisapostag.hu/

Kisapostag is a village in Fejér county, Hungary. As of 2012, it had a population of 1,414, living in 508 houses. About 8 kilometers (5.0 mi) away is the nearby city of Dunaújváros. Kisapostag is near the M-6 highway and the Danube River, which is good for the water-tourism in Kisapostag (it has a high-quality dock and accommodations).

== History ==
The area was already populated in the Bronze Age, and the Kisapostag culture is named after it. Later there were two Roman watch-towers, which were excavated in modern times during road construction. A Roman milestone was also found. About the 11th to 13th centuries was nun estate: "Veszprém-völgyi apácák" this land. Later devolve to upon estate, family Paksy. In centuries this area significant ferry of Danube. This proved a map when become 1775. During Turkish period lose its population the land. After from opposite bank the people cultivate this area. At the end of 19th century become independent this village eight family with formation, namely Kisapostag.
