= Pusztaszabolcs =

Town in Fejér County, Hungary

- Town
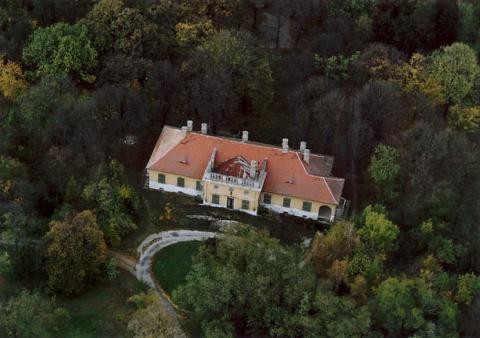
- Aerial view

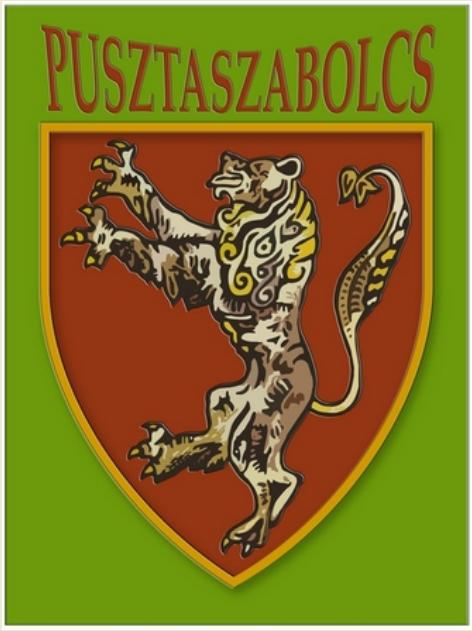
- Coat of arms

- Location of Fejér county in Hungary

- Location of Pusztaszabolcs
- Coordinates: 47.14127°N 18.75940°E
- Country: Hungary
- County: Fejér
- District: Dunaújváros

Area
  - Total: 51.67 km^{2} (19.95 sq mi)

Population (2015)
  - Total: 5,904
  - Density: 114.3/km^{2} (295.9/sq mi)
- Time zone: UTC+1 (CET)
  - Summer (DST): UTC+2 (CEST)
- Postal code: 2490
- Area code: (+36) 25
- Website: www.pusztaszabolcs.hu

Pusztaszabolcs is a town in Fejér County, Hungary. Flanked by the loess fields of the Mezőföld and the Danube back-swamps, Pusztaszabolcs occupies 51.7 km^{2} (20.0 sq mi) at the junction of three main railway corridors—Budapest–Pécs, Székesfehérvár–Paks and the freight cut-off to Dunaújváros.

== History ==
Although first attested as Zabolch in a 1270 charter, the modern settlement coalesced only after 1861, when the Southern State Railway opened a station on the freshly laid Budapest–Zimony line; within a decade trackside plots were selling for twice the price of the surrounding cropland. Rail employment, grain warehousing and a sugar-beet press boosted head-count from 642 in 1870 to 5,904 by 2015, and the 2022 census records a further rise to 6,134 residents, two-thirds of whom commute daily to Dunaújváros steelworks or Székesfehérvár electronics plants.

== Landmarks ==
The town centre is anchored by two contrasting churches: the single-nave Roman Catholic Church of the Visitation (1834, Copf-style façade and Empire altar), enlarged after the 1863 cholera epidemic, and the Reformed church (1928), whose square brick tower mirrors inter-war Calvinist architecture across Fejér. Between them stands a First-World-War stele by sculptor Lajos Berán, while the small open-air railway museum beside the station preserves a 1942-built MÁV 375 steam locomotive—a type once synonymous with branch-line traffic in Transdanubia. An autumn railway open-house forms part of the town's annual event calendar.

== Transport ==
Since 2018 the municipality has capitalised on its transport node: an EU-funded project electrified and doubled 55 km of track between Pusztaszabolcs and Százhalombatta, replaced the century-old lattice footbridge with lifts and glazed walkways, and built a 300-space park-and-ride intended to shift commuter traffic off Highway 6. Parallel investments laid a 23-km cycleway that ties the town into the Lake Velence loop and the Danube EuroVelo 6 spur.

== Twin towns – sister cities ==
Pusztaszabolcs is twinned with:

- Staufenberg, Germany
- Dorobanți, Romania

== Gallery ==
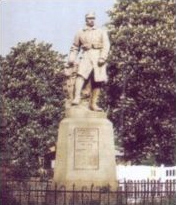
First World War monument

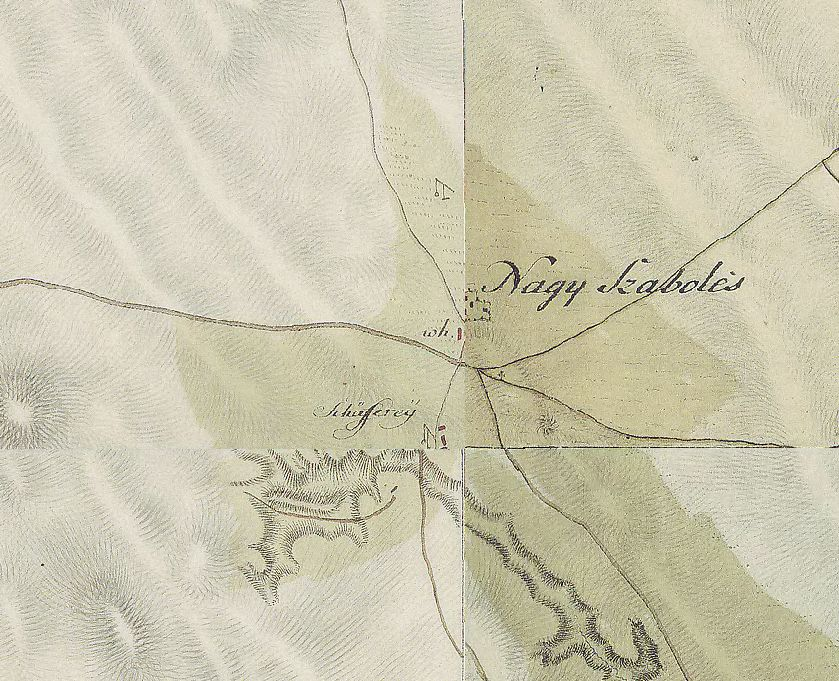
Map of Pusztaszabolcs from the First Military Mapping Survey of the Austrian Empire.

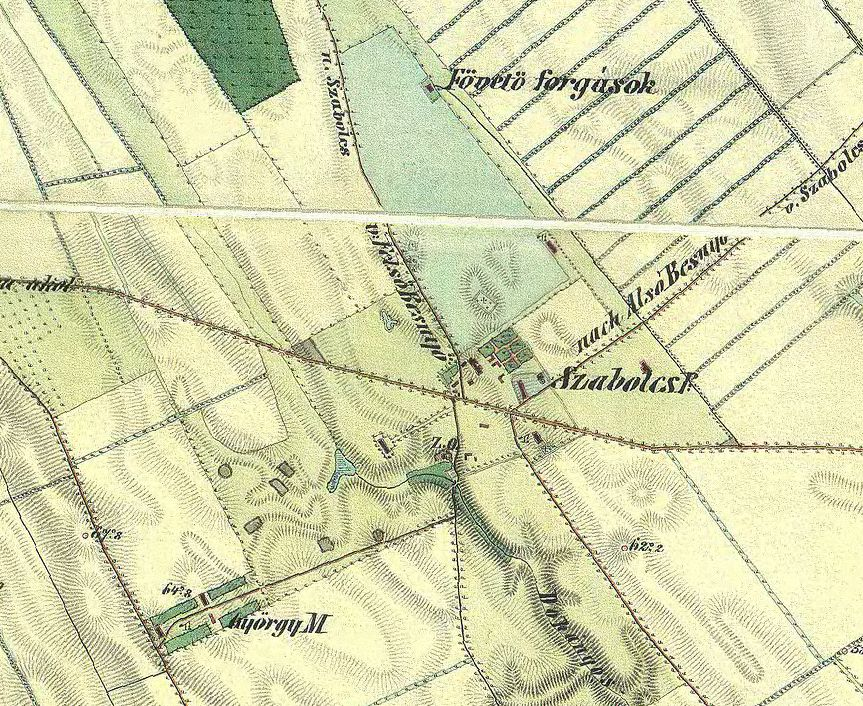
Map of Pusztaszabolcs from the Second Military Mapping Survey of the Austrian Empire.

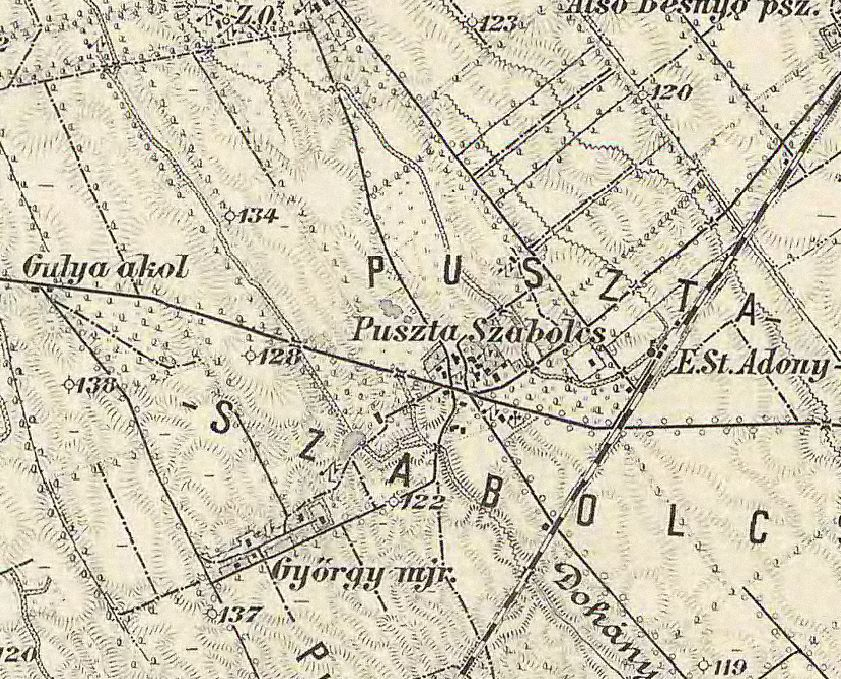
Map of Pusztaszabolcs from the Third Military Mapping Survey of the Austrian Empire.
