= Baracs =

Place in Central Transdanubia, Hungary

Baracs Annamatia (in Latin)
- Flag Coat of arms

- Location of Baracs in Hungary
- Coordinates: 46.9105°N 18.8664°E
- Country: Hungary
- Region: Central Transdanubia
- County: Fejér

Area
  - Total: 55.18 km^{2} (21.31 sq mi)

Population (2012)
  - Total: 3,484
  - Density: 63.14/km^{2} (163.5/sq mi)
- Time zone: UTC+1 (CET)
  - Summer (DST): UTC+2 (CEST)
- Postal code: 2426
- Area code: +36 25
- Website: http://baracs.hu/

Baracs is a village in Fejér county, Hungary.
