= Adony =

Town in Fejér, Hungary

- Town
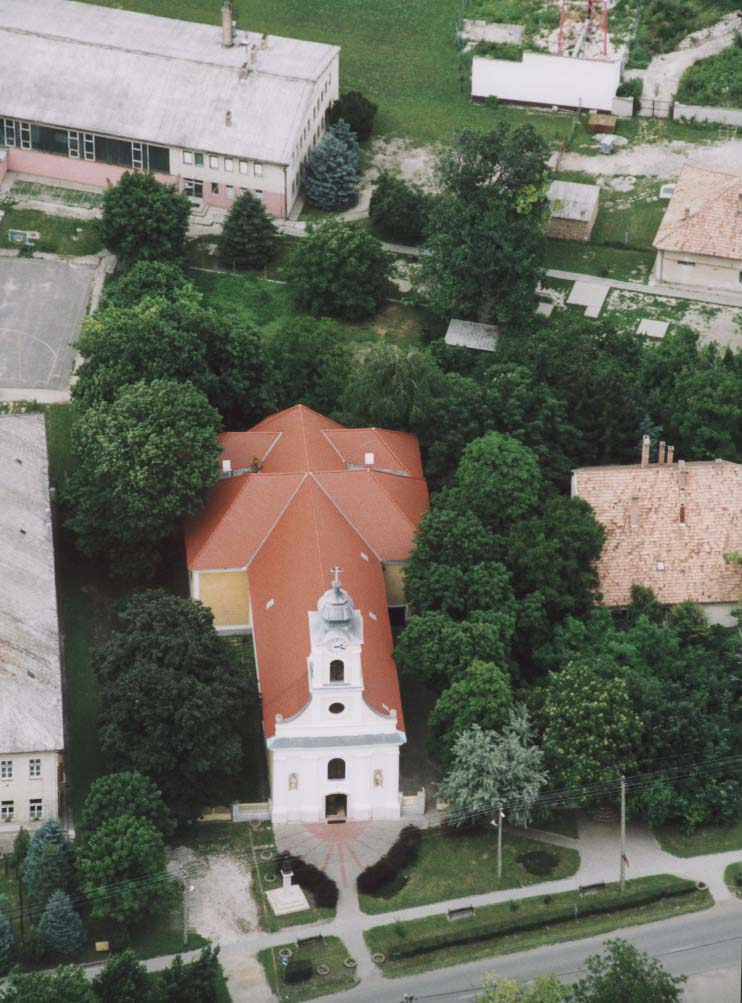
- Adony, church

- Flag Coat of arms

- Location of Adony
- Coordinates: 47.11895°N 18.86538°E
- Country: Hungary
- County: Fejér
- District: Dunaújváros

Area
  - Total: 61.05 km^{2} (23.57 sq mi)

Population (2015)
  - Total: 3,679
  - Density: 60.26/km^{2} (156.1/sq mi)
- Time zone: UTC+1 (CET)
  - Summer (DST): UTC+2 (CEST)
- Postal code: 2457
- Area code: (+36) 25
- Website: adony.hu

Adony (formerly Duna-Adony; German: Adam; Latin: Vetus Salina or Vetusallum) is a town in Fejér County, Hungary.

== Etymology ==
The town's name comes from the old Hungarian personal name Odun and was attested as such in 1332. Odun possibly formed from the ad verb, meaning 'give'.

== Twin towns – sister cities ==
Adony is twinned with:

- Oberweser, Germany (1995)
- Szczekociny, Poland (2001)
- Cehu Silvaniei, Romania (2009)

== People ==
- Teréz Csillag, actress
