= Kulcs =

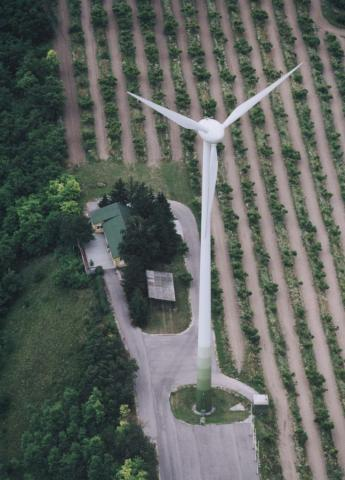

- Location of Fejér county in Hungary

- Location within Hungary
- Coordinates: 47.071759°N 18.918457°E
- Country: Hungary
- County: Fejér

Area
  - Total: 16.73 km^{2} (6.46 sq mi)

Population (2004)
  - Total: 2,009
  - Density: 120.08/km^{2} (311.0/sq mi)
- Time zone: UTC+1 (CET)
  - Summer (DST): UTC+2 (CEST)
- Postal code: 2458
- Area code: 25
- Website: www.kulcs.eu

Kulcs is a village in Fejér county, Hungary.

Located along the shore of the Danube River, Kulcs is in Fejer County, in central Hungary. Steamboats were a common daily sight for locals until the 1960s. Nowadays, commercial boats and tourist ferries from Budapest, Vienna and surrounding regions still travel past the village.

In the last 20 years, many larger parcels of grazing and farmland had begun to be sub-divided. Kulcs was mainly settled as "summer residences" by apartment dwelling, middle-class families. Many small, family-owned vineyards and orchards are still enjoyed by multiple generational families near Rácalmás and Dunaújváros town. The term "kulcs" pronounced "cool-ch" translates to "key". A popular "nyaralótelep" or leisure village.

The village has been expanding, adding a heritage center, new elementary school, volunteer fire brigade and numerous cultural clubs, an expanding library and activities for the residents. The re-development of road infrastructure, telephone, cable TV, internet, are becoming increasingly attractive for permanent residency. On-staff doctor's office, pediatrician, pharmacy, dentistry, are all under one roof: the Regional Medical Center, built in 2004, offers post-surgery rehabilitation, one-day surgery, and outpatient care in primary healthcare. A private home for the elderly can also be found in Kulcs. The 140-student elementary school took up the name of eminent writer István Fekete.

== Demographics ==
- Population in 1996: 1213 main permanent residents.
- Population in 2006: 2300 main permanent residents.
- The number of homes, including summer homes: 2180.
- Population during the summer months reaches 4500–4800.
