= Besnyő =

- Coat of arms

- Location of Besnyő in Hungary
- Coordinates: 47.1892°N 18.7898°E
- Country: Hungary
- Region: Central Transdanubia
- County: Fejér
- District: Dunaújváros

Area
  - Total: 44.64 km^{2} (17.24 sq mi)

Population (2012)
  - Total: 1,779
  - Density: 39.85/km^{2} (103.2/sq mi)
- Time zone: UTC+1 (CET)
  - Summer (DST): UTC+2 (CEST)
- Postal code: 2456
- Area code: +36 25
- Website: https://besnyo.hu/

Besnyő is a village in Dunaújváros District of Fejér County in Hungary.
