= Rácalmás =

- Town
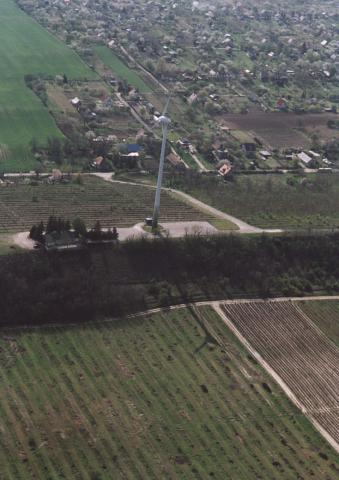
- Aerial view

- Flag Coat of arms

- Location of Fejér county in Hungary

- Location of Rácalmás
- Coordinates: 47.02526°N 18.94037°E
- Country: Hungary
- County: Fejér
- District: Dunaújváros

Government
  - Mayor: István Schrick

Area
  - Total: 40.65 km^{2} (15.70 sq mi)

Population (2010)
  - Total: 4,470
  - Density: 106.93/km^{2} (276.9/sq mi)
- Demonym: rácalmási
- Time zone: UTC+1 (CET)
  - Summer (DST): UTC+2 (CEST)
- Postal code: 2459
- Area code: (+36) 25
- Website: racalmas.hu

Rácalmás (Hungarian pronunciation: [ˈraːt͡sɒlmaːʃ]) is a town in Central Transdanubia, in Fejér county, Hungary. Located on the right side of river Danube around 61 km south of Budapest.

The name Almás first appeared in documents in 1329, named after the noble Almási family who owned estates there. Later, due to the large Serbian population (Rascians) who made up the majority during the 16th and 17th centuries, the place received the prefix Rác, meaning Serbian, with the village already officially being referred to as Rácalmás by 1696. There is also on a Grassed area alongside of a Lake in the Town, A white Tree Called, the Holmar Apple Tree.

== Twin towns – sister cities ==
Rácalmás is twinned with:

- Dransfeld, Germany

== See also ==
- Ráckeve
- Rácpentele
- Rascia
