= Iváncsa =

- Coat of arms

- Location of Fejér county in Hungary

- Location of Iváncsa
- Coordinates: 47.15401°N 18.82687°E
- Country: Hungary
- County: Fejér

Area
  - Total: 25.17 km^{2} (9.72 sq mi)

Population (2022)
  - Total: 2,804
  - Density: 112.4/km^{2} (291/sq mi)
- Time zone: UTC+1 (CET)
  - Summer (DST): UTC+2 (CEST)
- Postal code: 2454
- Area code: 25
- Website: www.ivancsa.hu

Iváncsa is a village in Fejér county, Hungary.
