= Veszprém County 4th constituency =

Parliamentary constituency in Hungary

- Constituency for the National Assembly
- Location of Veszprém county 04 within Veszprém county

- Location of Veszprém county within Hungary
- County: Veszprém County
- Population: 82,484 (2022)
- Major settlements: Pápa

Current constituency
- Created: 2011
- Party: Tisza Party
- Member: Szilvia Ujvári
- Elected: 2026

The Veszprém County 4th parliamentary constituency is one of the 106 constituencies into which the territory of Hungary is divided by Act CCIII of 2011, and in which voters can elect one member of parliament. The standard abbreviation of the name of the constituency is: Veszprém 04. OEVK. Seat: Pápa.

== Area ==
The constituency includes the following settlements:

1. Adásztevel
2. Adorjánháza
3. Apácatorna
4. Bakonybél
5. Bakonyjákó
6. Bakonykoppány
7. Bakonyoszlop
8. Bakonypölöske
9. Bakonyság
10. Bakonyszentiván
11. Bakonyszentkirály
12. Bakonyszücs
13. Bakonytamási
14. Béb
15. Békás
16. Borszörcsök
17. Borzavár
18. Csesznek
19. Csót
20. Csögle
21. Dabrony
22. Dáka
23. Devecser
24. Doba
25. Döbrönte
26. Egeralja
27. Egyházaskesző
28. Farkasgyepű
29. Ganna
30. Gecse
31. Gic
32. Homokbödöge
33. Iszkáz
34. Kamond
35. Karakószörcsök
36. Kemeneshőgyész
37. Kemenesszentpéter
38. Kerta
39. Kisberzseny
40. Kiscsősz
41. Kispirit
42. Kisszőlős
43. Kolontár
44. Kup
45. Külsővat
46. Lovászpatona
47. Magyargencs
48. Magyarpolány
49. Malomsok
50. Marcalgergelyi
51. Marcaltő
52. Mezőlak
53. Mihályháza
54. Nagyacsád
55. Nagyalásony
56. Nagydém
57. Nagyesztergár
58. Nagygyimót
59. Nagypirit
60. Nagytevel
61. Nemesgörzsöny
62. Nemesszalók
63. Németbánya
64. Nóráp
65. Noszlop
66. Nyárád
67. Oroszi
68. Pápa
69. Pápadereske
70. Pápakovácsi
71. Pápasalamon
72. Pápateszér
73. Pénzesgyőr
74. Porva
75. Somlójenő
76. Somlószőlős
77. Somlóvásárhely
78. Somlóvecse
79. Takácsi
80. Tüskevár
81. Ugod
82. Vanyola
83. Várkesző
84. Vaszar
85. Vid
86. Vinár
87. Zirc

== Members of parliament ==
Name	Party	Term	Election
Zoltán Kovács	Fidesz-KDNP	2014 – 2025	Results of the 2014 parliamentary election:
Zoltán Kovács	Fidesz-KDNP	2014 – 2025	Results of the 2018 parliamentary election:
Zoltán Kovács	Fidesz-KDNP	2014 – 2025	Results of the 2022 parliamentary election:
Szilvia Ujvári	Tisza Party	2026 – present	Results of the 2026 parliamentary election: 48.58%

== Demographics ==
Historical population
Year	Pop.	±%
2011	88,339	—
2022	82,484	−6.6%

The demographics of the constituency are as follows. The population of constituency No. 4 of Veszprém County was 82,484 on October 1, 2022. The population of the constituency decreased by 5,855 between the 2011 and 2022 censuses. Based on the age composition, the majority of the population in the constituency is middle-aged with 30,049 people, while the least is children with 14,373 people. 80.5% of the population of the constituency has internet access.

According to the highest level of completed education, those with a skilled worker's degree live the largest number of people, 21,368 people, followed by those with a high school diploma, with 20,130 people.

According to economic activity, almost half of the population is employed, 40,370 people, the second most significant group is inactive earners, who are mainly pensioners, with 20,706 people.

The most significant ethnic group in the constituency is German with 1,782 people and Gypsy with 949 people. The proportion of foreign citizens without Hungarian citizenship is 1.5%.

According to religious composition, the largest religion of the residents of the constituency is Roman Catholic (26,731 people), and a significant community is the Calvinists (6,136 people). The number of those not belonging to a religious community is also significant (4,475 people), the third largest group in the constituency after the Roman Catholic and Calvinist religions.

== Sources ==
- ↑ Vjt.: "2011. évi CCIII. törvény az országgyűlési képviselők választásáról". Nemzeti Jogszabálytár. Magyar Közlöny Lap- és Könyvkiadó Kft.
- ↑ KSH: "Az országgyűlési egyéni választókerületek adatai". Népszámlálás 2011. Központi Statisztikai Hivatal.
