= Devecser District =

Devecser District Devecseri járás
- Districts of Hungary
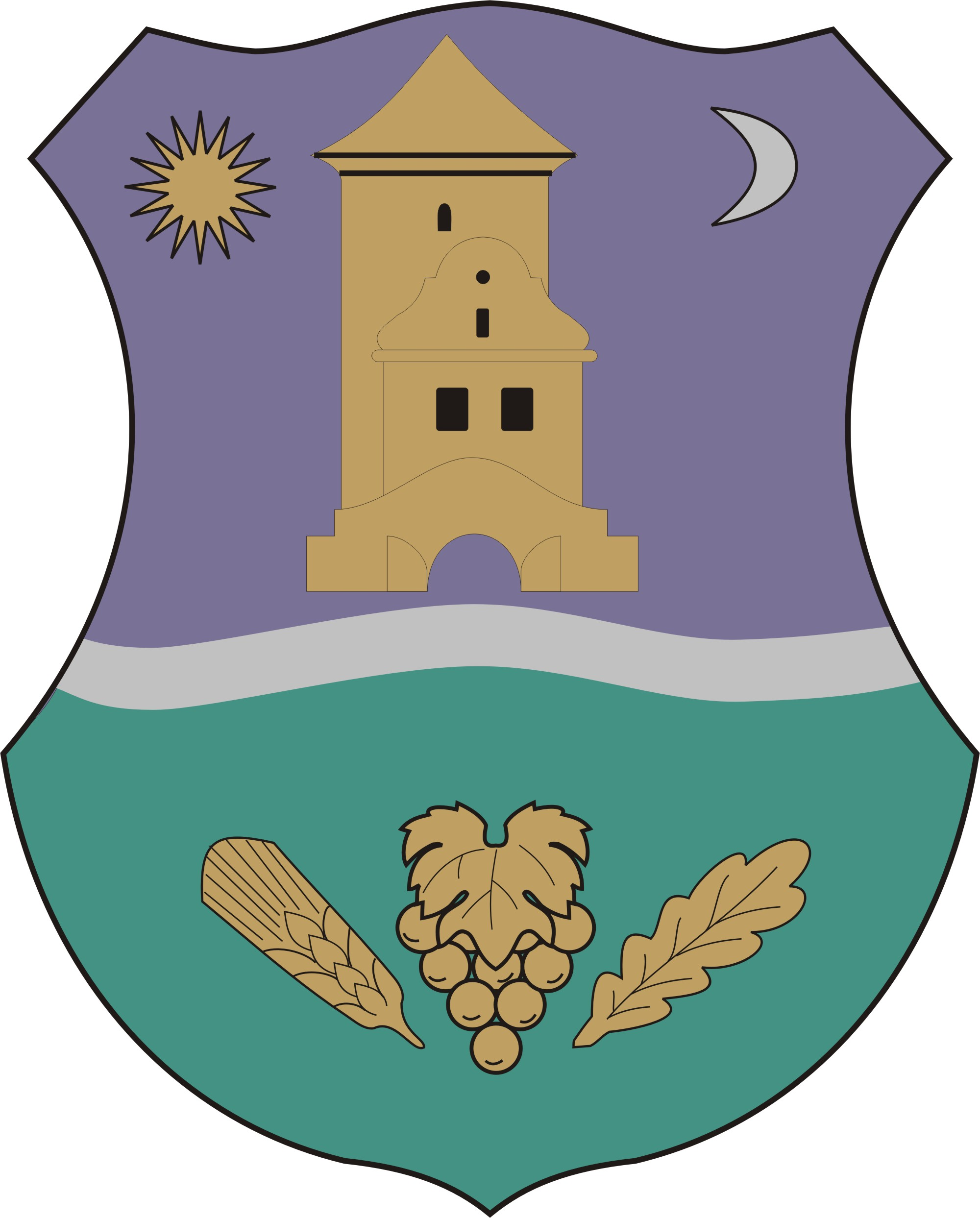
- Coat of arms

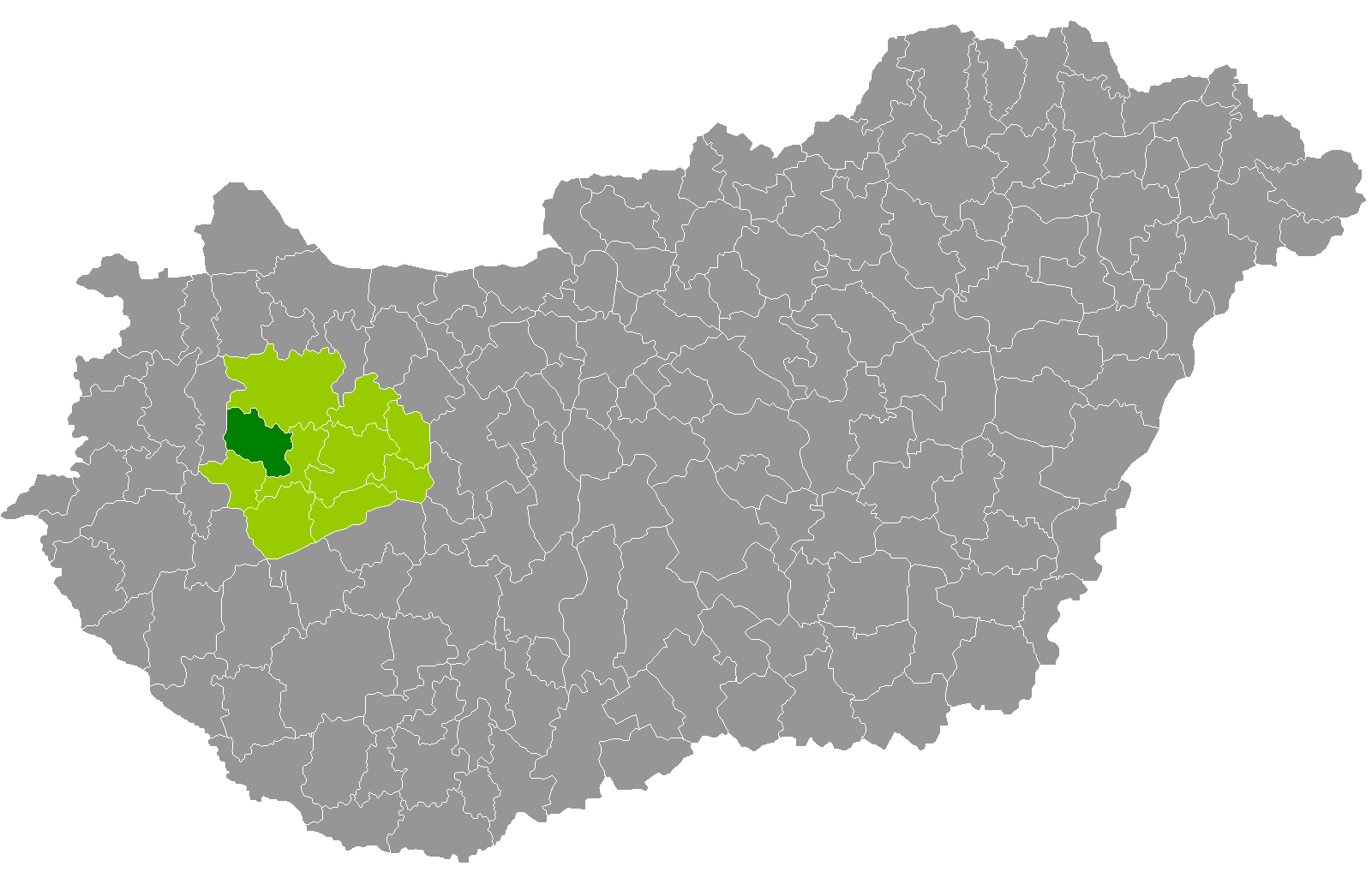
- Devecser District within Hungary and Veszprém County.
- Coordinates: 47.10°N 17.44°E
- Country: Hungary
- County: Veszprém
- District seat: Devecser

Area
  - Total: 421.73 km^{2} (162.83 sq mi)
  - Rank: 4th in Veszprém

Population (2011 census)
  - Total: 15,079
  - Rank: 10th in Veszprém
  - Density: 36/km^{2} (93/sq mi)

Devecser District (Hungarian: Devecseri járás) is a district in the western part of Veszprém County. 'Devecser is also the name of the town where the district seat is found. The district is located in the Central Transdanubia Statistical Region.

== Geography ==
Devecser District borders Pápa District to the north, Ajka District to the east, Sümeg District to the south, Celldömölk District (Vas County) to the west. The number of the inhabited places in Devecser District is 28.

== Municipalities ==
The district has one town and 27 villages, as follows (with population on 1 January 2013)

- Adorjánháza (389)
- Apácatorna (173)
- Borszörcsök (386)
- Csögle (629)
- Dabrony (361)
- **Devecser** (4,427) – district seat
- Doba (470)
- Egeralja (230)
- Iszkáz (342)
- Kamond (430)
- Karakószörcsök (261)
- Kerta (625)
- Kisberzseny (87)
- Kiscsősz (108)
- Kispirit (68)
- Kisszőlős (131)
- Kolontár (690)
- Nagyalásony (466)
- Nagypirit (255)
- Noszlop (982)
- Oroszi (136)
- Pusztamiske (415)
- Somlójenő (301)
- Somlószőlős (674)
- Somlóvásárhely (1,153)
- Somlóvecse (75)
- Tüskevár (564)
- Vid (120)

The bolded municipality is city.

== See also ==
- List of cities and towns in Hungary
