= Veszprémgalsa =

- Flag Coat of arms

- Location of Veszprémgalsa
- Coordinates: 47.09343°N 17.26848°E
- Country: Hungary
- County: Veszprém

Area
  - Total: 8.71 km^{2} (3.36 sq mi)

Population (2004)
  - Total: 301
  - Density: 34.55/km^{2} (89.5/sq mi)
- Time zone: UTC+1 (CET)
  - Summer (DST): UTC+2 (CEST)
- Postal code: 8475
- Area code: 87

Veszprémgalsa is a village in Veszprém county, in the district of Sümeg. Prior to 1969 it was referred to as Galsa or Zalagalsa, Zala being the former county affiliation. However, in 1969 the villages of Veszprémpinkóc and Zalagalsa were combined creating Veszprémgalsa.

== History ==
The name Galsa is derived from the Galsa personal name derived from Slavic origin, and the Zala prefix refers to the former county affiliation. First mentioned in 1268. Near the end of the 14th century, the estate of Benedek Himfi was sold by sale. At that time, approx. 1500 hold. The estate of the Himfiek was owned by Ferenc Esegvári. From 1420 the village of Csabi Bazsó owns the village. The two families held it until the end of the 16th century . In 1627 a part of the village was in Eszterházy, and the other was in the hands of public owners. From the noble society of Galsa, the Polgar family stands out, (in 1700 Istvan Polgár was listed as a nobleman and one of Galsa's holders). The settlement was a serf village in the 16th and 17th centuries. In the middle of the 1660s the village was depopulated. In 1700 and 1711, Galsa resided again, and settled permanently in the 1720s. Livelihoods of the village are farming and livestock breeding. The village has a large millstone. In 1366, three mills were recorded in the water of Sárosd, and in 1662 there was a water mill at the eastern end of the village in the direction of the village of Sárosd. In 1724 it was mentioned in the name of Kőmalom, and in 1799 the two-wheeled mills were mentioned. The population of the population grew from the 1720s. In 1890 he had five hundred inhabitants. This number was only overwhelmed after the merger with Veszprémpinkóc, and the population has been declining since then. In 1773, Galsa's people were Hungarian and free. In 1700, its population was declared evangelical, and later the number of Catholics grew. In 1778 a new church was built in honor of Peter and Paul. The population of the village was less developed during the 19th century, and in 1890 it had five hundred inhabitants. In 1949, 74% of the population lived in agriculture, and 97 of the active earners were commuters. The organization began in 1959, essentially from that point on, the stationary way of life began to disappear.

Veszprémpinkóc's name is also of Slavic origin. The Pinkóc name was first recorded in 1764, noblemen, most of them Catholics. In 1785 he belonged as a daughters to Tüskevár. In 1785 he had 119 inhabitants. A map made in 1797 marks the settlement as Tornapinkóck . As a separate municipality, the Austrian, then the 1869 . year-old population census, at which time 172 people lived here. Its border (129 moons) was later abolished in the Apacatorna area. It was a dense village in 1941 with 211 inhabitants. He remained independent during the council elections, even though he was fully integrated with Zalagas. Prior to his merger, he had a small council with joint counsel.

Veszprémpinkóc and Zalagalsa became a village under the name of Veszprémgalsa ( 1969), [3] and also a common headquarters, to which Hosztót, Szentimrefalva and Zalaszegvár belonged as a community. [4] The joint council was merged with the independent council of Csabrends in 1977, and the new headquarters became the latter municipality.

In 1970, Veszprémgals had 564 inhabitants, with four streets and 150 residential units. The majority of the population worked in the mines in Ajka and in industrial plants, in the local and regional units, and the main activity was animal breeding and farming. The electricity was inflamed in the village in 1949.

Since 1990, it has an autonomous local government, it belongs to the Csabrendek district notary. The village has covered wastes with water, gas, telephone network and paved roads. Institutions: club library, doctor's office, village hall.

== Polgár Family ==
The Polgár family were the primary noble family of Galsa. On March 20, 1640 King Ferdinand III granted Count György Polgár de Galsa (György galsai Polgár in Hungarian) the village of Galsa. The Polgár family heirs are the descendants of Matthias Polgár de Galsa of Sisak Croatia and Andor Polgár de Galsa in Budapest.
