= Hajmáskér =

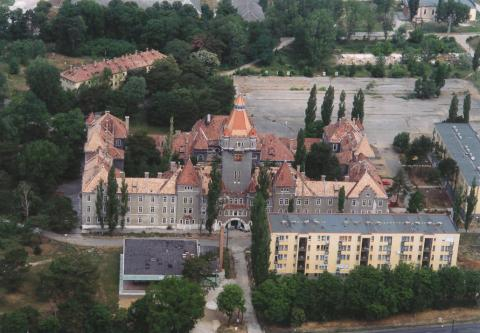

- Flag Coat of arms

- Location of Hajmáskér in Hungary
- Coordinates: 47.1478°N 18.0222°E
- Country: Hungary
- Region: Central Transdanubia
- County: Veszprém

Area
  - Total: 38.14 km^{2} (14.73 sq mi)

Population (2012)
  - Total: 3,064
  - Density: 80.34/km^{2} (208.1/sq mi)
- Time zone: UTC+1 (CET)
  - Summer (DST): UTC+2 (CEST)
- Postal code: 8192
- Area code: +36 88
- Website: https://hajmasker.hu/

Hajmáskér is a village in Veszprém county, Hungary.
