= Szilvia Ujvári =

Hungarian politician

Member of the National Assembly
- Assuming office 9 May 2026
- Succeeding: Zoltán Kovács
- Constituency: Veszprém 4th

Personal details
- Party: Tisza

Szilvia Ujvári is a Hungarian politician who was elected member of the National Assembly in 2026 representing the Veszprém County 4th constituency. She previously worked as a foreign trade manager.
