= Öskü =

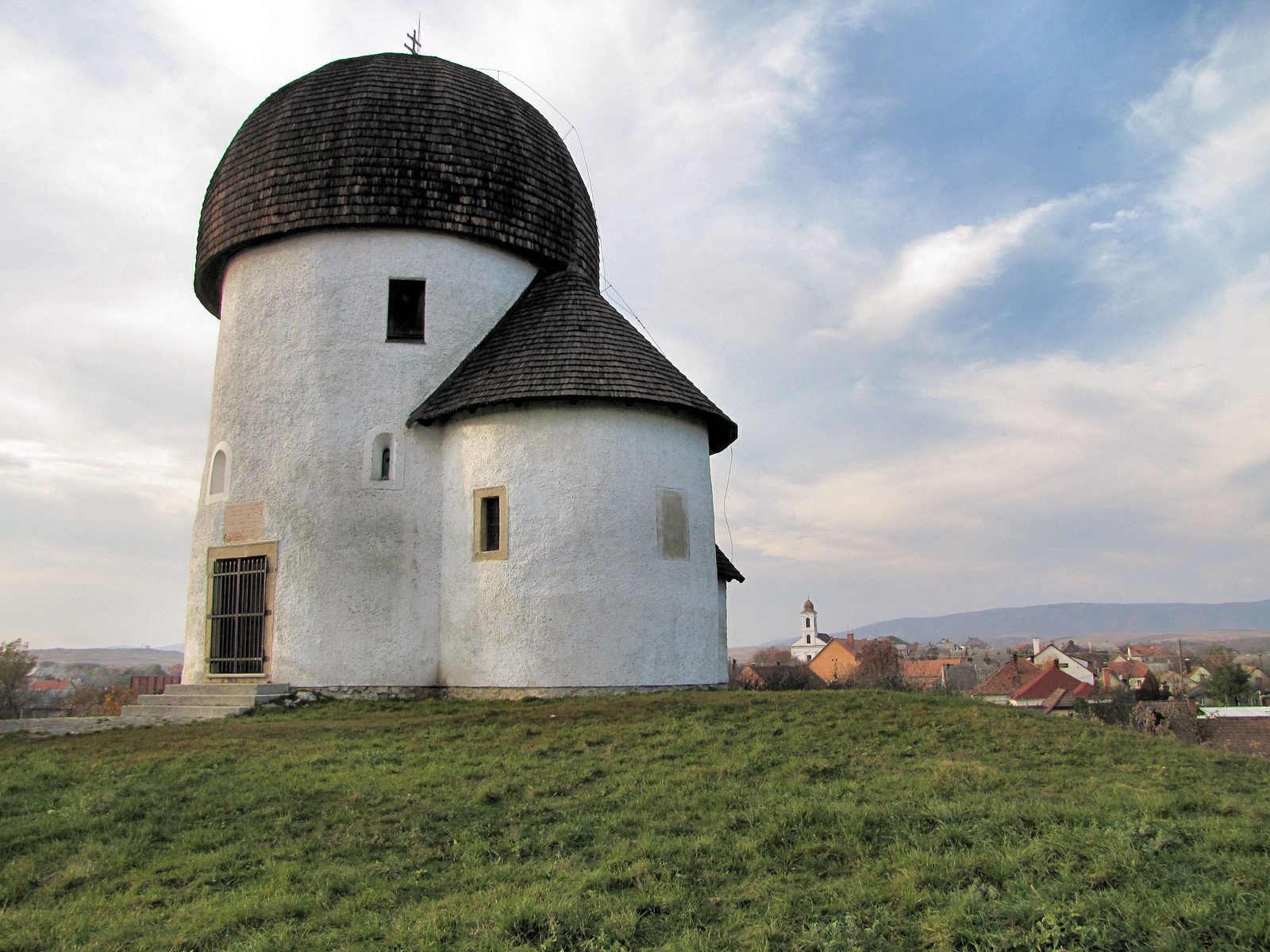

- Flag Coat of arms

- Location of Veszprém county in Hungary

- Location of Öskü
- Coordinates: 47.16084°N 18.07195°E
- Country: Hungary
- County: Veszprém

Area
  - Total: 48.3 km^{2} (18.6 sq mi)

Population (2004)
  - Total: 2,309
  - Density: 47.8/km^{2} (124/sq mi)
- Time zone: UTC+1 (CET)
  - Summer (DST): UTC+2 (CEST)
- Postal code: 8191
- Area code: 88

Öskü (pronounced [ˈøʃky]) is a village in Veszprém county, Hungary.

== Sightseeings ==
The rotunda stands in the centre of the village on the top of the hill. The apse is oriented to the east. The rotunda of Öskü is a singularity in Hungary. Probably it was built in the 11th-12th century.
