= Gic =

Village in Veszprém, Hungary

Gic275px
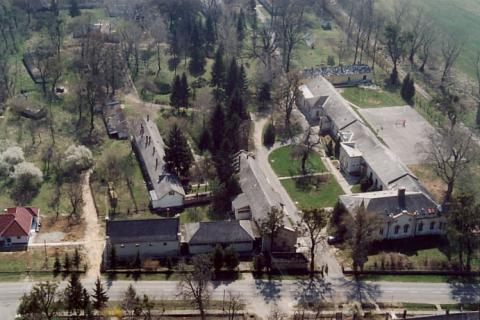
- Aerial photography of Gic

- Flag Coat of arms

- Location of Veszprém county in Hungary

- Location of Gic
- Coordinates: 47.43188°N 17.75358°E
- Country: Hungary
- County: Veszprém

Area
  - Total: 19.68 km^{2} (7.60 sq mi)

Population (2004)
  - Total: 505
  - Density: 25.66/km^{2} (66.5/sq mi)
- Time zone: UTC+1 (CET)
  - Summer (DST): UTC+2 (CEST)
- Postal code: 8435
- Area code: 88

gic

Gic is a village in Veszprém County, Hungary.
