= Pénzesgyőr =

- Flag Coat of arms

- Location of Veszprém county in Hungary

- Location of Pénzesgyőr
- Coordinates: 47.22938°N 17.78927°E
- Country: Hungary
- County: Veszprém

Area
  - Total: 17.65 km^{2} (6.81 sq mi)

Population (2004)
  - Total: 367
  - Density: 20.79/km^{2} (53.8/sq mi)
- Time zone: UTC+1 (CET)
  - Summer (DST): UTC+2 (CEST)
- Postal code: 8426
- Area code: 88

Pénzesgyőr (Hungarian pronunciation: [ˈpeːnzɛʒɟøːr]) is a village in Veszprém county, Hungary in Zirc District.
