= Nagygyimót =

- Flag Coat of arms

- Location of Veszprém county in Hungary

- Location of Nagygyimót
- Coordinates: 47.33992°N 17.55017°E
- Country: Hungary
- County: Veszprém

Area
  - Total: 23.43 km^{2} (9.05 sq mi)

Population (2004)
  - Total: 587
  - Density: 25.05/km^{2} (64.9/sq mi)
- Time zone: UTC+1 (CET)
  - Summer (DST): UTC+2 (CEST)
- Postal code: 8551
- Area code: 89

Nagygyimót is a village in Veszprém county, Hungary.
