= Pápasalamon =

- Flag Coat of arms

- Location of Veszprém county in Hungary

- Location of Pápasalamon
- Coordinates: 47.22726°N 17.42332°E
- Country: Hungary
- County: Veszprém

Government
  - Mayor: Nepusz Nándor (Ind.)

Area
  - Total: 13.96 km^{2} (5.39 sq mi)

Population (2022)
  - Total: 331
  - Density: 23.7/km^{2} (61.4/sq mi)
- Time zone: UTC+1 (CET)
  - Summer (DST): UTC+2 (CEST)
- Postal code: 8594
- Area code: 89

Pápasalamon is a village in Veszprém county, Hungary.
