= Nagytevel =

Village in Veszprém, Hungary

- Location of Veszprém county in Hungary

- Location of Nagytevel
- Coordinates: 47.29457°N 17.56888°E
- Country: Hungary
- County: Veszprém

Area
  - Total: 14.41 km^{2} (5.56 sq mi)

Population (2004)
  - Total: 551
  - Density: 38.23/km^{2} (99.0/sq mi)
- Time zone: UTC+1 (CET)
  - Summer (DST): UTC+2 (CEST)
- Postal code: 8562
- Area code: 89

Nagytevel is a village in Veszprém county, Hungary.

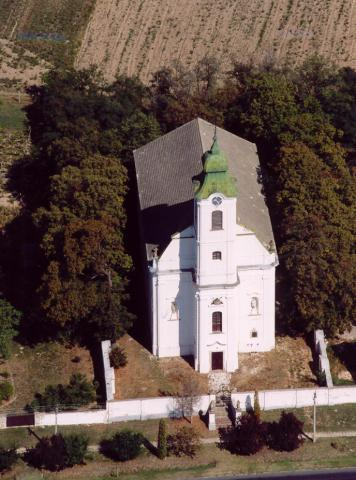
Aerial photography of a church in Nagytevel
