= Várkesző =

- Location of Veszprém county in Hungary

- Location of Várkesző
- Coordinates: 47.42904°N 17.31536°E
- Country: Hungary
- County: Veszprém

Area
  - Total: 6.41 km^{2} (2.47 sq mi)

Population (2004)
  - Total: 211
  - Density: 32.91/km^{2} (85.2/sq mi)
- Time zone: UTC+1 (CET)
  - Summer (DST): UTC+2 (CEST)
- Postal code: 8523
- Area code: 89

Várkesző is a village in Veszprém county, Hungary.

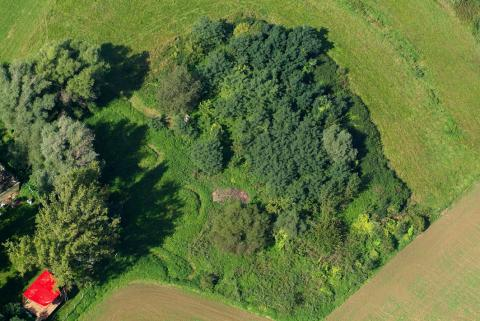
Aerial photography of Várkesző
