= Kemeneshőgyész =

- Location of Veszprém county in Hungary

- Location of Kemeneshőgyész
- Coordinates: 47.35652°N 17.29464°E
- Country: Hungary
- County: Veszprém

Area
  - Total: 26.08 km^{2} (10.07 sq mi)

Population (2004)
  - Total: 574
  - Density: 22/km^{2} (57/sq mi)
- Time zone: UTC+1 (CET)
  - Summer (DST): UTC+2 (CEST)
- Postal code: 8516
- Area code: 89

Kemeneshőgyész is a village in Veszprém county, Hungary.

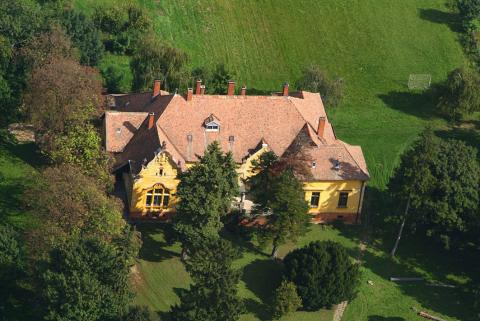
Aerial photography of a palace in Kemeneshőgyész
