= Magyarpolány =

Village in Hungary

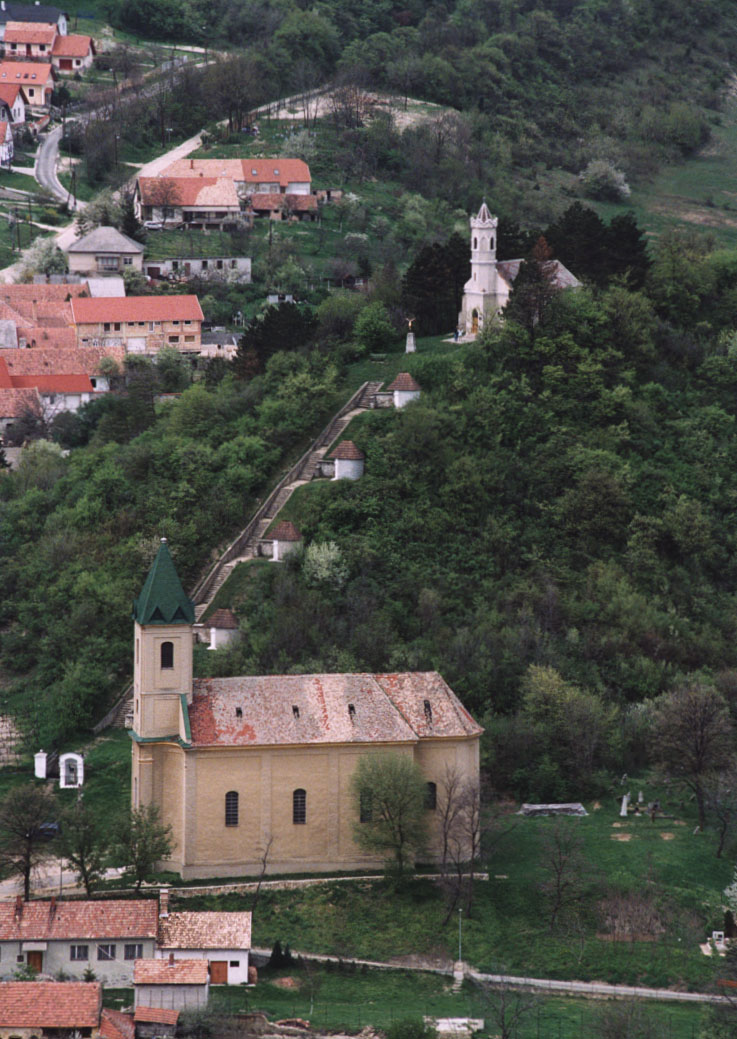
- Aerial photography of Magyarpolány

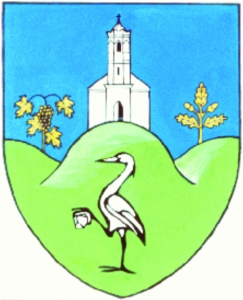
- Coat of arms

- Location of Veszprém county in Hungary

- Location of Magyarpolány
- Coordinates: 47.17024°N 17.54655°E
- Country: Hungary
- County: Veszprém

Area
  - Total: 26.97 km^{2} (10.41 sq mi)

Population (2004)
  - Total: 1,198
  - Density: 44.41/km^{2} (115.0/sq mi)
- Time zone: UTC+1 (CET)
  - Summer (DST): UTC+2 (CEST)
- Postal code: 8449
- Area code: 88

Magyarpolány is a village in Veszprém county, Hungary.
