= Pápadereske =

- Flag Coat of arms

- Location of Veszprém county in Hungary

- Location of Pápadereske
- Coordinates: 47.29434°N 17.39957°E
- Country: Hungary
- County: Veszprém

Area
  - Total: 5.71 km^{2} (2.20 sq mi)

Population (2004)
  - Total: 280
  - Density: 49.03/km^{2} (127.0/sq mi)
- Time zone: UTC+1 (CET)
  - Summer (DST): UTC+2 (CEST)
- Postal code: 8593
- Area code: 89

Pápadereske is a village in Veszprém county, Hungary.
