= Mezőlak =

- Flag Coat of arms

- Location of Veszprém county in Hungary

- Location of Mezőlak
- Coordinates: 47.33133°N 17.37026°E
- Country: Hungary
- County: Veszprém

Area
  - Total: 21.57 km^{2} (8.33 sq mi)

Population (2004)
  - Total: 1,071
  - Density: 49.65/km^{2} (128.6/sq mi)
- Time zone: UTC+1 (CET)
  - Summer (DST): UTC+2 (CEST)
- Postal code: 8514
- Area code: 89

Mezőlak is a village in Veszprém county, Hungary.

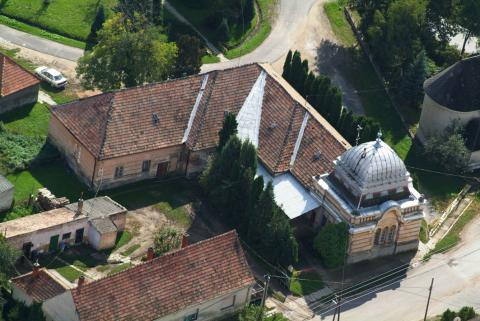
Mezőlak from above
