= Nóráp =

- Location of Veszprém county in Hungary

- Location of Nóráp
- Coordinates: 47.27322°N 17.4576°E
- Country: Hungary
- County: Veszprém

Area
  - Total: 7.58 km^{2} (2.93 sq mi)

Population (2004)
  - Total: 220
  - Density: 29.02/km^{2} (75.2/sq mi)
- Time zone: UTC+1 (CET)
  - Summer (DST): UTC+2 (CEST)
- Postal code: 8591
- Area code: 89

Nóráp is a village in Veszprém county, Hungary.
