= Nemesszalók =

- Flag Coat of arms

- Location of Veszprém county in Hungary

- Location of Nemesszalók
- Coordinates: 47.27538°N 17.30152°E
- Country: Hungary
- County: Veszprém

Area
  - Total: 20.56 km^{2} (7.94 sq mi)

Population (2004)
  - Total: 1,011
  - Density: 49.17/km^{2} (127.3/sq mi)
- Time zone: UTC+1 (CET)
  - Summer (DST): UTC+2 (CEST)
- Postal code: 9533
- Area code: 89

Nemesszalók is a village in Veszprém county, Hungary.
