= Kemenesszentpéter =

- Location of Veszprém county in Hungary

- Location of Kemenesszentpéter
- Country: Hungary
- County: Veszprém

Area
  - Total: 21.35 km^{2} (8.24 sq mi)

Population (2004)
  - Total: 739
  - Density: 34.61/km^{2} (89.6/sq mi)
- Time zone: UTC+1 (CET)
  - Summer (DST): UTC+2 (CEST)
- Postal code: 8518
- Area code: 89

Kemenesszentpéter is a village in Veszprém county, Hungary.
