= Ganna, Hungary =

Ganna Ganna
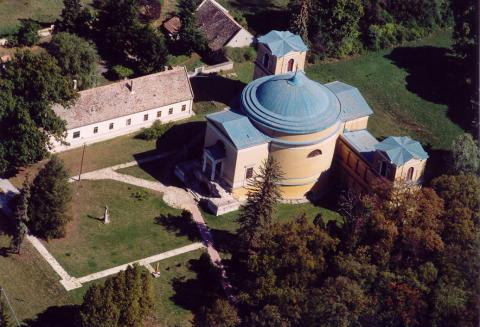
- The mausoleum of the Esterházy family

- Flag Coat of arms

- Location of Ganna in Hungary
- Coordinates: 47.2337°N 17.5301°E
- Country: Hungary
- Region: Central Transdanubia
- County: Veszprém

Area
  - Total: 15.47 km^{2} (5.97 sq mi)

Population (2012)
  - Total: 243
  - Density: 15.7/km^{2} (40.7/sq mi)
- Time zone: UTC+1 (CET)
  - Summer (DST): UTC+2 (CEST)
- Postal code: 8597
- Area code: +36 89
- Website: http://ganna.hu/

Ganna (German: Ganna) is a village in Veszprém County, Hungary.
