= Veszprém County =

County of Hungary

Coordinates: 47°10′N 17°45′E

Veszprém County Veszprém megye
- Counties of Hungary
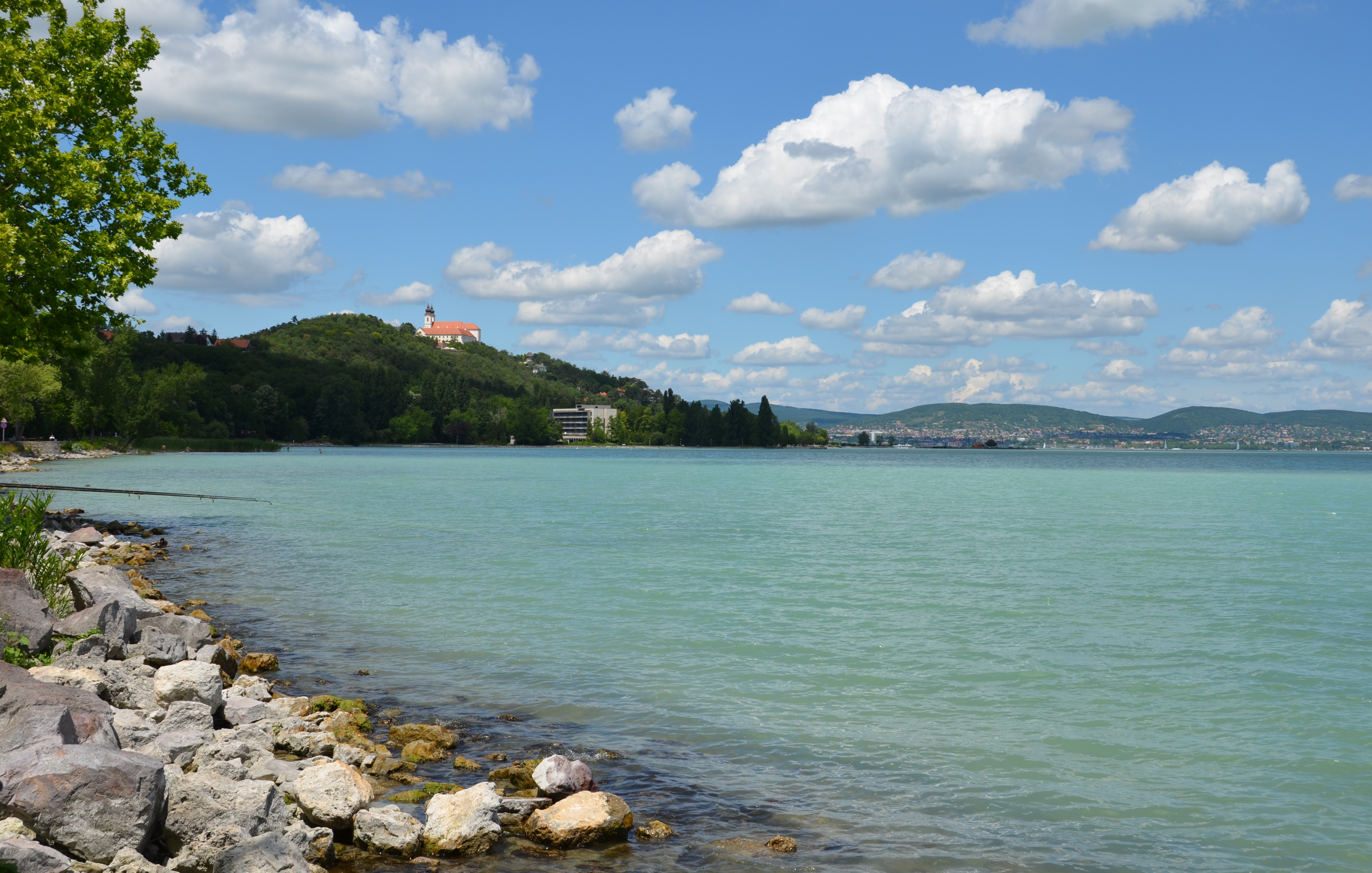
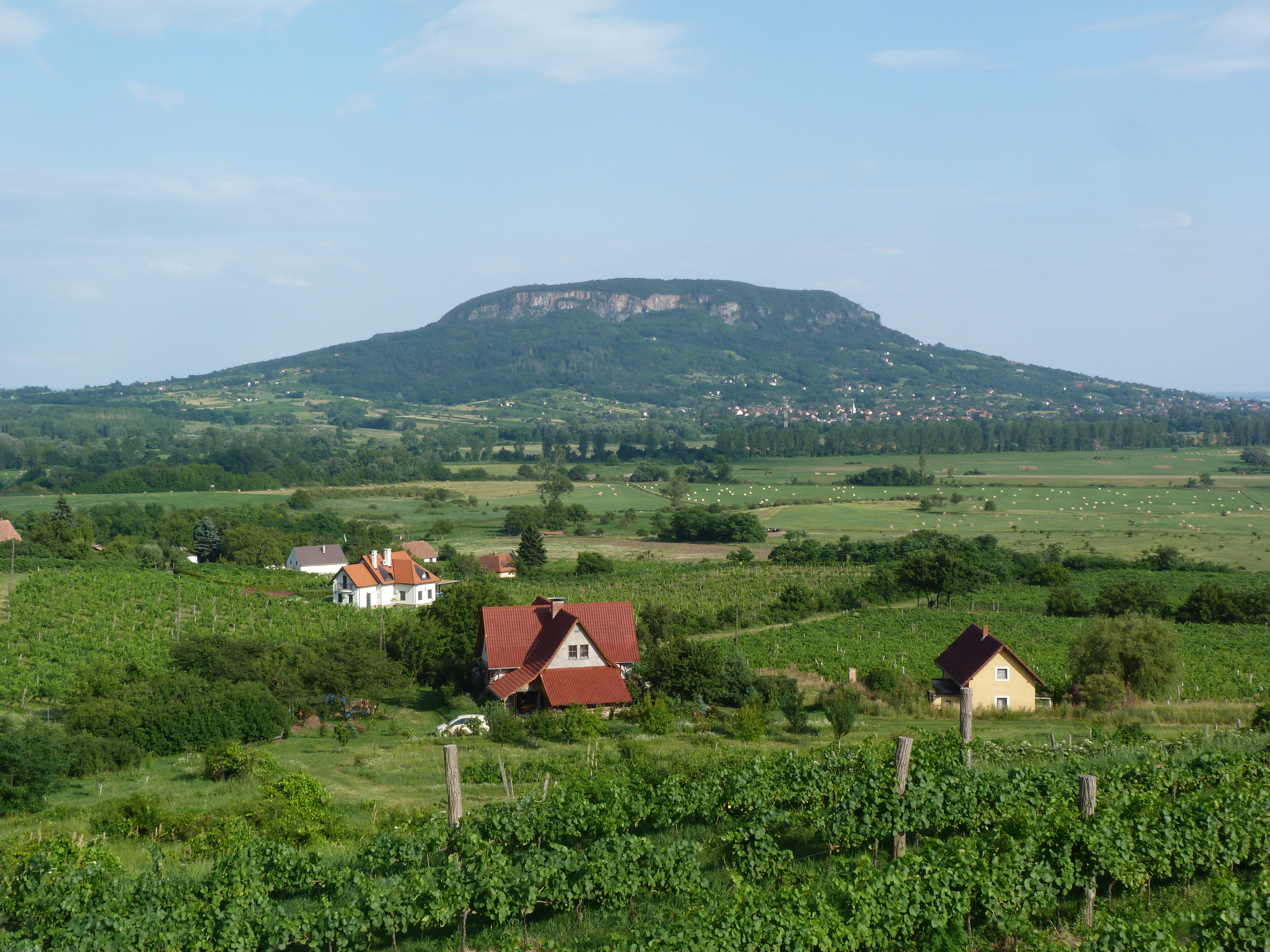
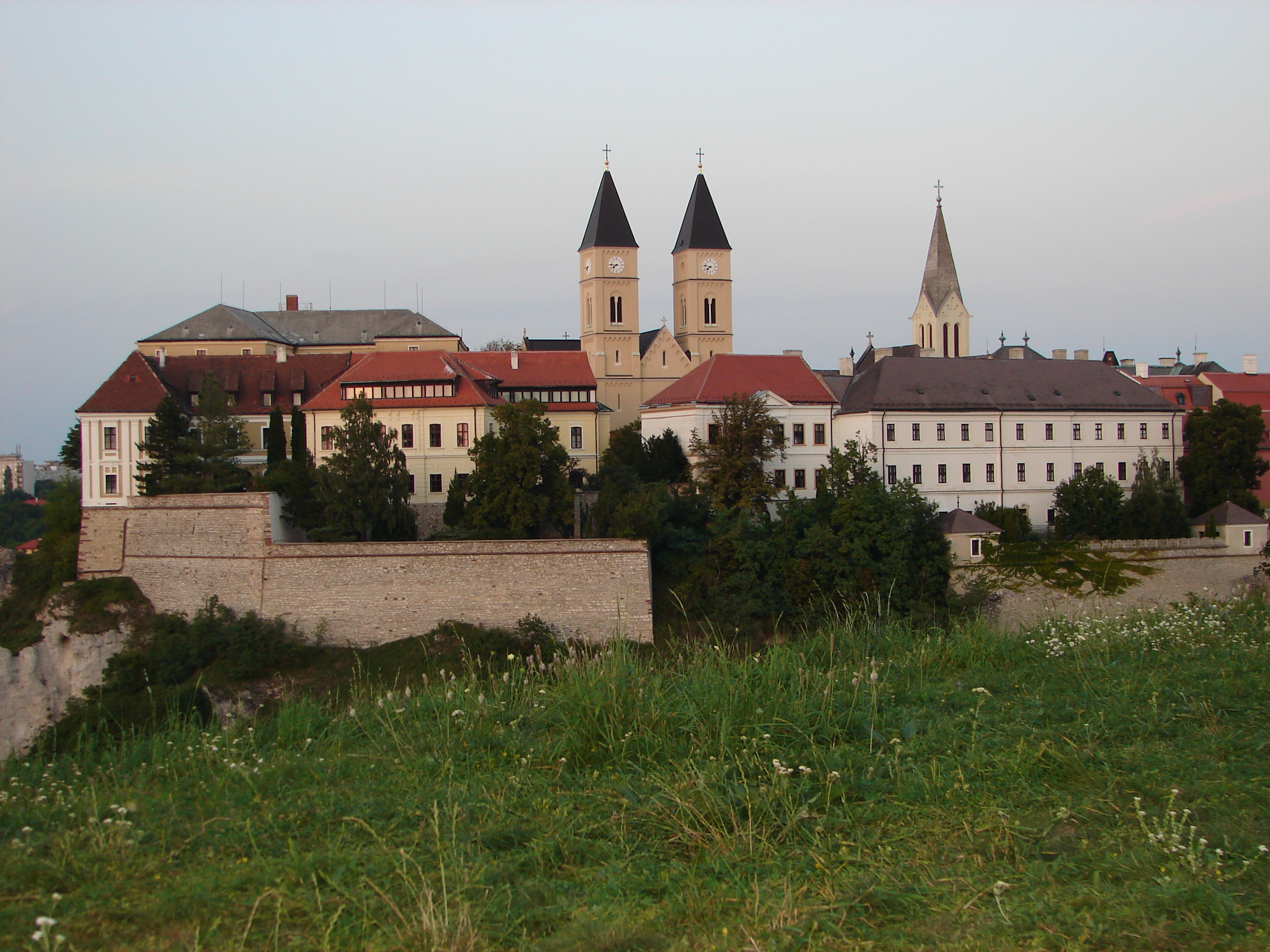
- Descending, from top: View of Tihany Abbey from Lake Balaton, Badacsony Mountain, and Castle of Veszprém

- Flag Coat of arms

- Veszprém County within Hungary
- Country: Hungary
- Region: Central Transdanubia
- County seat: Veszprém
- Districts: 10 districts: Ajka District; Balatonalmádi District; Balatonfüred District; Devecser District; Pápa District; Sümeg District; Tapolca District; Várpalota District; Veszprém District; Zirc District

Government
  - President of the General Assembly: Imre Polgárdy (Fidesz-KDNP)

Area
  - Total: 4,463.65 km^{2} (1,723.42 sq mi)
  - Rank: 9th in Hungary

Population (2018)
  - Total: 341,425
  - Rank: 12th in Hungary
  - Density: 76.4901/km^{2} (198.108/sq mi)

GDP
  - Total: HUF 936 billion €3.006 billion (2016)
- Postal code: 810x, 816x – 819x, 830x – 8352, 84xx – 85xx
- Area code(s): (+36) 87, 88, 89
- ISO 3166 code: HU-VE
- Website: vpvarmegye.hu

Veszprém (Hungarian: Veszprém megye, pronounced [ˈvɛspreːm]; German: Komitat Wesprim (Weißbrunn)) is an administrative county (megye) in Hungary. Veszprém is also the name of the capital city of Veszprém county.

== Veszprém county ==
Veszprém county lies in western Hungary. It covers the Bakony hills and the northern shore of Lake Balaton. It shares borders with the Hungarian counties Vas, Győr-Moson-Sopron, Komárom-Esztergom, Fejér, Somogy and Zala. The capital of Veszprém county is Veszprém. The river Marcal runs along part of its western border. Its area is 4,613 km².

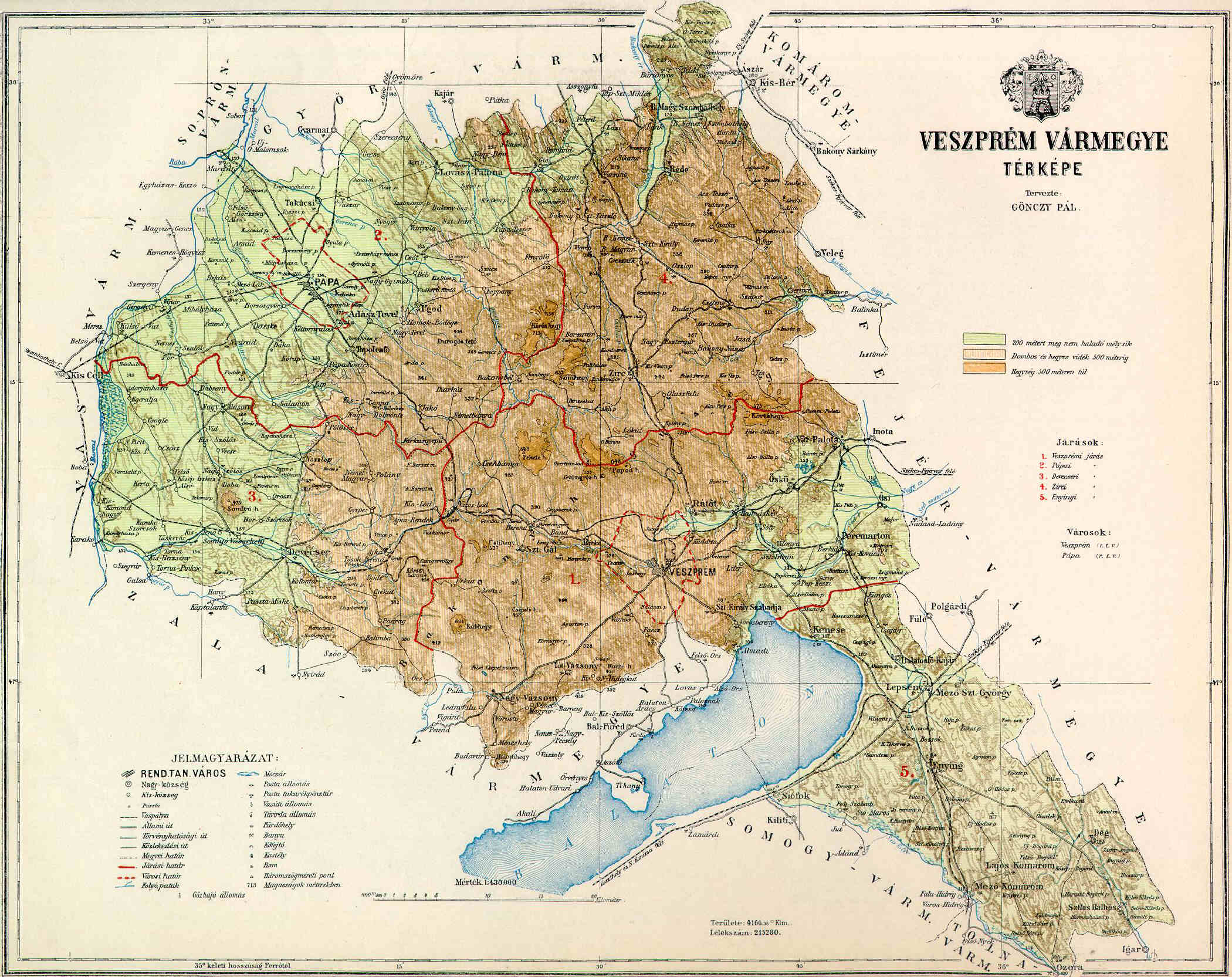
Veszprém County on an old map

== Demographics ==
Religion in Veszprém County (2022 census – of those who declared their religion (59.9%))
1. Roman Catholic (57.4%)
2. Calvinistic (12.3%)
3. Lutheran (5.00%)
4. Faith Church (0.60%)
5. Greek Catholic (0.50%)
6. Other Christian denomination (3.20%)
7. Other religion (0.40%)
8. Not religious (20.6%)

In 2015, the county had a population of 346,647 and the population density was 77/km².

Year	County population	Change
1949	294,289	Steady
1960	▲337,836	▲14.80%
1970	▲357,830	▲5.92%
1980	▲377,746 (record)	▲5.57%
1990	▼374,466	▼0.87%
2001	▼369,727	▼1.27%
2011	▼353,068	▼4.51%
2015	▼346,647	▼1.85%
2018	▼341,425	▼1.52%

=== Ethnicity ===
Besides the Hungarian majority, the main minorities are the Germans and Roma.

Total population (2011 census): 353,068
Ethnic groups (2011 census): Identified themselves: 315,436 persons:

- Hungarians: 299,410 (94.92%)
- Germans: 8,473 (2.69%)
- Romani: 5,162 (1.64%)
- Others and indefinable: 2,391 (0.76%)

Approximately 51,000 persons in Veszprém County did not declare their ethnic group at the 2011 census.

=== Religion ===
Religious adherence in the county according to 2011 census:

- Catholic – 167,372 (Roman Catholic – 166,597; Greek Catholic – 719);
- Reformed – 30,491;
- Evangelical – 12,813;
- other religions – 4,376;
- Non-religious – 43,171;
- Atheism – 3,915;
- Undeclared – 90,930.

== Regional structure ==
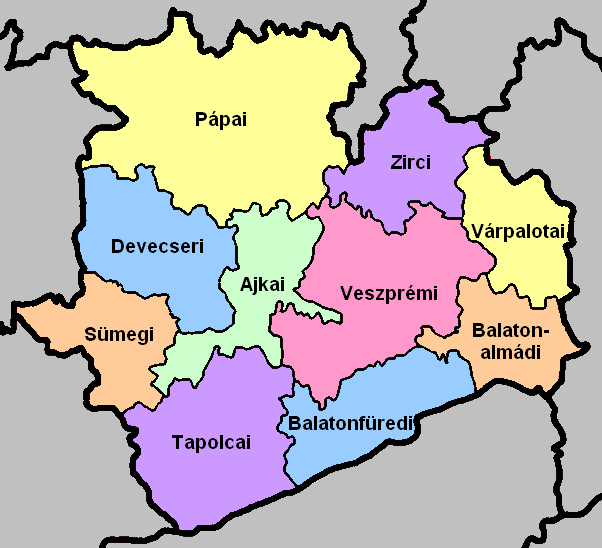
District of Veszprém County

No.	English and Hungarian names	Area (km²)	Population (2011)	Density (pop./km²)	Seat	No. of municipalities
1	Ajka District; Ajkai járás	320.71	39,160	122	Ajka	11
2	Balatonalmádi District; Balatonalmádi járás	239.75	24,330	101	Balatonalmádi	10
3	Balatonfüred District; Balatonfüredi járás	357.75	23,849	67	Balatonfüred	22
4	Devecser District; Devecseri járás	421.73	15,079	36	Devecser	28
5	Pápa District; Pápai járás	1,022.09	59,310	58	Pápa	49
6	Sümeg District; Sümegi járás	306.48	15,358	50	Sümeg	21
7	Tapolca District; Tapolcai járás	540.30	34,256	63	Tapolca	33
8	Várpalota District; Várpalotai járás	294.28	37,882	129	Várpalota	8
9	Veszprém District; Veszprémi járás	629.61	83,288	132	Veszprém (town)	19
10	Zirc District; Zirci járás	331.02	19,386	59	Zirc	15
Veszprém County		4,463.65	353,068	78	Veszprém	217

== Politics ==
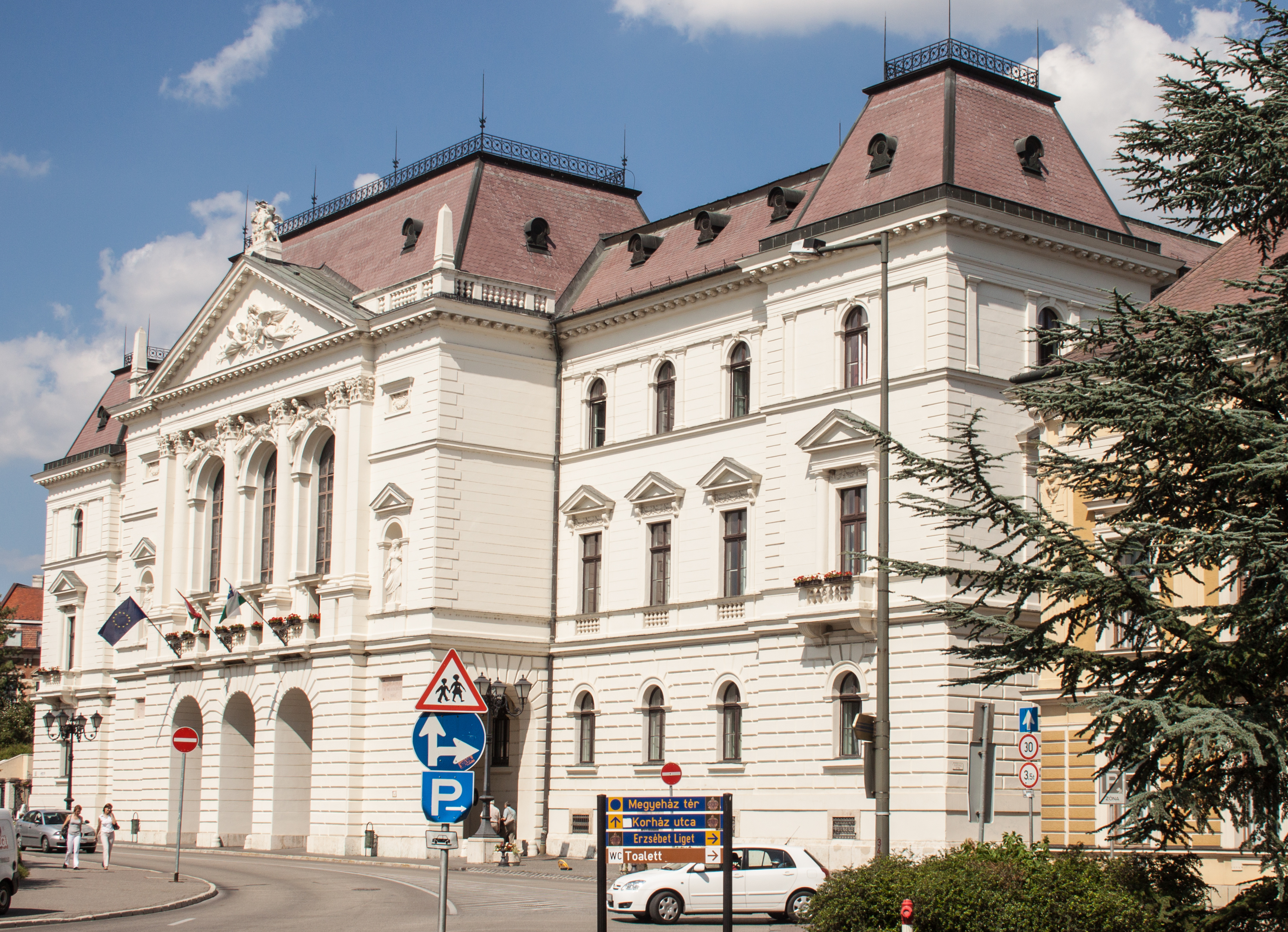
Veszprém County Hall.

The Veszprém County Council, elected at the 2019 local government elections, is made up of 17 counselors, with the following party composition:

Party	Seats	Current County Assembly
Fidesz-KDNP	10	
Jobbik	2	
Democratic Coalition	2	
Hungarian Socialist Party	1	
Our Homeland Movement	1	
Momentum Movement	1	

=== Presidents of the General Assembly ===
List of presidents since 1990
Imre Polgárdy (Fidesz-KDNP)	2014–

== Municipalities ==
Veszprém County has 1 urban county, 14 towns, 2 large villages and 200 villages.

City with county rights

(ordered by population, as of 2011 census)

- Veszprém (61,721) – county seat

Towns

- Pápa (33,583)
- Ajka (31,971)
- Várpalota (21,682)
- Tapolca (17,914)
- Balatonfüred (13,289)
- Balatonalmádi (8,514)
- Zirc (7,445)
- Sümeg (6,847)
- Berhida (5,927)
- Devecser (5,232)
- Balatonfűzfő (4,337)
- Herend (3,446)
- Balatonkenese (3,311)
- Badacsonytomaj (2,312)

Villages

- Adásztevel
- Adorjánháza
- Alsóörs
- Apácatorna
- Aszófő
- Ábrahámhegy
- Badacsonytördemic
- Bakonybél
- Bakonyjákó
- Bakonykoppány
- Bakonynána
- Bakonyoszlop
- Bakonypölöske
- Bakonyság
- Bakonyszentiván
- Bakonyszentkirály
- Bakonyszücs
- Bakonytamási
- Balatonakali
- Balatonakarattya
- Balatoncsicsó
- Balatonederics
- Balatonfőkajár
- Balatonhenye
- Balatonrendes
- Balatonszepezd
- Balatonszőlős
- Balatonudvari
- Barnag
- Bazsi
- Bánd
- Béb
- Békás
- Bodorfa
- Borszörcsök
- Borzavár
- Csabrendek
- Csajág
- Csehbánya
- Csesznek
- Csetény
- Csögle
- Csopak
- Csót
- Dabronc
- Dabrony
- Dáka
- Doba
- Döbrönte
- Dörgicse
- Dudar
- Egeralja
- Egyházaskesző
- Eplény
- Farkasgyepű
- Felsőörs
- Ganna
- Gecse
- Gic
- Gógánfa
- Gyepükaján
- Gyulakeszi
- Hajmáskér
- Halimba
- Hárskút
- Hegyesd
- Hegymagas
- Hetyefő
- Hidegkút
- Homokbödöge
- Hosztót
- Iszkáz
- Jásd
- Kamond
- Kapolcs
- Karakószörcsök
- Káptalanfa
- Káptalantóti
- Kemeneshőgyész
- Kemenesszentpéter
- Kerta
- Kékkút
- Királyszentistván
- Kisapáti
- Kisberzseny
- Kiscsősz
- Kislőd
- Kispirit
- Kisszőlős
- Kolontár
- Köveskál
- Kővágóörs
- Kup
- Külsővat
- Küngös
- Lesencefalu
- Lesenceistvánd
- Lesencetomaj
- Litér
- Lovas
- Lovászpatona
- Lókút
- Magyargencs
- Magyarpolány
- Malomsok
- Marcalgergelyi
- Marcaltő
- Márkó
- Megyer
- Mencshely
- Mezőlak
- Mihályháza
- Mindszentkálla
- Monostorapáti
- Monoszló
- Nagyacsád
- Nagyalásony
- Nagydém
- Nagyesztergár
- Nagygyimót
- Nagypirit
- Nagytevel
- Nagyvázsony
- Nemesgörzsöny
- Nemesgulács
- Nemeshany
- Nemesszalók
- Nemesvámos
- Nemesvita
- Németbánya
- Noszlop
- Nóráp
- Nyárád
- Nyirád
- Olaszfalu
- Oroszi
- Óbudavár
- Öcs
- Örvényes
- Öskü
- Ősi
- Paloznak
- Papkeszi
- Pápadereske
- Pápakovácsi
- Pápasalamon
- Pápateszér
- Pécsely
- Pénzesgyőr
- Pétfürdő
- Porva
- Pula
- Pusztamiske
- Raposka
- Révfülöp
- Rigács
- Salföld
- Sáska
- Somlójenő
- Somlószőlős
- Somlóvásárhely
- Somlóvecse
- Sóly
- Sümegprága
- Szápár
- Szentantalfa
- Szentbékkálla
- Szentgál
- Szentimrefalva
- Szentjakabfa
- Szentkirályszabadja
- Szigliget
- Szőc
- Tagyon
- Takácsi
- Taliándörögd
- Tapolca-Diszel
- Tés
- Tihany
- Tótvázsony
- Tüskevár
- Ugod
- Ukk
- Uzsa
- Úrkút
- Vanyola
- Varsány
- Vaszar
- Várkesző
- Városlőd
- Várpalota
- Vászoly
- Veszprémfajsz
- Veszprémgalsa
- Vid
- Vigántpetend
- Vilonya
- Vinár
- Vöröstó
- Zalaerdőd
- Zalagyömörő
- Zalahaláp
- Zalameggyes
- Zalaszegvár
- Zánka

municipalities are large villages.

== Gallery ==
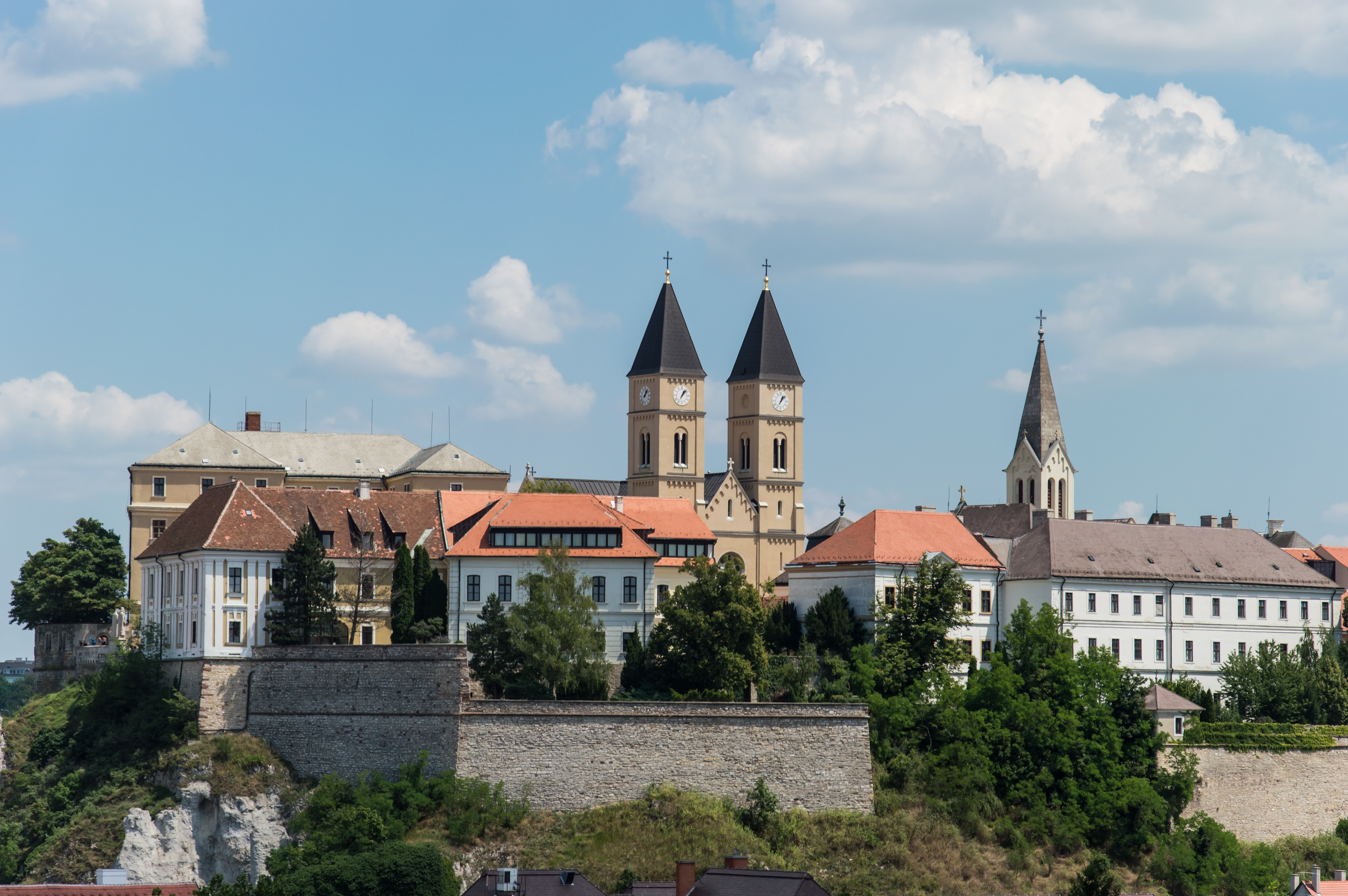
Veszprém, the City of Queens

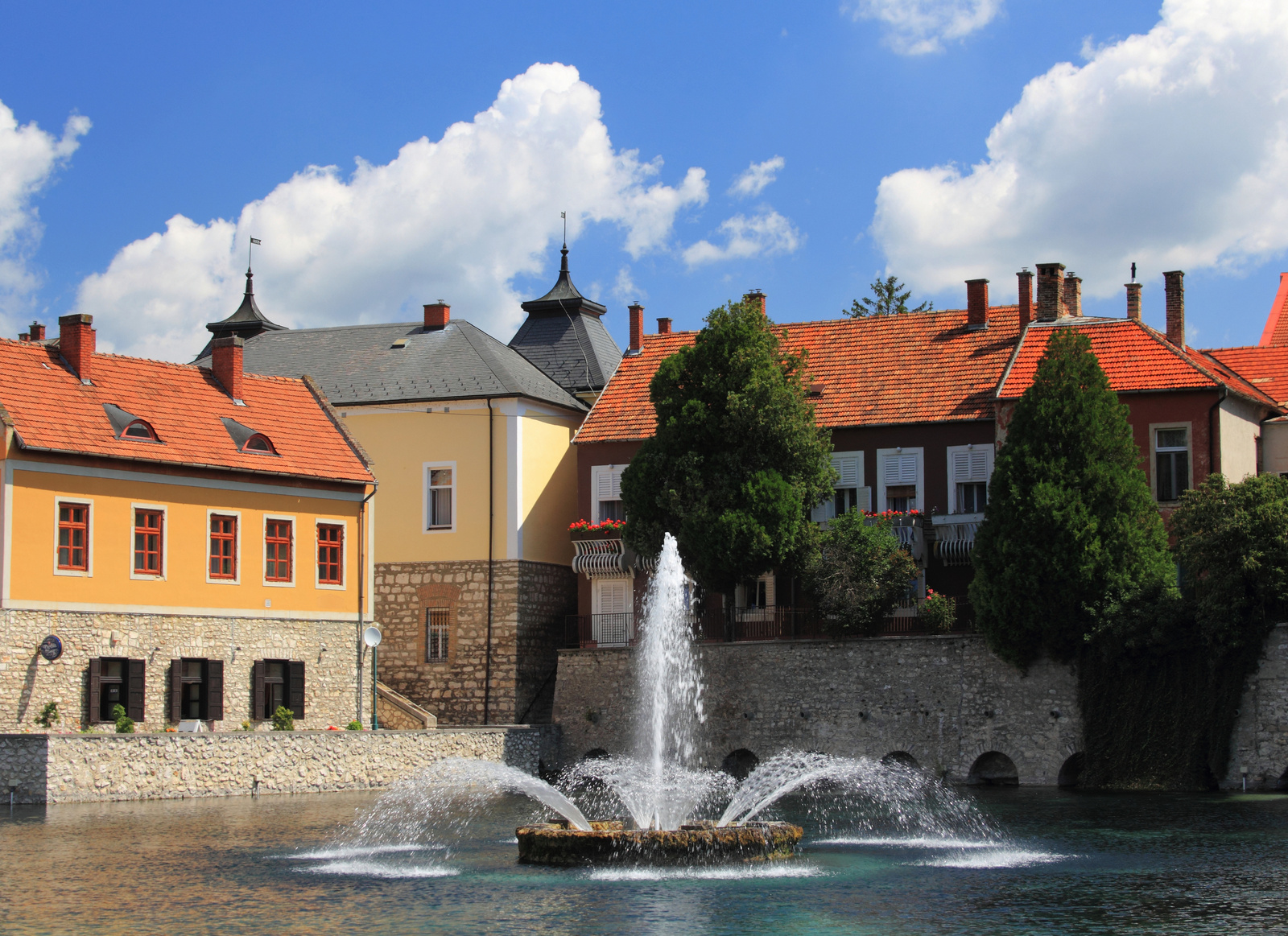
The Watermill of Tapolca

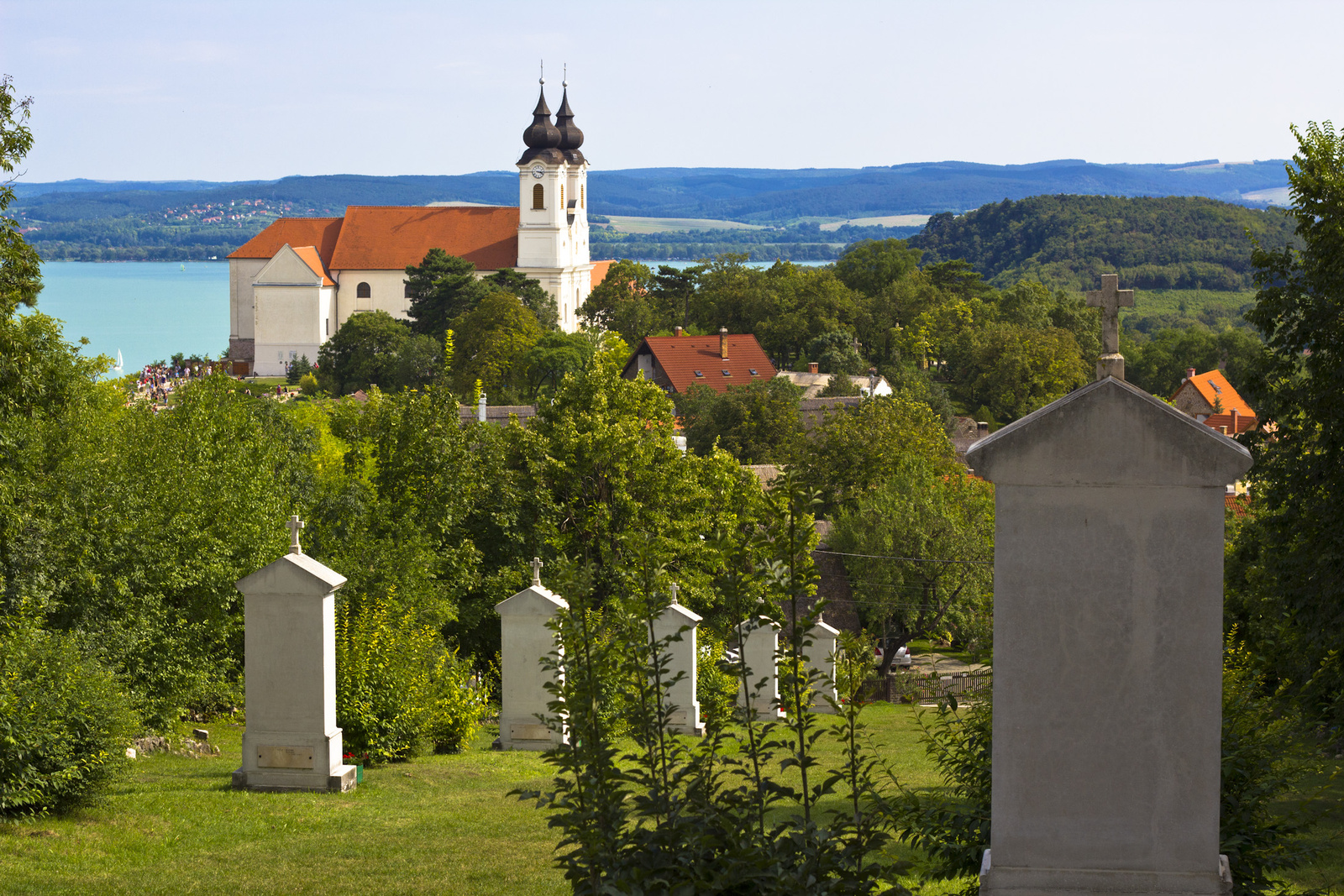
Tihany, behind Tihany Abbey and Lake Balaton

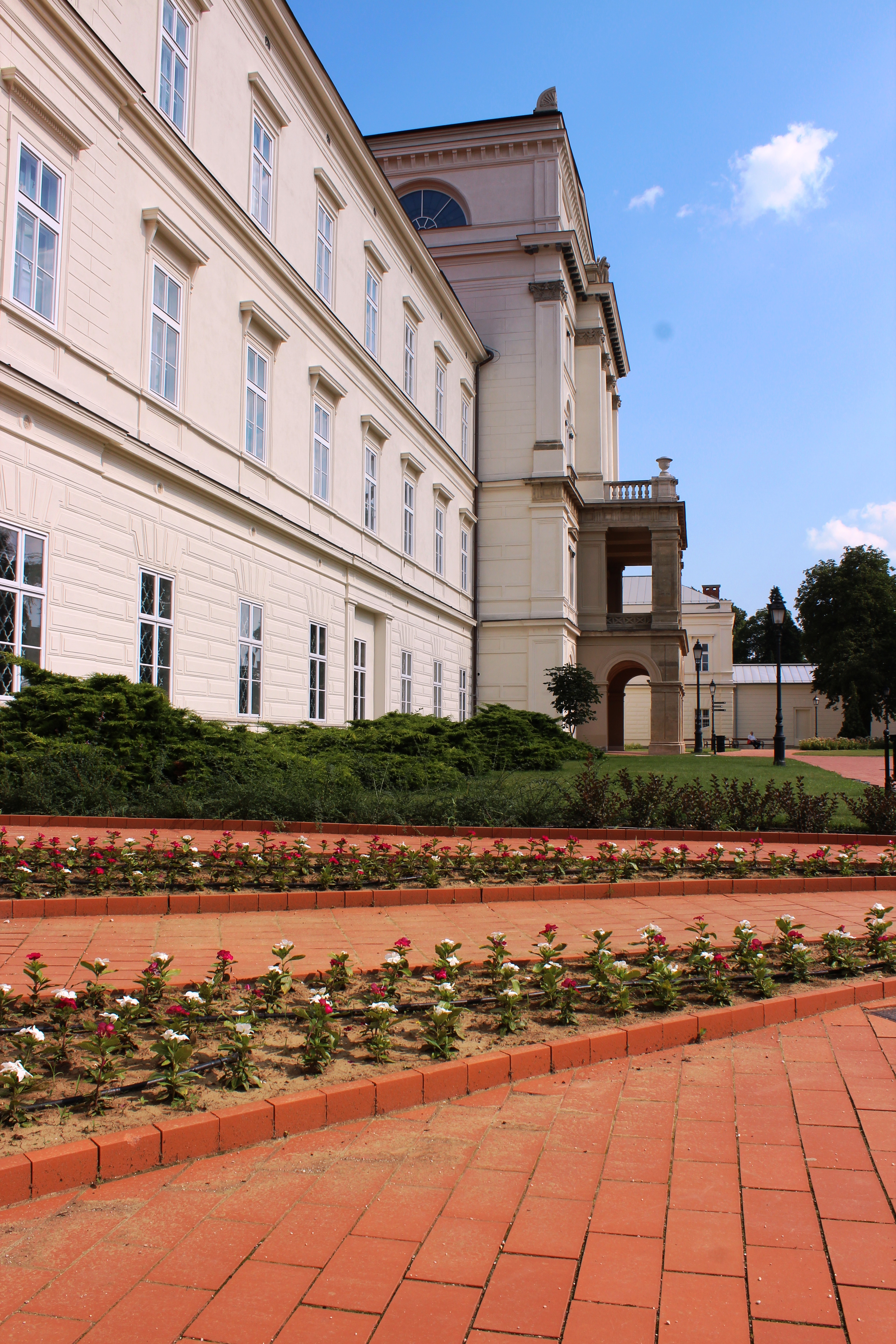
Cistercian Convent at Zirc

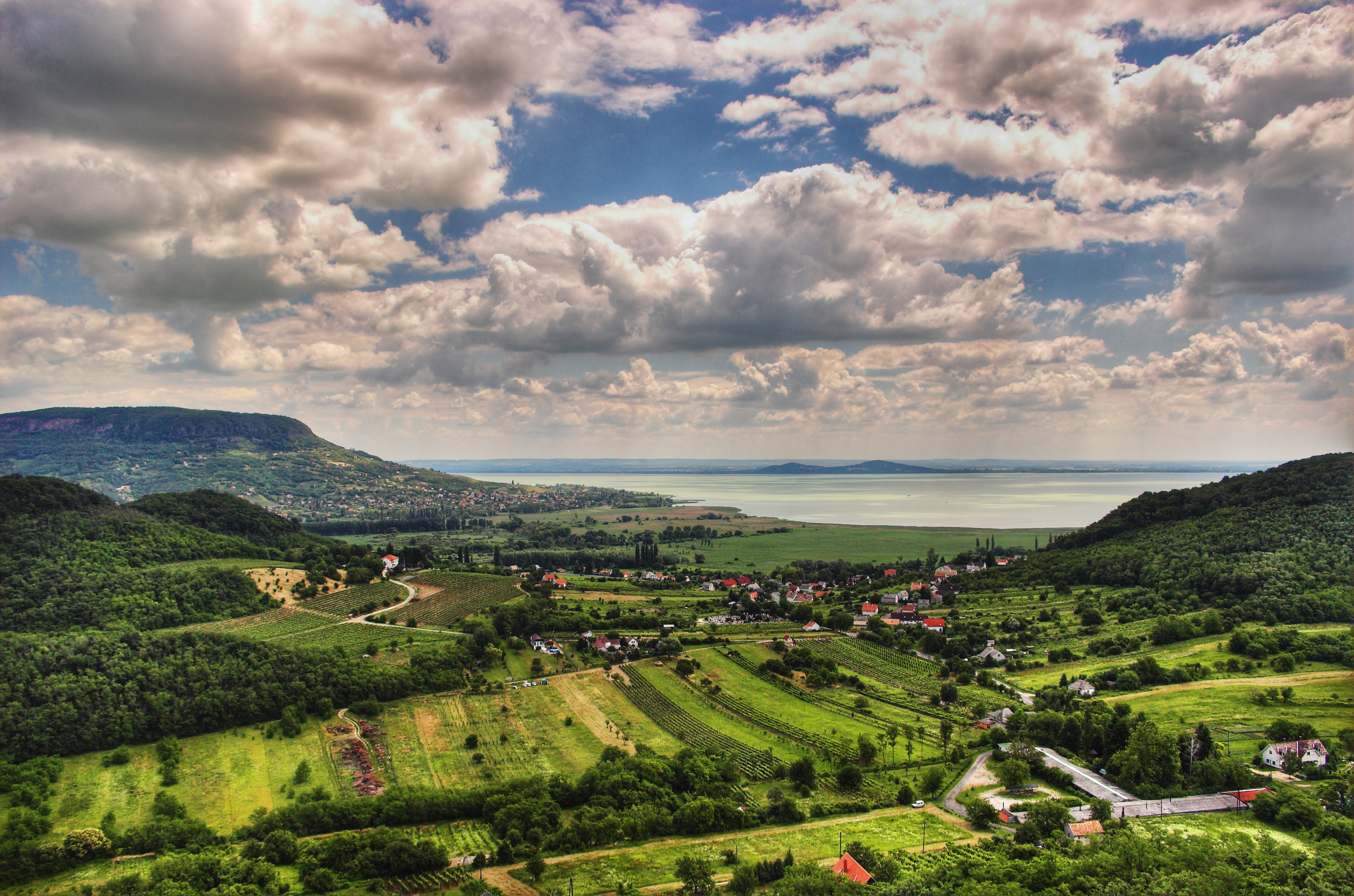
Badacsony

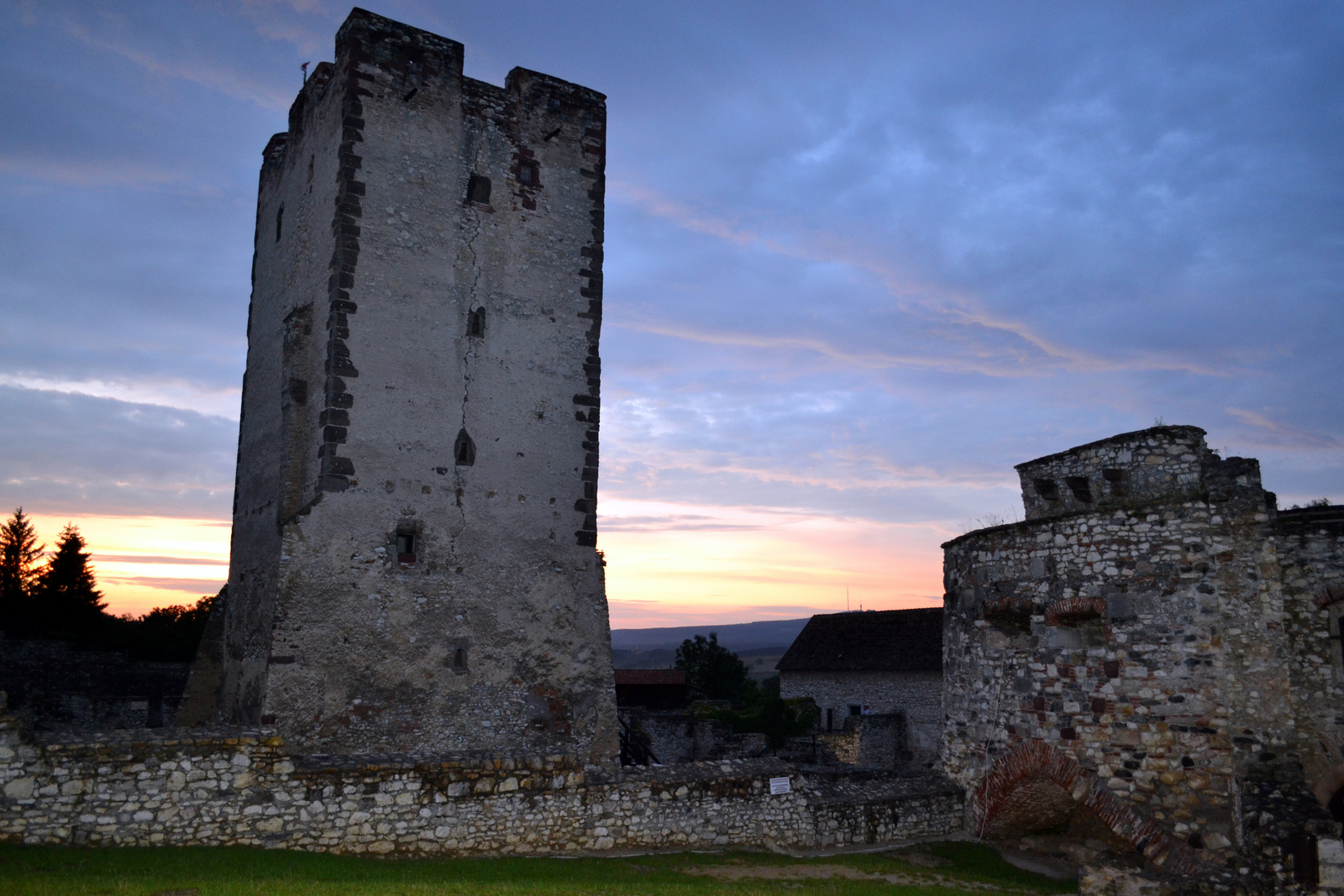
Castle of Vázsonykő, Nagyvázsony

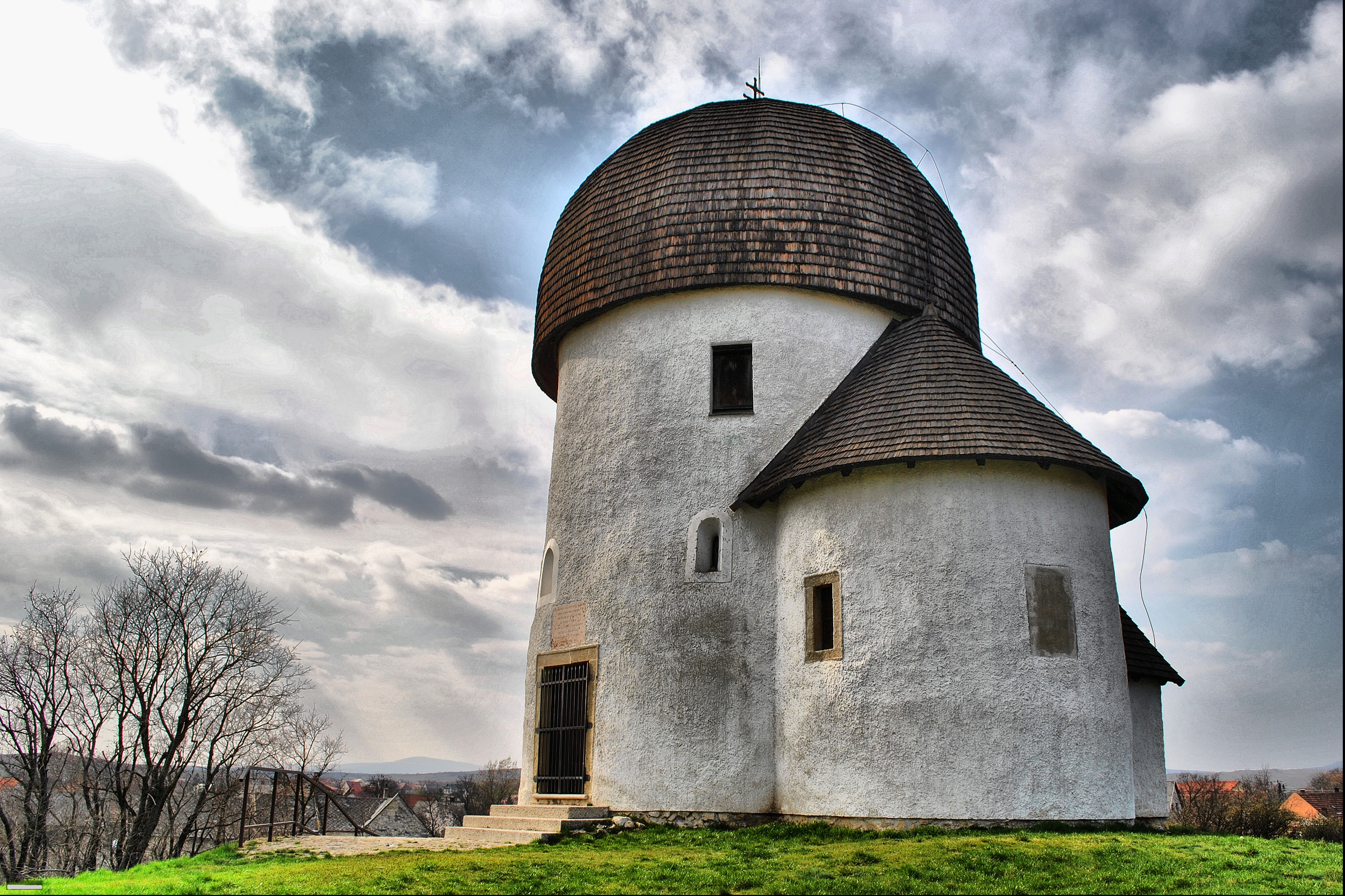
Round church of Öskü

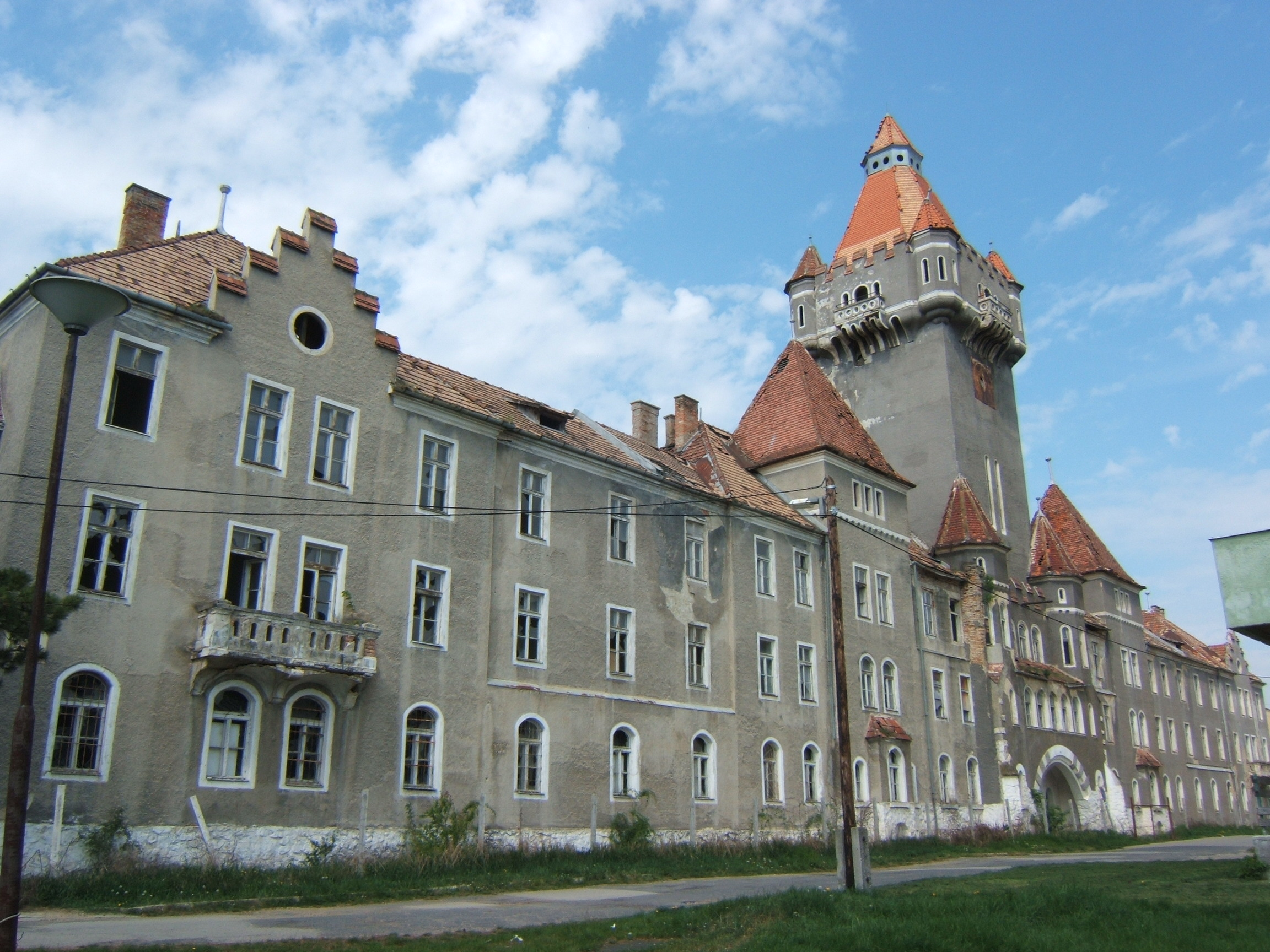
Former E1 headquarter building, Hajmáskér
