= Nagydém =

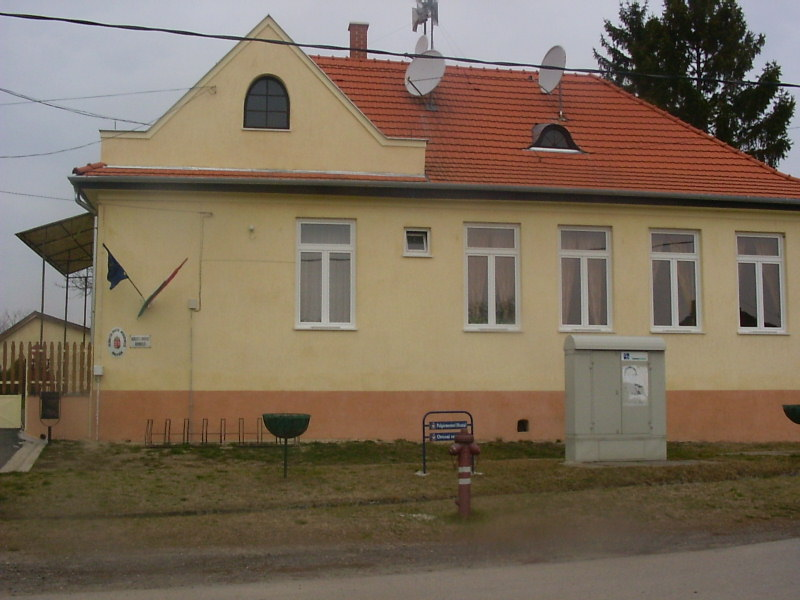
- Town hall

- Flag Coat of arms

- Location of Nagydém in Hungary
- Coordinates: 47.4395°N 17.675°E
- Country: Hungary
- Region: Central Transdanubia
- County: Veszprém

Area
  - Total: 13.32 km^{2} (5.14 sq mi)

Population (2012)
  - Total: 365
  - Density: 27.4/km^{2} (71.0/sq mi)
- Time zone: UTC+1 (CET)
  - Summer (DST): UTC+2 (CEST)
- Postal code: 8554
- Area code: +36 89
- Website: http://nagydem.hu/

Nagydém is a village in Veszprém county, Hungary. The village is believed to have ancient origins, due to archaeological discoveries dating to the Bronze Age and Iron Age.
