= Pusztamiske =

- Location of Veszprém county in Hungary

- Location of Pusztamiske
- Coordinates: 47.05995°N 17.44843°E
- Country: Hungary
- County: Veszprém

Area
  - Total: 17.82 km^{2} (6.88 sq mi)

Population (2004)
  - Total: 492
  - Density: 27.6/km^{2} (71/sq mi)
- Time zone: UTC+1 (CET)
  - Summer (DST): UTC+2 (CEST)
- Postal code: 8455
- Area code: 88

Pusztamiske is a village in Veszprém county, Hungary.
