= Devecser =

- Town
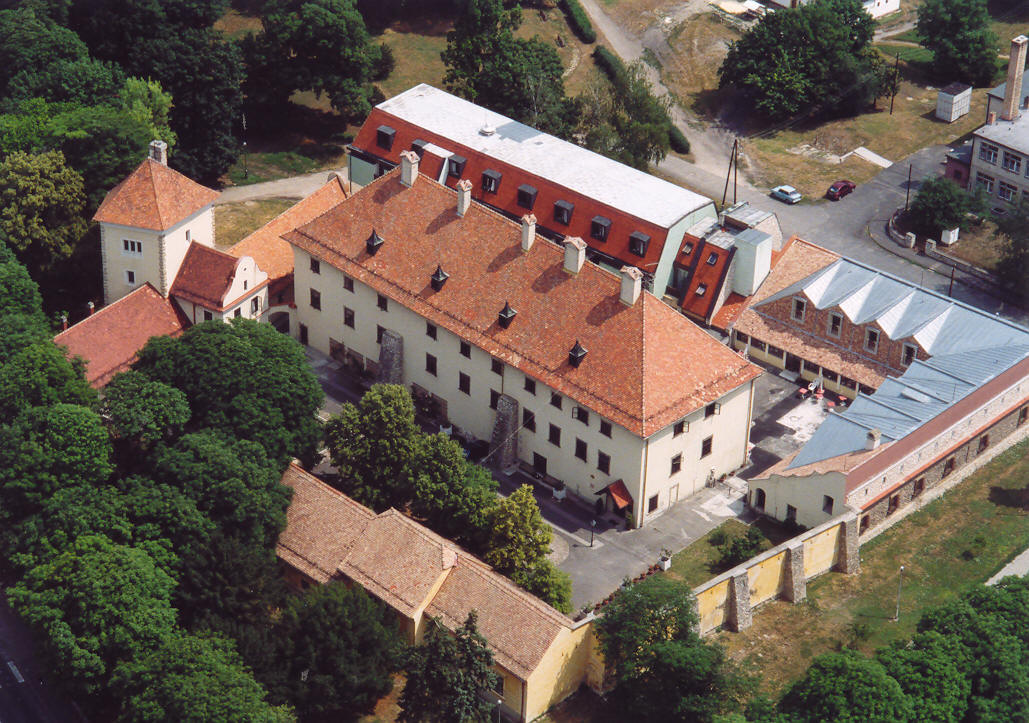
- Aerial photography: Devecser - Palace

- Flag Coat of arms

- Location of Devecser in Hungary
- Coordinates: 47.1061°N 17.4372°E
- Country: Hungary
- Region: Central Transdanubia
- County: Veszprém
- District: Devecser

Area
  - Total: 64.11 km^{2} (24.75 sq mi)

Population
  - Total: 4,330
  - Density: 67.5/km^{2} (175/sq mi)
  - Urban: 2,015
- Time zone: UTC+1 (CET)
  - Summer (DST): UTC+2 (CEST)
- Postal code: 8460
- Area code: +36 88
- Website: https://www.devecser.hu/

Devecser (Hungarian pronunciation: [ˈdɛvɛt͡ʃɛr]) is a town in Veszprém County, Hungary.

In the Middle Ages, there were five villages in the area of today's Devecser: Devecser, Kisdevecser, Szék, Meggyes, and Patony. These villages expanded in the 12th and 13th century. There is an Esterházy castle in the town.

== History ==
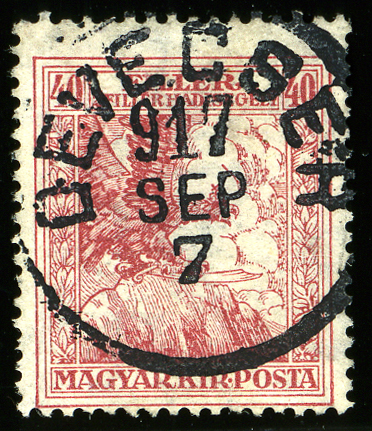
Devecser in the Kingdom in 1917 war times

Devecser was first mentioned as a family name in a document from July 22, 1274.

While the Ottomans occupied most of central Europe, the region north of lake Balaton remained in the Kingdom of Hungary (1538–1867) (captaincy between Balaton and Drava). Until 1918, Devecser was part of the Austrian monarchy, province of Hungary; in Transleithania after the compromise of 1867 in the Kingdom of Hungary.

During World War II, Devecser was captured by Soviet troops of the 3rd Ukrainian Front on 26 March 1945 in the course of the Vienna Offensive

In 1971 the district seat of the Devecser district was moved to Ajka, subsequently the Devecser district was renamed to the district of Ajka. In 2013 the Devecser district was reinstated.

== Industrial accident ==
In October 2010, a sludge reservoir at the Ajka aluminum plant burst its banks, killing at least four people and injuring more than 120. Part of the town had to be erased due to the soil contamination, leading to the removal of some houses.
