= Gecse =

- Flag Coat of arms

- Location of Gecse in Hungary
- Coordinates: 47.448°N 17.5295°E
- Country: Hungary
- Region: Central Transdanubia
- County: Veszprém

Area
  - Total: 9.34 km^{2} (3.61 sq mi)

Population (2012)
  - Total: 396
  - Density: 42.4/km^{2} (110/sq mi)
- Time zone: UTC+1 (CET)
  - Summer (DST): UTC+2 (CEST)
- Postal code: 8543
- Area code: +36 89
- Website: http://www.gecse.hu/

Gecse is a village in Veszprém county, Hungary.
