= Marcalgergelyi =

- Flag Coat of arms

- Location of Veszprém county in Hungary

- Location of Marcalgergelyi
- Coordinates: 47.3166667°N 17.2666667°E
- Country: Hungary
- County: Veszprém

Government
  - Mayor: Molnárné Nagy Melinda (Ind.)

Area
  - Total: 7.76 km^{2} (3.00 sq mi)

Population (2022)
  - Total: 350
  - Density: 45/km^{2} (120/sq mi)
- Time zone: UTC+1 (CET)
  - Summer (DST): UTC+2 (CEST)
- Postal code: 9534
- Area code: 89

Marcalgergelyi is a village in Veszprém county, Hungary.
