= Vinár =

- Location of Veszprém county in Hungary

- Location of Vinár
- Coordinates: 47.31123°N 17.28207°E
- Country: Hungary
- County: Veszprém

Area
  - Total: 4.6 km^{2} (1.8 sq mi)

Population (2004)
  - Total: 261
  - Density: 56.73/km^{2} (146.9/sq mi)
- Time zone: UTC+1 (CET)
  - Summer (DST): UTC+2 (CEST)
- Postal code: 9535
- Area code: 89

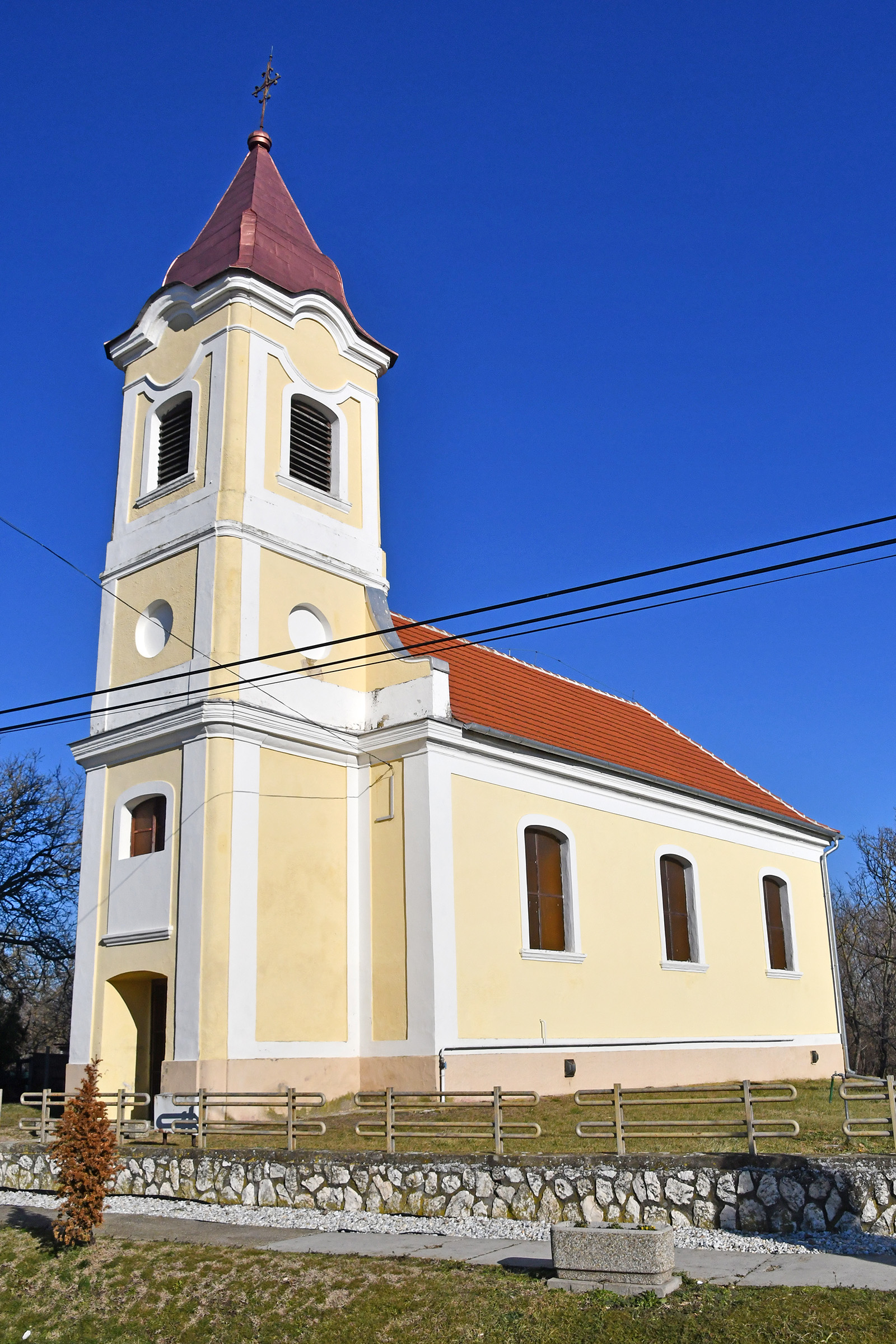
Roman Catholic church in Vinár, Hungary

Vinár is a village in Veszprém county, Hungary.
