= Nyárád =

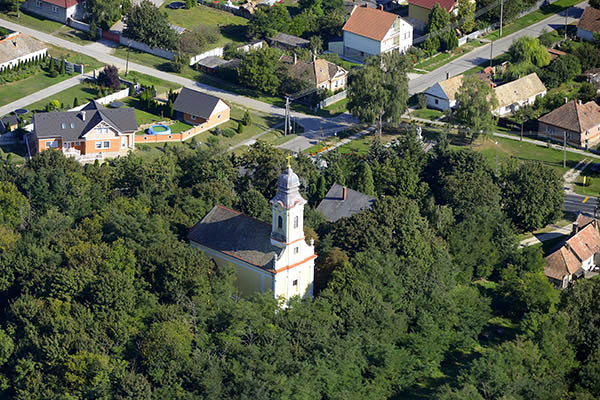
- Aerial view

- Flag Coat of arms

- Location of Nyárád
- Coordinates: 47.28448°N 17.36214°E
- Country: Hungary
- County: Veszprém

Area
  - Total: 19.83 km^{2} (7.66 sq mi)

Population (2004)
  - Total: 960
  - Density: 48.41/km^{2} (125.4/sq mi)
- Time zone: UTC+1 (CET)
  - Summer (DST): UTC+2 (CEST)
- Postal code: 8512
- Area code: 89

Nyárád is a village in Veszprém county, Hungary.
