= Adásztevel =

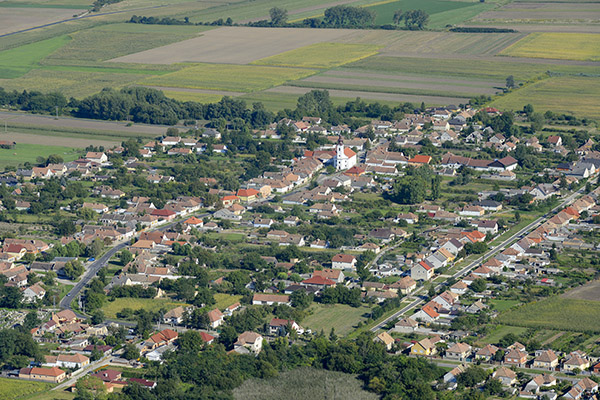
- Aerial view

- Coat of arms

- Location of Adásztevel in Hungary
- Coordinates: 47.3029°N 17.5368°E
- Country: Hungary
- Region: Central Transdanubia
- County: Veszprém

Area
  - Total: 8.37 km^{2} (3.23 sq mi)

Population (2012)
  - Total: 771
  - Density: 92.1/km^{2} (239/sq mi)
- Time zone: UTC+1 (CET)
  - Summer (DST): UTC+2 (CEST)
- Postal code: 8561
- Area code: +36 89
- Website: https://adasztevel.hu/

Adásztevel is a village in Veszprém county, Hungary.

Initially, the settlement was known singly by the latter part of its name, attested as Tuel in 1180. A 1373 record calls it Adastewyl. The origin of the prefix is obscure. It may come from the word ádáz, meaning 'ferocious'. The suffix is simply from the old personal name Tevel, which is possibly the combination of tesz ('do') and the diminutive suffix -l. A grandson of Árpád was called this.

At the end of the 19th century and the beginning of the 20th century, Jews lived in the village. In 1840, 149 Jews lived in the village and there was a Jewish cemetery there. Some of them were murdered in the Holocaust.

== Notable people ==
- László Komár, Hungarian singer
