= Nemesgörzsöny =

- Flag Coat of arms

- Location of Veszprém county in Hungary

- Location of Nemesgörzsöny
- Coordinates: 47.39457°N 17.36284°E
- Country: Hungary
- County: Veszprém

Area
  - Total: 19.25 km^{2} (7.43 sq mi)

Population (2004)
  - Total: 779
  - Density: 40.46/km^{2} (104.8/sq mi)
- Time zone: UTC+1 (CET)
  - Summer (DST): UTC+2 (CEST)
- Postal code: 8522
- Area code: 89

Nemesgörzsöny is a village in Veszprém county, Hungary.
