= Pápateszér =

- Flag Coat of arms

- Location of Veszprém county in Hungary

- Location of Pápateszér
- Coordinates: 47.38230°N 17.70191°E
- Country: Hungary
- County: Veszprém

Area
  - Total: 30.74 km^{2} (11.87 sq mi)

Population (2004)
  - Total: 1,255
  - Density: 40.82/km^{2} (105.7/sq mi)
- Time zone: UTC+1 (CET)
  - Summer (DST): UTC+2 (CEST)
- Postal code: 8556
- Area code: 89

Pápateszér is a village in Veszprém county, Hungary.

== Etymology ==
The name of the village referred to the profession of the villagers and comes from Slavic tesar - a carpenter. Thezar (1292)
