= Döbrönte =

Döbrönte Dewrenten
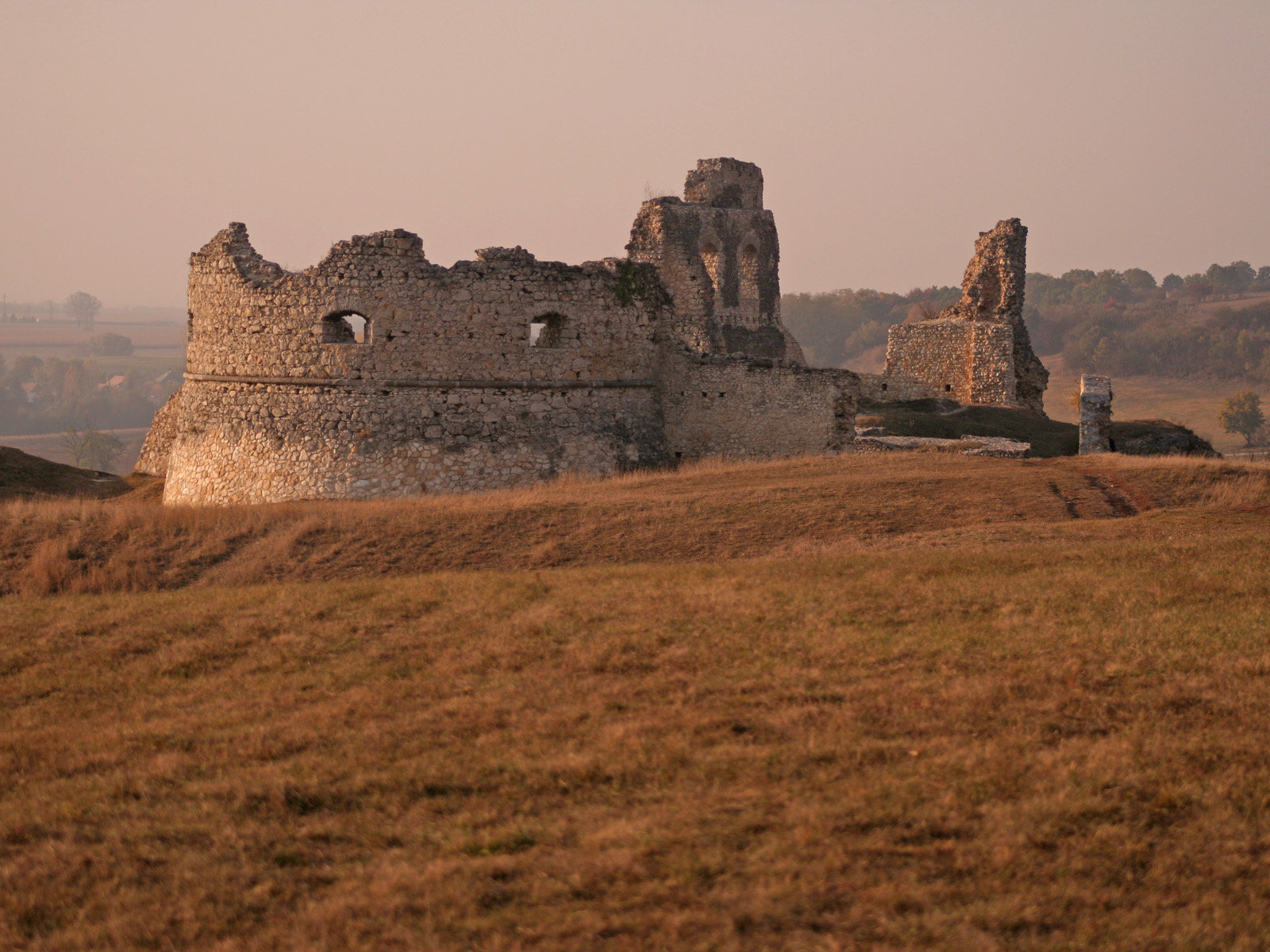

- Location of Veszprém county in Hungary

- Location of Döbrönte
- Coordinates: 47.22836°N 17.54693°E
- Country: Hungary
- County: Veszprém

Area
  - Total: 10.79 km^{2} (4.17 sq mi)

Population (2004)
  - Total: 260
  - Density: 24.09/km^{2} (62.4/sq mi)
- Time zone: UTC+1 (CET)
  - Summer (DST): UTC+2 (CEST)
- Postal code: 8597
- Area code: 89

Döbrönte (German: Dewrenten) is a village in Veszprém county, Hungary.

== Etymology ==
The name comes from Slavic personal name Dobręta. Debrenta, 1240.
