= Takácsi =

- Location of Veszprém county in Hungary

- Location of Takácsi
- Coordinates: 47.39749°N 17.47072°E
- Country: Hungary
- County: Veszprém

Area
  - Total: 19.13 km^{2} (7.39 sq mi)

Population (2004)
  - Total: 934
  - Density: 48.82/km^{2} (126.4/sq mi)
- Time zone: UTC+1 (CET)
  - Summer (DST): UTC+2 (CEST)
- Postal code: 8541
- Area code: 89

Takácsi is a village in Veszprém county, Hungary.
