= Mihályháza =

- Location of Veszprém county in Hungary

- Location of Mihályháza
- Coordinates: 47.30866°N 17.33607°E
- Country: Hungary
- County: Veszprém

Area
  - Total: 21.52 km^{2} (8.31 sq mi)

Population (2004)
  - Total: 834
  - Density: 38.75/km^{2} (100.4/sq mi)
- Time zone: UTC+1 (CET)
  - Summer (DST): UTC+2 (CEST)
- Postal code: 8513
- Area code: 89

Mihályháza is a village in Veszprém county, Hungary.
