= Külsővat =

- Flag Coat of arms

- Location of Veszprém county in Hungary

- Location of Külsővat
- Coordinates: 47.29652°N 17.22656°E
- Country: Hungary
- County: Veszprém

Area
  - Total: 19.31 km^{2} (7.46 sq mi)

Population (2004)
  - Total: 867
  - Density: 44.89/km^{2} (116.3/sq mi)
- Time zone: UTC+1 (CET)
  - Summer (DST): UTC+2 (CEST)
- Postal code: 9532
- Area code: 89

Külsővat is a village in Veszprém county, Hungary.
