= Kup, Hungary =

Kup
- Flag Coat of arms

- Location of Veszprém county in Hungary

- Location of Kup, Hungary
- Coordinates: 47.24717°N 17.46404°E
- Country: Hungary
- County: Veszprém

Area
  - Total: 24.78 km^{2} (9.57 sq mi)

Population (2004)
  - Total: 451
  - Density: 18.2/km^{2} (47/sq mi)
- Time zone: UTC+1 (CET)
  - Summer (DST): UTC+2 (CEST)
- Postal code: 8595
- Area code: 89

Kup is a village in Veszprém county, Hungary.
