= Csót =

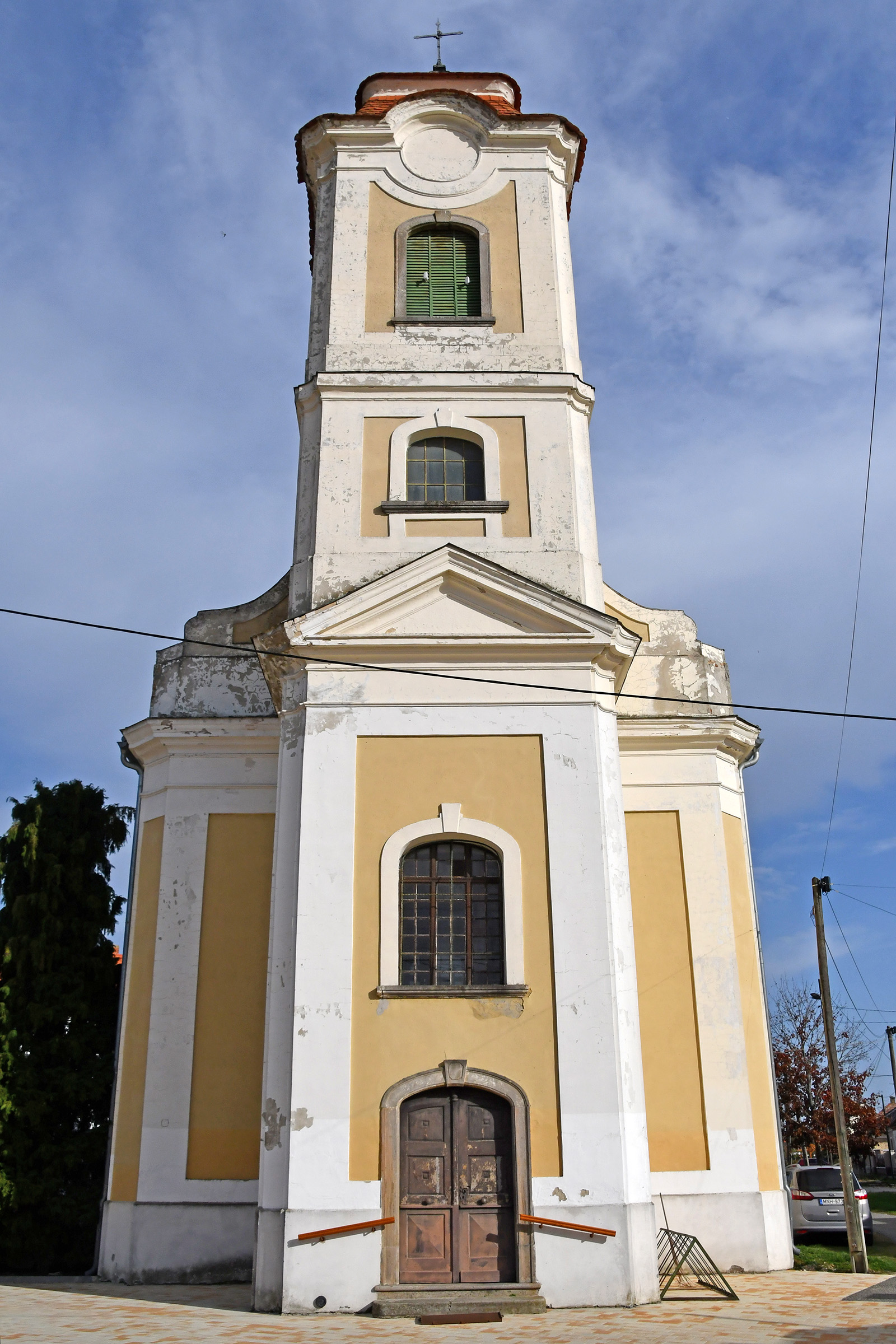

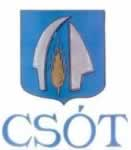
- Coat of arms

- Location of Veszprém county in Hungary

- Location of Csót
- Coordinates: 47.36202°N 17.60526°E
- Country: Hungary
- County: Veszprém

Area
  - Total: 20.02 km^{2} (7.73 sq mi)

Population (2004)
  - Total: 1,149
  - Density: 57.39/km^{2} (148.6/sq mi)
- Time zone: UTC+1 (CET)
  - Summer (DST): UTC+2 (CEST)
- Postal code: 8558
- Area code: 89

Csót is a village in Veszprém county, Hungary.
