= Pápakovácsi =

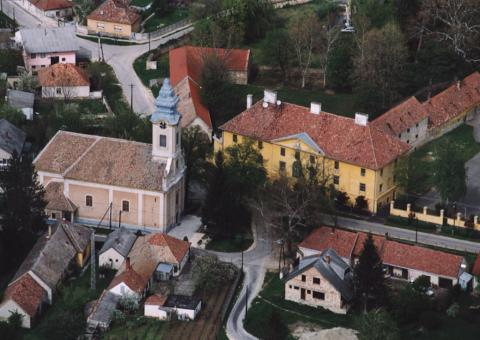
- Aerial view of Pápakovácsi

- Flag Coat of arms

- Location of Veszprém county in Hungary

- Location of Pápakovácsi
- Coordinates: 47.26403°N 17.48593°E
- Country: Hungary
- County: Veszprém

Area
  - Total: 13.92 km^{2} (5.37 sq mi)

Population (2025)
  - Total: 534
  - Density: 42.31/km^{2} (109.6/sq mi)
- Time zone: UTC+1 (CET)
  - Summer (DST): UTC+2 (CEST)
- Postal code: 8596
- Area code: 89

Pápakovácsi is a village in Veszprém county, Hungary.
