= Nagyacsád =

- Location of Veszprém county in Hungary

- Location of Nagyacsád
- Coordinates: 47.36586°N 17.37340°E
- Country: Hungary
- County: Veszprém

Area
  - Total: 13.96 km^{2} (5.39 sq mi)

Population (2004)
  - Total: 716
  - Density: 51.28/km^{2} (132.8/sq mi)
- Time zone: UTC+1 (CET)
  - Summer (DST): UTC+2 (CEST)
- Postal code: 8521
- Area code: 89

Nagyacsád is a village in Veszprém county, Hungary.
