= Homokbödöge =

- Location of Veszprém county in Hungary

- Location of Homokbödöge
- Coordinates: 47°18′07″N 17°35′21″E
- Country: Hungary
- County: Veszprém

Area
  - Total: 16.15 km^{2} (6.24 sq mi)

Population (2004)
  - Total: 698
  - Density: 43.21/km^{2} (111.9/sq mi)
- Time zone: UTC+1 (CET)
  - Summer (DST): UTC+2 (CEST)
- Postal code: 8563
- Area code: 89

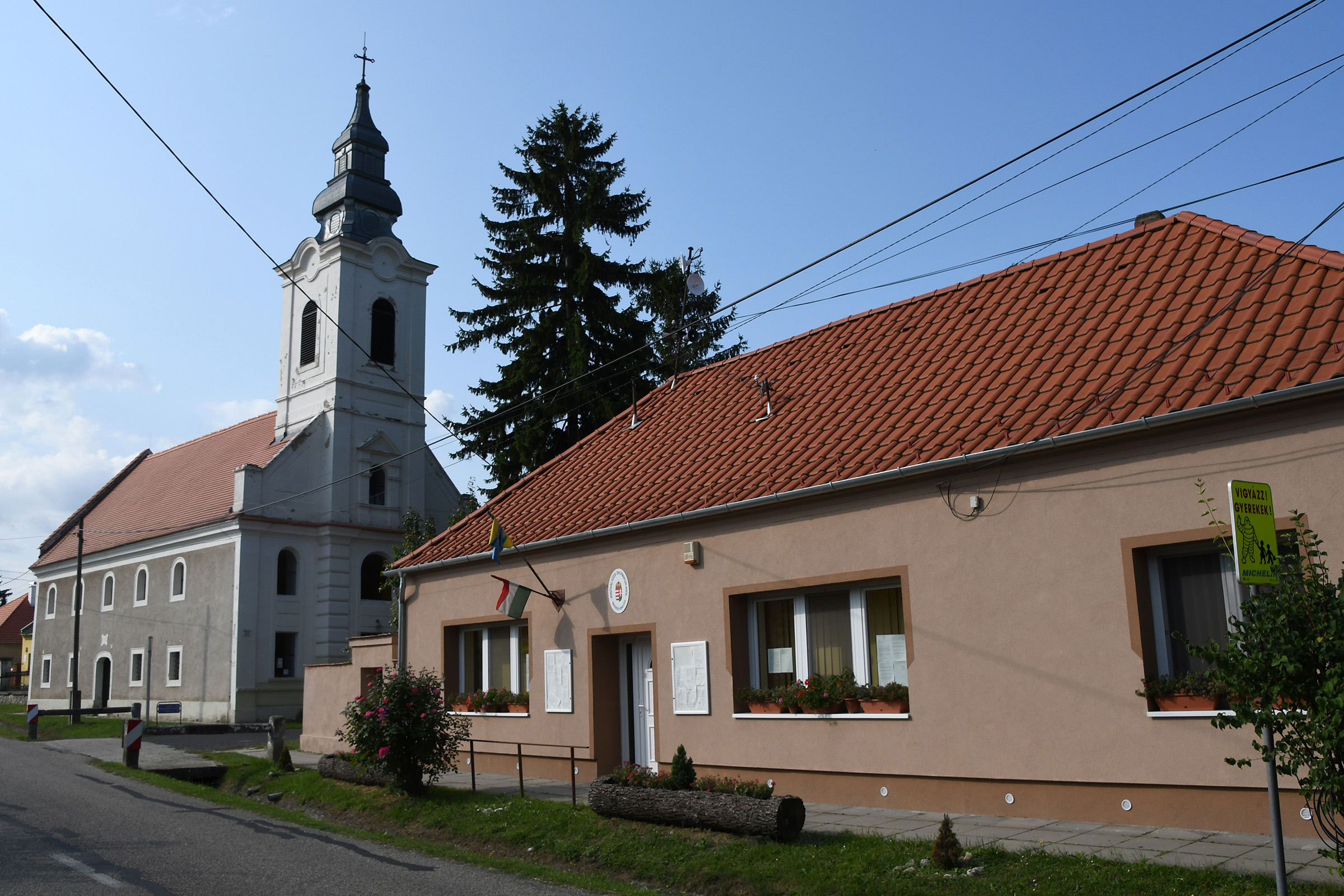
Homokbödöge Village Hall with Lutheran church at left

Homokbödöge is a village in Veszprém county, Hungary.
