= Nagyesztergár =

- Flag Coat of arms

- Location of Veszprém county in Hungary

- Location of Nagyesztergár
- Coordinates: 47°16′36″N 17°54′18″E
- Country: Hungary
- County: Veszprém

Area
  - Total: 18.29 km^{2} (7.06 sq mi)

Population (2004)
  - Total: 1,105
  - Density: 68.61/km^{2} (177.7/sq mi)
- Time zone: UTC+1 (CET)
  - Summer (DST): UTC+2 (CEST)
- Postal code: 8415
- Area code: 88

Nagyesztergár is a village in Zirc District, Veszprém county, Hungary.
