= Lovászpatona =

- Flag Coat of arms

- Location of Veszprém county in Hungary

- Location of Lovászpatona
- Coordinates: 47.43245°N 17.62603°E
- Country: Hungary
- County: Veszprém

Area
  - Total: 49.9 km^{2} (19.3 sq mi)

Population (2004)
  - Total: 1,318
  - Density: 26.41/km^{2} (68.4/sq mi)
- Time zone: UTC+1 (CET)
  - Summer (DST): UTC+2 (CEST)
- Postal code: 8553
- Area code: 89

Lovászpatona is a village in Veszprém county, Hungary.

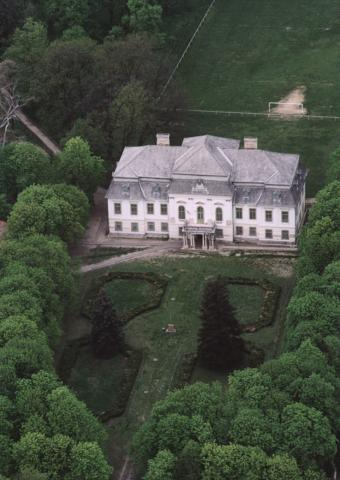
Aerial photography of Lovászpatona palace
