= Kisberzseny =

- Location of Veszprém county in Hungary

- Location of Kisberzseny
- Coordinates: 47.10682°N 17.26657°E
- Country: Hungary
- County: Veszprém

Government
  - Mayor: Ferenczy Lajos Szilárd (Ind.)

Area
  - Total: 5.29 km^{2} (2.04 sq mi)

Population (2022)
  - Total: 96
  - Density: 18/km^{2} (47/sq mi)
- Time zone: UTC+1 (CET)
  - Summer (DST): UTC+2 (CEST)
- Postal code: 8477
- Area code: 88

Kisberzseny is a village in Veszprém county, Hungary.
