= Kiscsősz =

- Location of Veszprém county in Hungary

- Location of Kiscsősz
- Coordinates: 47.19684°N 17.27970°E
- Country: Hungary
- County: Veszprém

Area
  - Total: 9.04 km^{2} (3.49 sq mi)

Population (2004)
  - Total: 123
  - Density: 13.6/km^{2} (35/sq mi)
- Time zone: UTC+1 (CET)
  - Summer (DST): UTC+2 (CEST)
- Postal code: 8494
- Area code: 88

Kiscsősz is a village in Veszprém county, Hungary.
