= Nagypirit =

- Location of Veszprém county in Hungary

- Location of Nagypirit
- Coordinates: 47.19844°N 17.22508°E
- Country: Hungary
- County: Veszprém

Government
  - Mayor: Burján Ernő (Fidesz-KDNP)

Area
  - Total: 10.17 km^{2} (3.93 sq mi)

Population (2022)
  - Total: 241
  - Density: 23.7/km^{2} (61.4/sq mi)
- Time zone: UTC+1 (CET)
  - Summer (DST): UTC+2 (CEST)
- Postal code: 8496
- Area code: 88
- Website: nagypirit.hu

Nagypirit is a village in Veszprém county, Hungary.
