= Kamond =

- Flag Coat of arms

- Location of Veszprém county in Hungary

- Location of Kamond
- Coordinates: 47.147°N 17.204°E
- Country: Hungary
- County: Veszprém

Area
  - Total: 20.5 km^{2} (7.9 sq mi)

Population (2004)
  - Total: 450
  - Density: 21.95/km^{2} (56.9/sq mi)
- Time zone: UTC+1 (CET)
  - Summer (DST): UTC+2 (CEST)
- Postal code: 8469
- Area code: 88

Kamond is a village in Veszprém county, Hungary.
