= Karakószörcsök =

- Flag Coat of arms

- Location of Veszprém county in Hungary

- Location of Karakószörcsök
- Coordinates: 47.13295°N 17.28497°E
- Country: Hungary
- County: Veszprém

Area
  - Total: 7.11 km^{2} (2.75 sq mi)

Population (2004)
  - Total: 326
  - Density: 45.85/km^{2} (118.8/sq mi)
- Time zone: UTC+1 (CET)
  - Summer (DST): UTC+2 (CEST)
- Postal code: 8491
- Area code: 88

Karakószörcsök is a village in Veszprém county, Hungary.
