= Somlóvecse =

- Location of Veszprém county in Hungary

- Location of Somlóvecse
- Coordinates: 47.19470°N 17.35198°E
- Country: Hungary
- County: Veszprém

Area
  - Total: 4.93 km^{2} (1.90 sq mi)

Population (2004)
  - Total: 95
  - Density: 19.26/km^{2} (49.9/sq mi)
- Time zone: UTC+1 (CET)
  - Summer (DST): UTC+2 (CEST)
- Postal code: 8484
- Area code: 88

Somlóvecse is a village in Veszprém county, Hungary.
