= Somlóvásárhely =

- Flag Coat of arms

- Location of Veszprém county in Hungary

- Location of Somlóvásárhely
- Coordinates: 47.12042°N 17.37592°E
- Country: Hungary
- County: Veszprém

Area
  - Total: 23.21 km^{2} (8.96 sq mi)

Population (2004)
  - Total: 1,112
  - Density: 47.91/km^{2} (124.1/sq mi)
- Time zone: UTC+1 (CET)
  - Summer (DST): UTC+2 (CEST)
- Postal code: 8481
- Area code: 88

Somlóvásárhely is a village in Veszprém county, Hungary.
