= Csögle =

- Flag Coat of arms

- Location of Veszprém county in Hungary

- Location of Csögle
- Coordinates: 47.21733°N 17.25763°E
- Country: Hungary
- County: Veszprém

Area
  - Total: 16.91 km^{2} (6.53 sq mi)

Population (2004)
  - Total: 726
  - Density: 42.93/km^{2} (111.2/sq mi)
- Time zone: UTC+1 (CET)
  - Summer (DST): UTC+2 (CEST)
- Postal code: 8495
- Area code: 88
- Website: www.csogle.hu

Csögle is a village in Veszprém county, Hungary.
