= Borszörcsök =

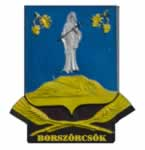
- Coat of arms

- Location of Veszprém county in Hungary

- Location of Borszörcsök
- Coordinates: 47.13305°N 17.40512°E
- Country: Hungary
- County: Veszprém

Area
  - Total: 11.8 km^{2} (4.6 sq mi)

Population (2004)
  - Total: 391
  - Density: 33.13/km^{2} (85.8/sq mi)
- Time zone: UTC+1 (CET)
  - Summer (DST): UTC+2 (CEST)
- Postal code: 8479
- Area code: 88

Borszörcsök is a village in Veszprém county, Hungary.
