= Adorjánháza =

- Coat of arms

- Location of Adorjánháza in Hungary
- Coordinates: 47.2402°N 17.2419°E
- Country: Hungary
- Region: Central Transdanubia
- County: Veszprém

Area
  - Total: 11.42 km^{2} (4.41 sq mi)

Population (2012)
  - Total: 338
  - Density: 29.6/km^{2} (76.7/sq mi)
- Time zone: UTC+1 (CET)
  - Summer (DST): UTC+2 (CEST)
- Postal code: 8497
- Area code: +36 88
- Website: http://adorjanhaza.hu/

Adorjánháza is a village in Veszprém county, Hungary.

The name literally means 'house of Adorján' and refers to the backyard of a landlord named Adrián. It was recorded as Adryanhaza in 1476, but over time, the first part evolved into Adorján, which is another form of the same name.
