= Dabrony =

- Location of Veszprém county in Hungary

- Location of Dabrony
- Coordinates: 47.24360°N 17.33064°E
- Country: Hungary
- County: Veszprém

Area
  - Total: 17 km^{2} (6.6 sq mi)

Population (2004)
  - Total: 399
  - Density: 23.47/km^{2} (60.8/sq mi)
- Time zone: UTC+1 (CET)
  - Summer (DST): UTC+2 (CEST)
- Postal code: 8485
- Area code: 88

Dabrony is a village in Veszprém county, Hungary.
