= Kerta =

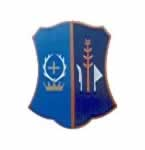
- Coat of arms

- Location of Veszprém county in Hungary

- Location of Kerta
- Coordinates: 47.163°N 17.273°E
- Country: Hungary
- County: Veszprém

Area
  - Total: 15.46 km^{2} (5.97 sq mi)

Population (2004)
  - Total: 713
  - Density: 46.11/km^{2} (119.4/sq mi)
- Time zone: UTC+1 (CET)
  - Summer (DST): UTC+2 (CEST)
- Postal code: 8492
- Area code: 88

Kerta is a village in Veszprém county, Hungary.
