= Somlószőlős =

- Location of Veszprém county in Hungary

- Location of Somlószőlős
- Coordinates: 47.17033°N 17.35735°E
- Country: Hungary
- County: Veszprém

Area
  - Total: 19.46 km^{2} (7.51 sq mi)

Population (2004)
  - Total: 699
  - Density: 35.91/km^{2} (93.0/sq mi)
- Time zone: UTC+1 (CET)
  - Summer (DST): UTC+2 (CEST)
- Postal code: 8483
- Area code: 88

Somlószőlős is a village in Veszprém county, Hungary.
