= Vid, Hungary =

Vid
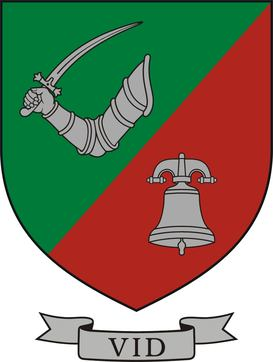
- Coat of arms

- Location of Veszprém county in Hungary

- Location of Vid, Hungary
- Coordinates: 47.21356°N 17.33651°E
- Country: Hungary
- County: Veszprém

Area
  - Total: 3.17 km^{2} (1.22 sq mi)

Population (2004)
  - Total: 114
  - Density: 35.96/km^{2} (93.1/sq mi)
- Time zone: UTC+1 (CET)
  - Summer (DST): UTC+2 (CEST)
- Postal code: 8484
- Area code: 88

Vid is a village in Veszprém county, Hungary.
