= Kispirit =

- Location of Veszprém county in Hungary

- Location of Kispirit
- Coordinates: 47.19865°N 17.24113°E
- Country: Hungary
- County: Veszprém

Area
  - Total: 4.96 km^{2} (1.92 sq mi)

Population (2004)
  - Total: 96
  - Density: 19.35/km^{2} (50.1/sq mi)
- Time zone: UTC+1 (CET)
  - Summer (DST): UTC+2 (CEST)
- Postal code: 8496
- Area code: 88

Kispirit is a village in Veszprém county, Hungary.

== History ==
The settlement was first mentioned in 1532, The bell tower dates from 1737. In 1739 the church tower was built. Folklore suggests that Kispirit Inn was frequented by the last famous outlaw of the region, Joska Acid.
