= Apácatorna =

- Flag Coat of arms

- Location of Veszprém county in Hungary

- Location of Apácatorna
- Coordinates: 47.11287°N 17.29440°E
- Country: Hungary
- County: Veszprém

Area
  - Total: 7.29 km^{2} (2.81 sq mi)

Population (2004)
  - Total: 183
  - Density: 25.1/km^{2} (65/sq mi)
- Time zone: UTC+1 (CET)
  - Summer (DST): UTC+2 (CEST)
- Postal code: 8477
- Area code: 88

Apácatorna is a village in Veszprém county, Hungary.
