= Noszlop =

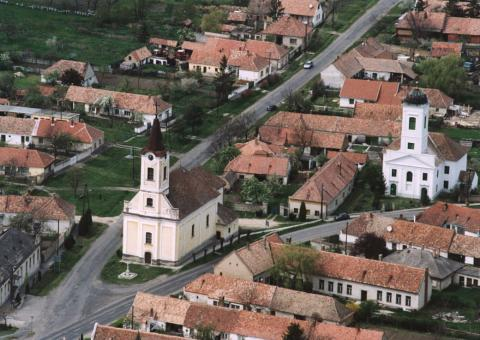

- Flag Coat of arms

- Location of Veszprém county in Hungary

- Location of Noszlop
- Coordinates: 47.17594°N 17.45740°E
- Country: Hungary
- County: Veszprém

Area
  - Total: 34.06 km^{2} (13.15 sq mi)

Population (2004)
  - Total: 1,082
  - Density: 31.76/km^{2} (82.3/sq mi)
- Time zone: UTC+1 (CET)
  - Summer (DST): UTC+2 (CEST)
- Postal code: 8456
- Area code: 88

Noszlop is a village in Veszprém county, Hungary. Original names are Nuztupe, Nuztup, Noslop.
