= Doba, Hungary =

Doba
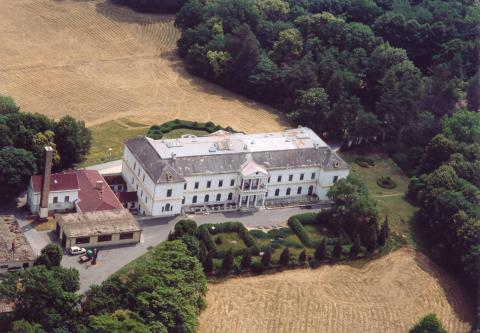
- The Erdődy mansion from above

- Flag Coat of arms

- Location of Doba in Hungary
- Coordinates: 47.1654°N 17.3823°E
- Country: Hungary
- Region: Central Transdanubia
- County: Veszprém

Area
  - Total: 21.22 km^{2} (8.19 sq mi)

Population (2012)
  - Total: 512
  - Density: 24.1/km^{2} (62.5/sq mi)
- Time zone: UTC+1 (CET)
  - Summer (DST): UTC+2 (CEST)
- Postal code: 8482
- Area code: +36 88
- Website: http://doba.hu/

Doba is a village in Veszprém county, Hungary.
