= Somlójenő =

- Flag Coat of arms

- Location of Veszprém county in Hungary

- Location of Somlójenő
- Coordinates: 47.12512°N 17.35380°E
- Country: Hungary
- County: Veszprém

Area
  - Total: 8.15 km^{2} (3.15 sq mi)

Population (2004)
  - Total: 332
  - Density: 40.73/km^{2} (105.5/sq mi)
- Time zone: UTC+1 (CET)
  - Summer (DST): UTC+2 (CEST)
- Postal code: 8478
- Area code: 88

Somlójenő is a village in Veszprém county, Hungary.
