= Egeralja =

- Flag Coat of arms

- Location of Egeralja in Hungary
- Coordinates: 47.2369°N 17.24°E
- Country: Hungary
- Region: Central Transdanubia
- County: Veszprém

Area
  - Total: 8.94 km^{2} (3.45 sq mi)

Population (2012)
  - Total: 234
  - Density: 26.2/km^{2} (67.8/sq mi)
- Time zone: UTC+1 (CET)
  - Summer (DST): UTC+2 (CEST)
- Postal code: 8497
- Area code: +36 88
- Website: http://egeralja.hu/

Egeralja is a village in Veszprém county, Hungary.
