= Oroszi =

- Flag Coat of arms

- Location of Veszprém county in Hungary

- Location of Oroszi
- Coordinates: 47.15600°N 17.41659°E
- Country: Hungary
- County: Veszprém

Area
  - Total: 4.74 km^{2} (1.83 sq mi)

Population (2004)
  - Total: 133
  - Density: 28.05/km^{2} (72.6/sq mi)
- Time zone: UTC+1 (CET)
  - Summer (DST): UTC+2 (CEST)
- Postal code: 8458
- Area code: 88

Oroszi is a village in Veszprém county, Hungary.
