= Nagyalásony =

- Location of Veszprém county in Hungary

- Location of Nagyalásony
- Coordinates: 47.23158°N 17.35575°E
- Country: Hungary
- County: Veszprém

Area
  - Total: 14.01 km^{2} (5.41 sq mi)

Population (2004)
  - Total: 525
  - Density: 37.47/km^{2} (97.0/sq mi)
- Time zone: UTC+1 (CET)
  - Summer (DST): UTC+2 (CEST)
- Postal code: 8484
- Area code: 88

Nagyalásony is a village in Veszprém county, Hungary.
