= Kisszőlős =

- Location of Veszprém county in Hungary

- Location of Kisszőlős
- Coordinates: 47.19750°N 17.33066°E
- Country: Hungary
- County: Veszprém

Area
  - Total: 6.49 km^{2} (2.51 sq mi)

Population (2004)
  - Total: 136
  - Density: 20.95/km^{2} (54.3/sq mi)
- Time zone: UTC+1 (CET)
  - Summer (DST): UTC+2 (CEST)
- Postal code: 8483
- Area code: 88

Kisszőlős is a village in Veszprém county, Hungary.
