= Tüskevár =

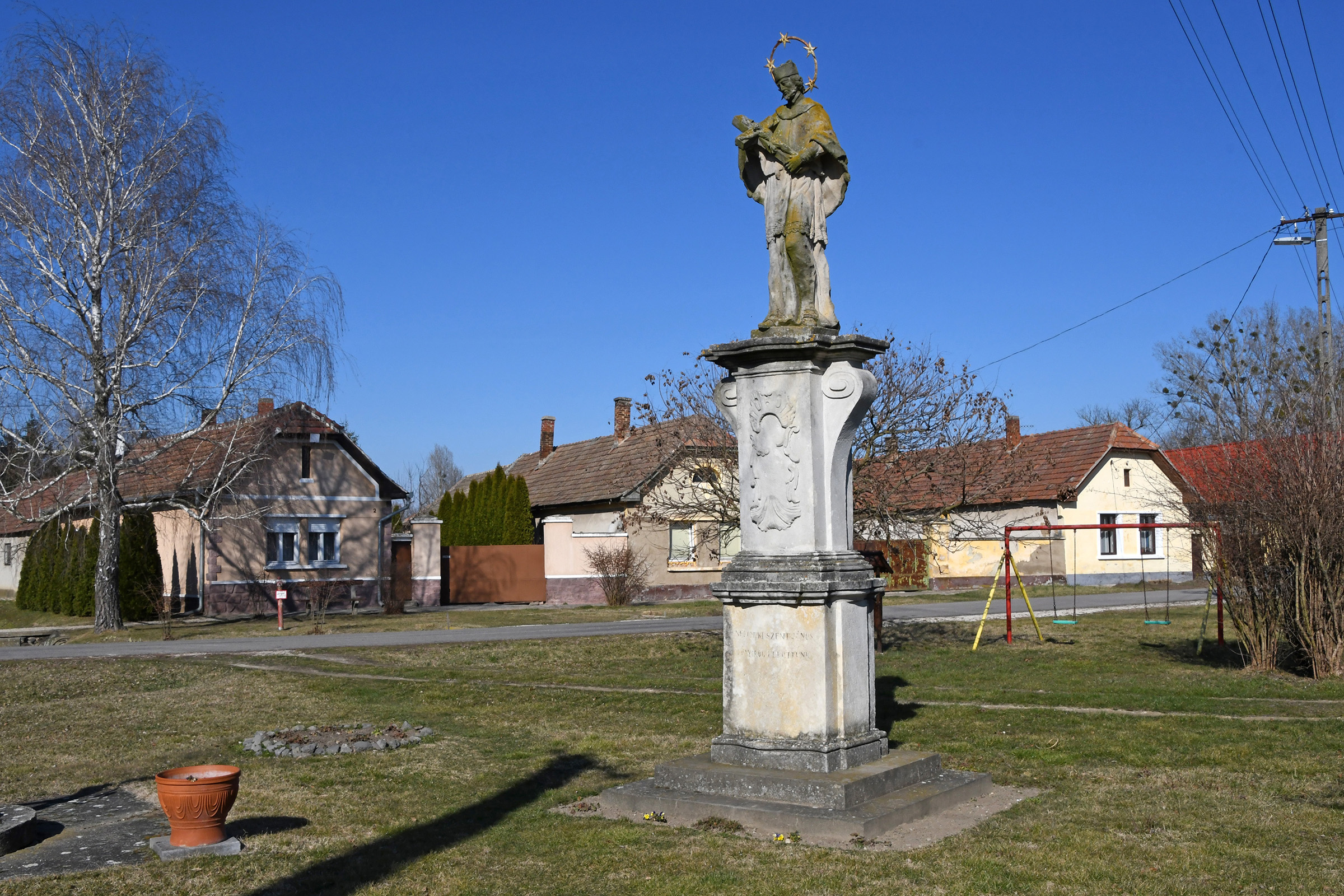
- Statue of Saint John of Nepomuk in Tüskevár

- Flag Coat of arms

- Location of Veszprém county in Hungary

- Location of Tüskevár
- Coordinates: 47.11928°N 17.31382°E
- Country: Hungary
- County: Veszprém

Area
  - Total: 17.01 km^{2} (6.57 sq mi)

Population (2004)
  - Total: 586
  - Density: 34.45/km^{2} (89.2/sq mi)
- Time zone: UTC+1 (CET)
  - Summer (DST): UTC+2 (CEST)
- Postal code: 8477
- Area code: 88

Tüskevár is a village in Veszprém county, Hungary.
