= List of populated places in Hungary (B) =

This is a list of cities, towns and villages of Hungary

KEY: T = Town ; V = Village

Name	Rank	County	District	Population	Post code
Babarc	V	Baranya	Mohácsi	811	7757
Babarcszolos	V	Baranya	Siklósi	141	7814
Babócsa	V	Somogy	Barcsi	1,853	7584
Bábolna	T	Komárom-Esztergom	Komáromi	3,921	2943
Bábonymegyer	V	Somogy	Tabi	915	8658
Babosdöbréte	V	Zala	Zalaegerszegi	485	8983
Babót	V	Győr-Moson-Sopron	Kapuvári	1,168	9351
Bácsalmás	T	Bács-Kiskun	Bácsalmási	7,611	6430
Bácsbokod	V	Bács-Kiskun	Bajai	3,088	6453
Bácsborsód	V	Bács-Kiskun	Bajai	1,280	6454
Bácsszentgyörgy	V	Bács-Kiskun	Bajai	190	6511
Bácsszőlős	V	Bács-Kiskun	Bácsalmási	431	6425
Badacsonytomaj	T	Veszprém	Tapolcai	2,284	8258
Badacsonytördemic	V	Veszprém	Tapolcai	872	8263
Bag	V	Pest	Aszódi	3,929	2191
Bagamér	V	Hajdú-Bihar	Derecske–Létavértesi	2,449	4286
Baglad	V	Zala	Lenti	61	8977
Bagod	V	Zala	Zalaegerszegi	1,331	8992
Bágyogszovát	V	Gyor-Moson-Sopron	Csornai	1,353	9145
Baj	V	Komárom-Esztergom	Tatai	2,723	2836
Baja	T	Bács-Kiskun	Bajai	38,031	6500
Bajánsenye	V	Vas	Oriszentpéteri	558	9944
Bajna	V	Komárom-Esztergom	Dorogi	2,032	2525
Bajót	V	Komárom-Esztergom	Esztergomi	1,494	2533
Bak	V	Zala	Zalaegerszegi	1,784	8945
Bakháza	V	Somogy	Nagyatádi	250	7585
Bakóca	V	Baranya	Sásdi	342	7393
Bakonszeg	V	Hajdú-Bihar	Berettyóújfalui	1,256	4164
Bakonya	V	Baranya	Pécsi	401	7675
Bakonybánk	V	Komárom-Esztergom	Kisbéri	521	2885
Bakonybél	V	Veszprém	Zirci	1,445	8427
Bakonycsernye	V	Fejér	Móri	3,179	8056
Bakonygyirót	V	Gyor-Moson-Sopron	Pannonhalmi	180	8433
Bakonyjákó	V	Veszprém	Pápai	690	8581
Bakonykoppány	V	Veszprém	Pápai	228	8571
Bakonykúti	V	Fejér	Móri	106	8045
Bakonynána	V	Veszprém	Zirci	1,062	8422
Bakonyoszlop	V	Veszprém	Zirci	557	8418
Bakonypéterd	V	Gyor-Moson-Sopron	Pannonhalmi	301	9088
Bakonypölöske	V	Veszprém	Ajkai	421	8457
Bakonyság	V	Veszprém	Pápai	105	8557
Bakonysárkány	V	Komárom-Esztergom	Kisbéri	973	2861
Bakonyszentiván	V	Veszprém	Pápai	254	8557
Bakonyszentkirály	V	Veszprém	Zirci	917	8430
Bakonyszentlászló	V	Gyor-Moson-Sopron	Pannonhalmi	1,936	8431
Bakonyszombathely	V	Komárom-Esztergom	Kisbéri	1,513	2884
Bakonyszücs	V	Veszprém	Pápai	376	8572
Bakonytamási	V	Veszprém	Pápai	699	8555
Baks	V	Csongrád	Kisteleki	2,294	6768
Baksa	V	Baranya	Pécsi	765	7834
Baktakék	V	Borsod-Abaúj-Zemplén	Encsi	738	3836
Baktalórántháza	T	Szabolcs-Szatmár-Bereg	Baktalórántházai	4,309	4561
Baktüttös	V	Zala	Zalaegerszegi	364	8946
Balajt	V	Borsod-Abaúj-Zemplén	Edelényi	441	3780
Balassagyarmat	T	Nógrád	Balassagyarmati	17,664	2660
Balástya	V	Csongrád	Kisteleki	3,624	6764
Balaton	V	Heves	Bélapátfalvai	1,320	3347
Balatonakali	V	Veszprém	Balatonfüredi	743	8243
Balatonalmádi	T	Veszprém	Balatonalmádi	8,542	8220
Balatonberény	V	Somogy	Fonyódi	1,210	8649
Balatonboglár	T	Somogy	Fonyódi	6,055	8630
Balatoncsicsó	V	Veszprém	Balatonfüredi	169	8272
Balatonederics	V	Veszprém	Tapolcai	1,096	8312
Balatonendréd	V	Somogy	Siófoki	1,403	8613
Balatonfenyves	V	Somogy	Fonyódi	1,886	8646
Balatonfokajár	V	Veszprém	Balatonalmádi	1,465	8164
Balatonföldvár	T	Somogy	Balatonföldvári	2,091	8623
Balatonfüred	T	Veszprém	Balatonfüredi	13,265	8230
Balatonfűzfő	T	Veszprém	Balatonalmádi	4,223	8175
Balatongyörök	V	Zala	Keszthely–Hévízi	904	8313
Balatonhenye	V	Veszprém	Tapolcai	152	8275
Balatonkenese	V	Veszprém	Balatonalmádi	3,378	8174
Balatonkeresztúr	V	Somogy	Fonyódi	1,603	8648
Balatonlelle	T	Somogy	Fonyódi	5,017	8638
Balatonmagyaród	V	Zala	Nagykanizsai	523	8753
Balatonmáriafürdő	V	Somogy	Fonyódi	580	8647
Balatonőszöd	V	Somogy	Balatonföldvári	535	8637
Balatonrendes	V	Veszprém	Tapolcai	141	8255
Balatonszabadi	V	Somogy	Siófoki	2,895	8651
Balatonszárszó	V	Somogy	Balatonföldvári	2,027	8624
Balatonszemes	V	Somogy	Balatonföldvári	1,774	8636
Balatonszentgyörgy	V	Somogy	Fonyódi	1,673	8710
Balatonszepezd	V	Veszprém	Balatonfüredi	414	8252
Balatonszolos	V	Veszprém	Balatonfüredi	522	8230
Balatonudvari	V	Veszprém	Balatonfüredi	359	8242
Balatonújlak	V	Somogy	Marcali	604	8712
Balatonvilágos	V	Veszprém	Balatonalmádi	1,204	8171
Balinka	V	Fejér	Móri	1,002	8055
Balkány	V	Szabolcs-Szatmár-Bereg	Nagykállói	6,768	4233
Ballószög	V	Bács-Kiskun	Kecskeméti	2,849	6035
Balmazújváros	T	Hajdú-Bihar	Balmazújvárosi	18,149	4060
Balogunyom	V	Vas	Szombathelyi	1,193	9771
Balotaszállás	V	Bács-Kiskun	Kiskunhalasi	1,673	6412
Balsa	V	Szabolcs-Szatmár-Bereg	Ibrány–Nagyhalászi	938	4468
Bálványos	V	Somogy	Balatonföldvári	566	8614
Bana	V	Komárom-Esztergom	Komáromi	1,764	2944
Bánd	V	Veszprém	Veszprémi	661	8443
Bánfa	V	Baranya	Szigetvári	205	7914
Bánhorváti	V	Borsod-Abaúj-Zemplén	Kazincbarcikai	1,607	3642
Bánk	V	Nógrád	Rétsági	682	2653
Bánokszentgyörgy	V	Zala	Letenyei	705	8891
Bánréve	V	Borsod-Abaúj-Zemplén	Ózdi	1,454	3654
Bár	V	Baranya	Mohácsi	603	7711
Barabás	V	Szabolcs-Szatmár-Bereg	Vásárosnaményi	855	4937
Baracs	V	Fejér	Dunaújvárosi	3,380	2426
Baracska	V	Fejér	Ercsi	2,709	2471
Báránd	V	Hajdú-Bihar	Püspökladányi	2,709	4161
Baranyahídvég	V	Baranya	Sellyei	234	7841
Baranyajeno	V	Baranya	Sásdi	529	7384
Baranyaszentgyörgy	V	Baranya	Sásdi	194	7383
Barbacs	V	Gyor-Moson-Sopron	Csornai	769	9169
Barcs	T	Somogy	Barcsi	12,237	7570
Bárdudvarnok	V	Somogy	Kaposvári	1,209	7478
Barlahida	V	Zala	Lenti	169	8948
Bárna	V	Nógrád	Salgótarjáni	1,144	3126
Barnag	V	Veszprém	Veszprémi	101	8291
Bársonyos	V	Komárom-Esztergom	Kisbéri	835	2883
Basal	V	Baranya	Szigetvári	206	7922
Baskó	V	Borsod-Abaúj-Zemplén	Abaúj–Hegyközi	232	3881
Báta	V	Tolna	Szekszárdi	1,927	7149
Bátaapáti	V	Tolna	Bonyhádi	441	7164
Bátaszék	T	Tolna	Szekszárdi	6,894	7140
Baté	V	Somogy	Kaposvári	859	7258
Bátmonostor	V	Bács-Kiskun	Bajai	1,688	6528
Bátonyterenye	T	Nógrád	Bátonyterenyei	14,402	3070
Bátor	V	Heves	Bélapátfalvai	2,732	3336
Bátorliget	V	Szabolcs-Szatmár-Bereg	Nyírbátori	833	4343
Battonya	T	Békés	Mezokovácsházi	6,755	5830
Bátya	V	Bács-Kiskun	Kalocsai	2,210	6351
Batyk	V	Zala	Zalaszentgróti	415	8797
Bázakerettye	V	Zala	Letenyei	1,001	8887
Bazsi	V	Veszprém	Sümegi	465	8352
Béb	V	Veszprém	Pápai	248	8565
Becsehely	V	Zala	Letenyei	2,290	8866
Becske	V	Nógrád	Balassagyarmati	626	2693
Becskeháza	V	Borsod-Abaúj-Zemplén	Edelényi	50	3768
Becsvölgye	V	Zala	Zalaegerszegi	866	8985
Bedegkér	V	Somogy	Tabi	533	8666
Bedo	V	Hajdú-Bihar	Berettyóújfalui	307	4128
Bejcgyertyános	V	Vas	Sárvári	514	9683
Békás	V	Veszprém	Pápai	221	8515
Bekecs	V	Borsod-Abaúj-Zemplén	Szerencsi	2,501	3903
Békés	T	Békés	Békési	21,544	5630
Békéscsaba	county seat	Békés	Békéscsabai	66,377	5600
Békéssámson	V	Békés	Orosházi	2,627	5946
Békésszentandrás	V	Békés	Szarvasi	4,167	5561
Bekölce	V	Heves	Bélapátfalvai	1,377	3343
Bélapátfalva	V	Heves	Bélapátfalvai	3,663	3346
Bélavár	V	Somogy	Barcsi	435	7589
Belecska	V	Tolna	Tamási	386	7061
Beled	V	Gyor-Moson-Sopron	Kapuvári	2,899	9343
Beleg	V	Somogy	Nagyatádi	703	7543
Belezna	V	Zala	Nagykanizsai	882	8855
Bélmegyer	V	Békés	Békési	1,155	5643
Beloiannisz	V	Fejér	Adonyi	1,202	2455
Belsősárd	V	Zala	Lenti	118	8978
Belvárdgyula	V	Baranya	Mohácsi	461	7747
Benk	V	Szabolcs-Szatmár-Bereg	Kisvárdai	491	4643
Bénye	V	Pest	Monori	1,249	2216
Bér	V	Nógrád	Pásztói	452	3045
Bérbaltavár	V	Vas	Vasvári	562	9831
Bercel	V	Nógrád	Balassagyarmati	2,011	2687
Beregdaróc	V	Szabolcs-Szatmár-Bereg	Vásárosnaményi	855	4934
Beregsurány	V	Szabolcs-Szatmár-Bereg	Vásárosnaményi	636	4933
Berekböszörmény	V	Hajdú-Bihar	Berettyóújfalui	1,872	4116
Berekfurdo	V	Jász-Nagykun-Szolnok	Karcagi	919	5309
Beremend	V	Baranya	Siklósi	2,815	7827
Berente	V	Borsod-Abaúj-Zemplén	Kazincbarcikai	1,031	3704
Beret	V	Borsod-Abaúj-Zemplén	Encsi	270	3834
Berettyóújfalu	T	Hajdú-Bihar	Berettyóújfalui	16,107	4100
Berhida	V	Veszprém	Várpalotai	5,968	8181
Berkenye	V	Nógrád	Rétsági	599	2641
Berkesd	V	Baranya	Pécsváradi	920	7664
Berkesz	V	Szabolcs-Szatmár-Bereg	Baktalórántházai	955	4521
Bernecebaráti	V	Pest	Szobi	950	2639
Berzék	V	Borsod-Abaúj-Zemplén	Miskolci	1,053	3575
Berzence	V	Somogy	Csurgói	2,713	7516
Besence	V	Baranya	Sellyei	144	7964
Besenyod	V	Szabolcs-Szatmár-Bereg	Baktalórántházai	693	4557
Besenyőtelek	V	Heves	Füzesabonyi	4,910	3373
Besenyszög	V	Jász-Nagykun-Szolnok	Szolnoki	3,523	5071
Besnyő	V	Fejér	Adonyi	1,865	2456
Beszterec	V	Szabolcs-Szatmár-Bereg	Ibrány–Nagyhalászi	1,132	4488
Bezedek	V	Baranya	Mohácsi	287	7782
Bezenye	V	Gyor-Moson-Sopron	Mosonmagyaróvári	1,612	9223
Bezeréd	V	Zala	Zalaegerszegi	201	8934
Bezi	V	Gyor-Moson-Sopron	Csornai	412	9162
Biatorbágy	V	Pest	Budaörsi	8,591	2051
Bicsérd	V	Baranya	Szentlorinci	985	7671
Bicske	T	Fejér	Bicskei	11,160	2060
Bihardancsháza	V	Hajdú-Bihar	Püspökladányi	219	4175
Biharkeresztes	T	Hajdú-Bihar	Berettyóújfalui	4,227	4110
Biharnagybajom	V	Hajdú-Bihar	Püspökladányi	2,999	4172
Bihartorda	V	Hajdú-Bihar	Püspökladányi	982	4174
Biharugra	V	Békés	Sarkadi	1,071	5538
Bikács	V	Tolna	Paksi	490	7043
Bikal	V	Baranya	Sásdi	876	7346
Biri	V	Szabolcs-Szatmár-Bereg	Nagykállói	1,411	4235
Birján	V	Baranya	Pécsi	444	7747
Bisse	V	Baranya	Siklósi	249	7811
Boba	V	Vas	Celldömölki	846	9542
Bocfölde	V	Zala	Zalaegerszegi	1,046	8943
Boconád	V	Heves	Hevesi	2,955	3368
Bócsa	V	Bács-Kiskun	Kiskorösi	1,846	6235
Bocska	V	Zala	Nagykanizsai	364	8776
Bocskaikert	V	Hajdú-Bihar	Hajdúhadházi	2,637	4241
Boda	V	Baranya	Szentlorinci	425	7672
Bodajk	V	Fejér	Móri	4,103	8053
Bodmér	V	Fejér	Bicskei	215	8080
Bodolyabér	V	Baranya	Komlói	307	7394
Bodonhely	V	Gyor-Moson-Sopron	Téti	333	9134
Bodony	V	Heves	Pétervásárai	2,896	3243
Bodorfa	V	Veszprém	Sümegi	140	8471
Bodrog	V	Somogy	Kaposvári	475	7439
Bodroghalom	V	Borsod-Abaúj-Zemplén	Bodrogközi	1,377	3987
Bodrogkeresztúr	V	Borsod-Abaúj-Zemplén	Tokaji	1,325	3916
Bodrogkisfalud	V	Borsod-Abaúj-Zemplén	Tokaji	989	3917
Bodrogolaszi	V	Borsod-Abaúj-Zemplén	Sárospataki	972	3943
Bódvalenke	V	Borsod-Abaúj-Zemplén	Edelényi	194	3768
Bódvarákó	V	Borsod-Abaúj-Zemplén	Edelényi	154	3764
Bódvaszilas	V	Borsod-Abaúj-Zemplén	Edelényi	1,234	3763
Bogács	V	Borsod-Abaúj-Zemplén	Mezokövesdi	2,120	3412
Bogád	V	Baranya	Pécsi	842	7742
Bogádmindszent	V	Baranya	Sellyei	438	7836
Bogdása	V	Baranya	Sellyei	339	7966
Bogyiszló	V	Tolna	Szekszárdi	2,365	7132
Bogyoszló	V	Gyor-Moson-Sopron	Csornai	635	9324
Bojt	V	Hajdú-Bihar	Berettyóújfalui	567	4114
Bókaháza	V	Zala	Keszthely–Hévízi	341	8741
Bokod	V	Komárom-Esztergom	Oroszlányi	2,270	2855
Bokor	V	Nógrád	Pásztói	136	3066
Boldog	V	Heves	Hatvani	2,674	3016
Boldogasszonyfa	V	Baranya	Szigetvári	501	7937
Boldogkőújfalu	V	Borsod-Abaúj-Zemplén	Abaúj–Hegyközi	564	3884
Boldogkőváralja	V	Borsod-Abaúj-Zemplén	Abaúj–Hegyközi	1,170	3885
Boldva	V	Borsod-Abaúj-Zemplén	Edelényi	2,481	3794
Bolhás	V	Somogy	Nagyatádi	486	7517
Bolhó	V	Somogy	Barcsi	820	7586
Bóly	T	Baranya	Mohácsi	3,770	7754
Boncodfölde	V	Zala	Zalaegerszegi	244	8992
Bonyhád	T	Tolna	Bonyhádi	14,176	7150
Bonyhádvarasd	V	Tolna	Bonyhádi	497	7158
Bonnya	V	Somogy	Tabi	325	7281
Bordány	V	Csongrád	Mórahalmi	3,182	6795
Borgáta	V	Vas	Celldömölki	159	9554
Borjád	V	Baranya	Mohácsi	449	7756
Borota	V	Bács-Kiskun	Jánoshalmi	1,599	6445
Borsfa	V	Zala	Letenyei	768	8885
Borsodbóta	V	Borsod-Abaúj-Zemplén	Ózdi	951	3658
Borsodgeszt	V	Borsod-Abaúj-Zemplén	Mezokövesdi	303	3426
Borsodivánka	V	Borsod-Abaúj-Zemplén	Mezokövesdi	751	3462
Borsodnádasd	T	Borsod-Abaúj-Zemplén	Ózdi	3,573	3671
Borsodszentgyörgy	V	Borsod-Abaúj-Zemplén	Ózdi	1,361	3623
Borsodszirák	V	Borsod-Abaúj-Zemplén	Edelényi	1,214	3796
Borsosberény	V	Nógrád	Rétsági	1,040	2644
Borszörcsök	V	Veszprém	Ajkai	405	8479
Borzavár	V	Veszprém	Zirci	792	8428
Bosta	V	Baranya	Pécsi	143	7811
Botpalád	V	Szabolcs-Szatmár-Bereg	Fehérgyarmati	601	4955
Botykapeterd	V	Baranya	Szigetvári	368	7900
Bozzai	V	Vas	Szombathelyi	307	9752
Bozsok	V	Vas	Koszegi	381	9727
Bózsva	V	Borsod-Abaúj-Zemplén	Sátoraljaújhelyi	224	3994
Bo	V	Vas	Csepregi	684	9625
Bocs	V	Borsod-Abaúj-Zemplén	Miskolci	2,763	3574
Böde	V	Zala	Zalaegerszegi	301	8991
Bödeháza	V	Zala	Lenti	89	8969
Bögöt	V	Vas	Sárvári	391	9612
Bögöte	V	Vas	Sárvári	339	9675
Böhönye	V	Somogy	Marcali	2,521	8719
Bököny	V	Szabolcs-Szatmár-Bereg	Nagykállói	3,275	4231
Bölcske	V	Tolna	Paksi	2,984	7025
Bony	V	Gyor-Moson-Sopron	Gyori	2,229	9073
Börcs	V	Gyor-Moson-Sopron	Gyori	1,040	9152
Börzönce	V	Zala	Nagykanizsai	69	8772
Bősárkány	V	Gyor-Moson-Sopron	Csornai	2,199	9167
Bőszénfa	V	Somogy	Kaposvári	606	7475
Bucsa	V	Békés	Szeghalmi	2,549	5527
Bucsu	V	Vas	Szombathelyi	600	9792
Búcsúszentlászló	V	Zala	Zalaegerszegi	886	8925
Bucsuta	V	Zala	Letenyei	267	8893
Budajeno	V	Pest	Pilisvörösvári	1,380	2093
Budakalász	V	Pest	Szentendrei	9,507	2011
Budakeszi	T	Pest	Pilisvörösvári	12,924	2092
Budaörs	T	Pest	Budaörsi	24,586	2040
Budapest	capital	Pest	Budapesti	1,695,000	1000^{*}
Bugac	V	Bács-Kiskun	Kiskunfélegyházi	3,108	6114
Bugacpusztaháza	V	Bács-Kiskun	Kiskunfélegyházi	353	6114
Bugyi	V	Pest	Gyáli	5,272	2347
Buj	V	Szabolcs-Szatmár-Bereg	Ibrány–Nagyhalászi	2,456	4483
Buják	V	Nógrád	Pásztói	2,386	3047
Buzsák	V	Somogy	Lengyeltóti	1,451	8695
Bük	V	Vas	Csepregi	3,213	9737
Bükkábrány	V	Borsod-Abaúj-Zemplén	Mezokövesdi	1,683	3422
Bükkaranyos	V	Borsod-Abaúj-Zemplén	Miskolci	1,445	3554
Bükkmogyorósd	V	Borsod-Abaúj-Zemplén	Ózdi	174	3648
Bükkösd	V	Baranya	Szentlorinci	1,308	7682
Bükkszék	V	Heves	Pétervásárai	1,530	3335
Bükkszenterzsébet	V	Heves	Pétervásárai	2,486	3257
Bükkszentkereszt	V	Borsod-Abaúj-Zemplén	Miskolci	1,265	3557
Bükkszentmárton	V	Heves	Bélapátfalvai	826	3346
Bükkzsérc	V	Borsod-Abaúj-Zemplén	Mezokövesdi	1,091	3414
Bürüs	V	Baranya	Szigetvári	103	7973
Büssü	V	Somogy	Kaposvári	442	7273
Büttös	V	Borsod-Abaúj-Zemplén	Encsi	235	3821

== Notes ==
- Cities marked with * have several different post codes, the one here is only the most general one.
