= Pápa District =

Pápa District Pápai járás
- Districts of Hungary
- Flag Coat of arms

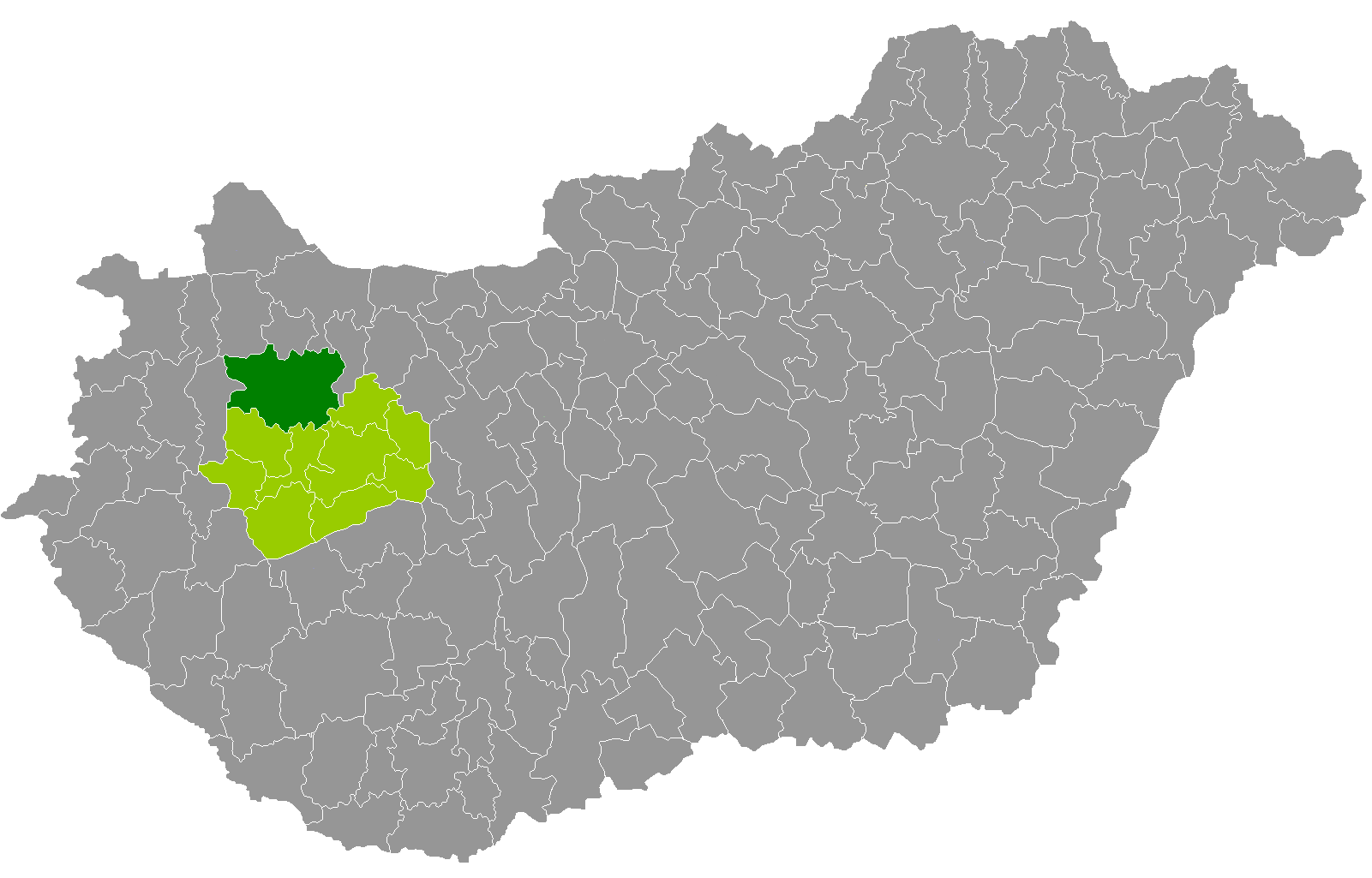
- Pápa District within Hungary and Veszprém County.
- Coordinates: 47.3270°N 17.4706°E
- Country: Hungary
- County: Veszprém
- District seat: Pápa

Area
  - Total: 1,022.09 km^{2} (394.63 sq mi)
  - Rank: 1st in Veszprém

Population (2011 census)
  - Total: 59,310
  - Rank: 2nd in Veszprém
  - Density: 58/km^{2} (150/sq mi)

Pápa (Hungarian: Pápai járás) is a district in north-western part of Veszprém County. Pápa is also the name of the town where the district seat is found. The district is located in the Central Transdanubia Statistical Region.

== Geography ==
Pápa District borders with Csorna District, Tét District and Győr District (Győr-Moson-Sopron County) to the north, Pannonhalma District (Győr-Moson-Sopron County) and Zirc District to the east, Veszprém District, Ajka District and Devecser District to the south, Celldömölk District (Vas County) to the west. The number of the inhabited places in Pápa District is 49.

== Municipalities ==
The district has 1 town and 48 villages (as of 1 January 2013).

- Adásztevel (801)
- Bakonyjákó (634)
- Bakonykoppány (192)
- Bakonypölöske (373)
- Bakonyság (49)
- Bakonyszentiván (220)
- Bakonyszücs (322)
- Bakonytamási (627)
- Béb (240)
- Békás (216)
- Csót (1,003)
- Dáka (631)
- Döbrönte (246)
- Egyházaskesző (555)
- Ganna (231)
- Gecse (389)
- Gic (370)
- Homokbödöge (701)
- Kemeneshőgyész (460)
- Kemenesszentpéter (648)
- Kup (475)
- Külsővat (795)
- Lovászpatona (1,154)
- Magyargencs (512)
- Malomsok (507)
- Marcalgergelyi (390)
- Marcaltő (772)
- Mezőlak (1,035)
- Mihályháza (782)
- Nagyacsád (637)
- Nagydém (347)
- Nagygyimót (567)
- Nagytevel (512)
- Nemesgörzsöny (723)
- Nemesszalók (923)
- Németbánya (94)
- Nóráp (205)
- Nyárád (951)
- **Pápa** (31,528) – district seat
- Pápadereske (286)
- Pápakovácsi (573)
- Pápasalamon (370)
- Pápateszér (1,166)
- Takácsi (882)
- Ugod (1,402)
- Vanyola (540)
- Várkesző (152)
- Vaszar (1,507)
- Vinár (240)

The bolded municipality is city.

== See also ==
- List of cities and towns in Hungary
