= Rheem =

Rheem may refer to:

== People ==
- Chino Rheem (born 1980), American poker player
- William Rheem (1862–1919), American oil executive

== Other ==
- Rheem Creek, stream in western Contra Costa County, California
- Rheem Manufacturing Company
- Rheem Theatre, motion picture theater located in Moraga, California
- Rheem, California (disambiguation), places in California

== See also ==
- Fort Smith Classic, golf tournament; previously the Rheem Classic
- Rheam, surname
- Rheems, Pennsylvania
