= Nagykanizsa–Körmend offensive =

1945 offensive of the World War II Eastern Front

- Part of the Eastern Front of World War II
Date	26 March – 15 April 1945
Location	Western Hungary-Southeast Austria
Result	Allied victory: Hungary liberated from German occupation; Defeat of all Axis forces in Hungary

Belligerents
Bulgaria; Soviet Union; Yugoslav Partisans	Germany (Independent State of Croatia) Croatia; Hungary

Commanders and leaders
Vladimir Stoychev (Soviet Union) Mikhail Sharokhin (Yugoslav Partisans) Josip Broz Tito	(Nazi Germany) Otto Wöhler

Units involved
1st Army; 57th Army (Yugoslav Partisans) Unknown	2nd Panzer Army

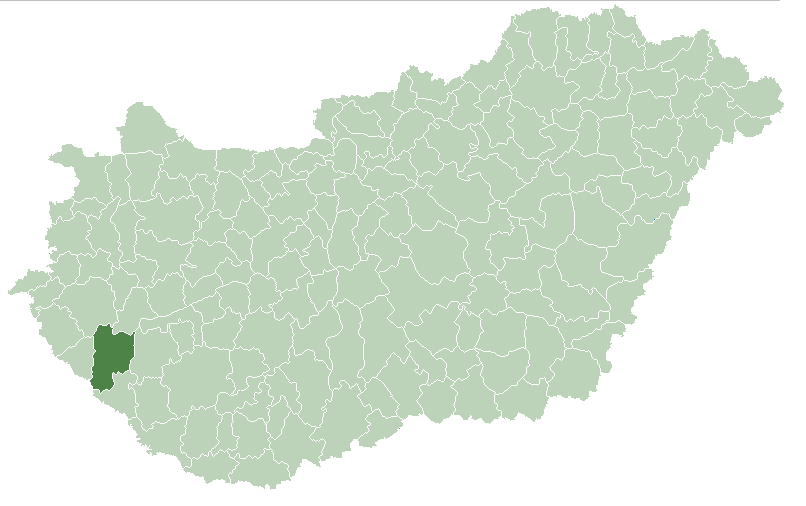
Location of the Nagykanizsa District in modern-day Hungary

The Nagykanizsa–Körmend offensive, carried out between 26 March and 15 April 1945, was part of the 3rd Ukrainian Front's Vienna offensive during World War II against Army Group South (including Hungarian and Croatian) forces defending the Kisbajom–Nagykorpád–Nagyatád–Heresznye defensive line north of the Drava river and west of Lake Balaton.

The objective of the operation was to cut the Axis access to the oil wells and fuel processing plants in the Nagykanizsa region west of Lake Balaton for the protection of which the Army Group South force built up three defensive lines behind the natural water obstacle of the Mura river linked to the western shore of the lake. The German reference to this operation is the "Budapest front".

The bulk of the forces for the operation consisted of the Bulgarian 1st Army with two Corps composed of six infantry divisions and other smaller units (~100,000 troops) which advanced on the southern flank of the 3rd Ukrainian Front, with the 57th Army positioned to its east (6th Guards Rifle Corps, and 64th and 133rd Rifle Corps), and the other three Armies of the Front concentrated in the area between Lake Balaton and Budapest. The South-western flank was occupied by the Yugoslav partisans.

The primary opponent on this sector of the front was the 2nd Panzer Army which included the LXVIII and XXII Mountain Corps.

After the successful 2nd Ukrainian Front's Kecskemét–Budapest offensive (29 October 1944 – 10 December 1944) and Szolnok–Budapest offensive (29 October 1944 – 10 December 1944) east of Balaton, the German forces south-west of the lake retreated, which aided the Bulgarian advance. The Bulgarian 1st Army breached the first two defensive Axis lines and crossed the Mura river. They then assumed a defensive posture at the Veliki Kog-Yastrebtzi line and remained there until 7 May.

On 7 May, they resumed their advance, which soon became a pursuit of a fleeing enemy and the capture of the remnants of the Wehrmacht and Hungarian troops. By 13 May 1945, the Bulgarian 1st Army reached the Austrian Alps in the Klagenfurt area where they met the British Eighth Army.

== Sources ==
- David Glantz (ed.), 1986 Art of War symposium, From the Vistula to the Oder: Soviet Offensive Operations – October 1944 – March 1945, A transcript of Proceedings, Center for Land Warfare, US Army War College, 19–23 May 1986
- Bishop, Chris, The Military Atlas of World War II, Igloo Books, London, 2005 ISBN 1-904687-53-9
