= Somogyszob =

- Village
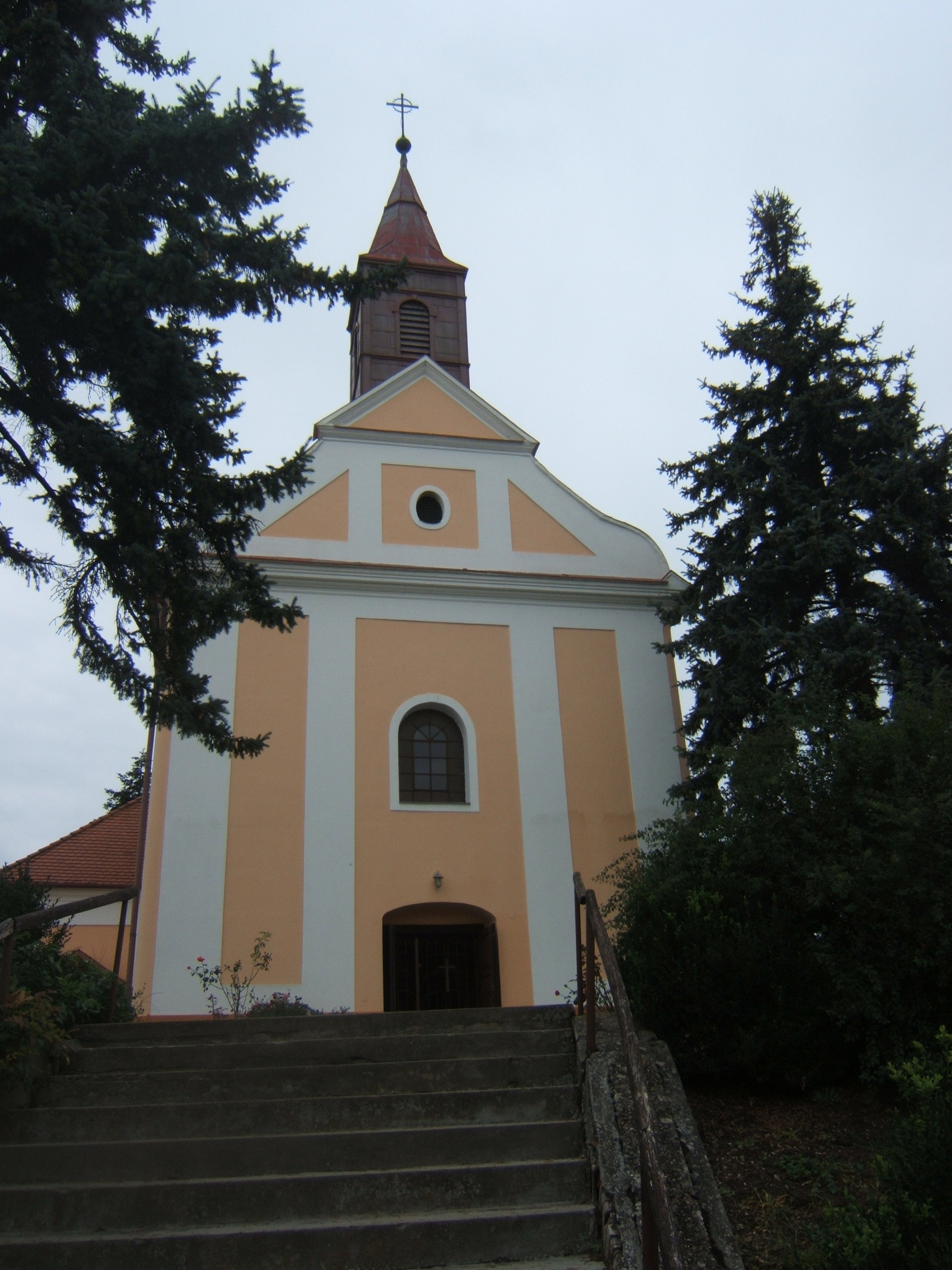
- Roman Catholic Church of Somogyszob

- Coat of arms

- Location of Somogy county in Hungary

- Location of Somogyszob
- Coordinates: 46.29282°N 17.29577°E
- Country: Hungary
- Region: Southern Transdanubia
- County: Somogy
- District: Nagyatád
- RC Diocese: Kaposvár

Area
  - Total: 40.08 km^{2} (15.47 sq mi)

Population (2017)
  - Total: 1,509
  - Density: 37.65/km^{2} (97.51/sq mi)
- Demonym(s): szobi, somogyszobi
- Time zone: UTC+1 (CET)
  - Summer (DST): UTC+2 (CEST)
- Postal code: 7563
- Area code: (+36) 82
- NUTS 3 code: HU232
- MP: László Szászfalvi (KDNP)
- Website: Somogyszob Online

Somogyszob is a village in Somogy county, Hungary. It is situated on the southwest side of Somogy county, approximately 8 km north from Nagyatád.

== Geography ==
The village is located near Kaszó and is surrounded by forests with rich natural circumstances.

== History ==
Somogyszob originally in the 11th and 12th century belonged to Següsd county. In 1295 it was donated to László comes. In 1331 it was mentioned as Zoob, later in 1366 named Poss. In 1484 Son of Szobi Péter donated it to Mihály Batthyány Boldizsár and Gerebeni László. In 1550 Várday Zsigmond was the landlord. At time of the Rákóczi's War for Independence the village was destroyed and the people fled to the woods and swamps. The name Szob appeared around 1901. The name of the current form was first mentioned in 1907.

== Main sights ==
- The sights of Somogyszob are the Lutheran, Catholic and Protestant Churches.
- At the center of the village is the Primary school which is a beautiful landscaped area. Behind of the school there is a Holiday Lake with walkways and rest stops.
- The "Vilma-House" is one of the pride of the settlement, it is the village's oldest surviving intact residential building, which was reconstructed in 2003.

== Culture ==
The Hungarian folk song Lement a nap a maga járásán was collected in 1898 in Somogyszob by Béla Vikár.
