= Rheem, California (disambiguation) =

Rheem, California may refer to:

- Rheem, California, unincorporated community
- Rheem, San Pablo, California, neighborhood
- Rheem, former name of Moraga, California
