= Rheem Valley, California =

Rheem Valley, California may refer to:

- Rheem Valley, former name of Rheem, California
- Rheem Valley, formerly an unincorporated area of Contra Costa County, California. Now part of Moraga, California
