= Háromfa =

Háromfa Aromec (in Croatian)
- Village
- Coat of arms

- Location of Somogy county in Hungary

- Location of Háromfa
- Coordinates: 46.10507°N 17.33137°E
- Country: Hungary
- Region: Southern Transdanubia
- County: Somogy
- District: Nagyatád
- RC Diocese: Kaposvár

Area
  - Total: 42.14 km^{2} (16.27 sq mi)

Population (2024)
  - Total: 629
  - Density: 14.9/km^{2} (38.7/sq mi)
- Demonym: háromfai
- Time zone: UTC+1 (CET)
  - Summer (DST): UTC+2 (CEST)
- Postal code: 7585
- Area code: (+36) 82
- NUTS 3 code: HU232
- MP: László Szászfalvi (KDNP)
- Website: Háromfa Online

Háromfa (Croatian: Aromec) is a village in Somogy county, Hungary.

== Etymology ==
The village was earlier called Háromfafalva (English: three trees village) which got shortened to Háromfa (English: three trees). The earlier seal and its coat of arms also have three poplars.
