= Tarany =

Tarany Taran (in Slovene)
- Village
- Coat of arms

- Location of Somogy county in Hungary

- Location of Tarany
- Coordinates: 46.18231°N 17.30903°E
- Country: Hungary
- Region: Southern Transdanubia
- County: Somogy
- District: Nagyatád
- RC Diocese: Kaposvár

Area
  - Total: 54.68 km^{2} (21.11 sq mi)

Population (2017)
  - Total: 1,155
  - Density: 21.12/km^{2} (54.71/sq mi)
- Demonym: taranyi
- Time zone: UTC+1 (CET)
  - Summer (DST): UTC+2 (CEST)
- Postal code: 7514
- Area code: (+36) 82
- NUTS 3 code: HU232
- MP: László Szászfalvi (KDNP)
- Website: Tarany Online

Tarany (Slovene: Taran) is a village in Somogy county, Hungary. It is one of the villages in which some traditions of the Somogy Slovenes have survived.
