= Rinyabesenyő =

- Village
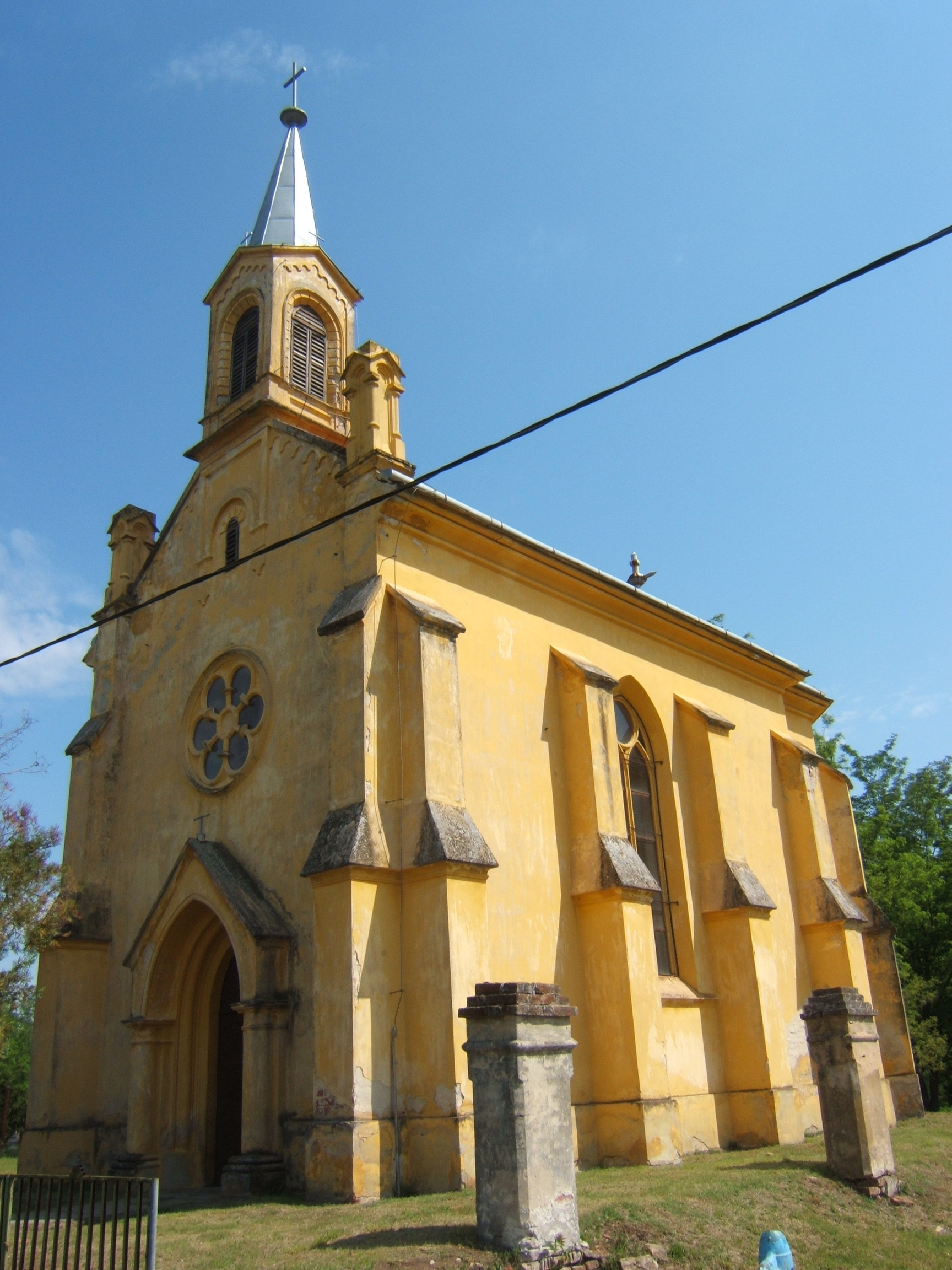
- Kalazanci Szent József-kápolna (English: Saint Joseph Calasantius Chapel) in Rinyabesenyő

- Coat of arms

- Location of Somogy county in Hungary

- Location of Rinyabesenyő
- Coordinates: 46.16684°N 17.51609°E
- Country: Hungary
- Region: Southern Transdanubia
- County: Somogy
- District: Nagyatád
- RC Diocese: Kaposvár

Area
  - Total: 28.63 km^{2} (11.05 sq mi)

Population (2017)
  - Total: 224
  - Density: 7.82/km^{2} (20.3/sq mi)
- Demonym(s): besenyői, rinyabesenyői
- Time zone: UTC+1 (CET)
  - Summer (DST): UTC+2 (CEST)
- Postal code: 7552
- Area code: (+36) 82
- NUTS 3 code: HU232
- MP: László Szászfalvi (KDNP)
- Website: Rinyabesenyő Online

Rinyabesenyő is a village in Somogy county, Hungary.
