= Nagyatád =

- Town
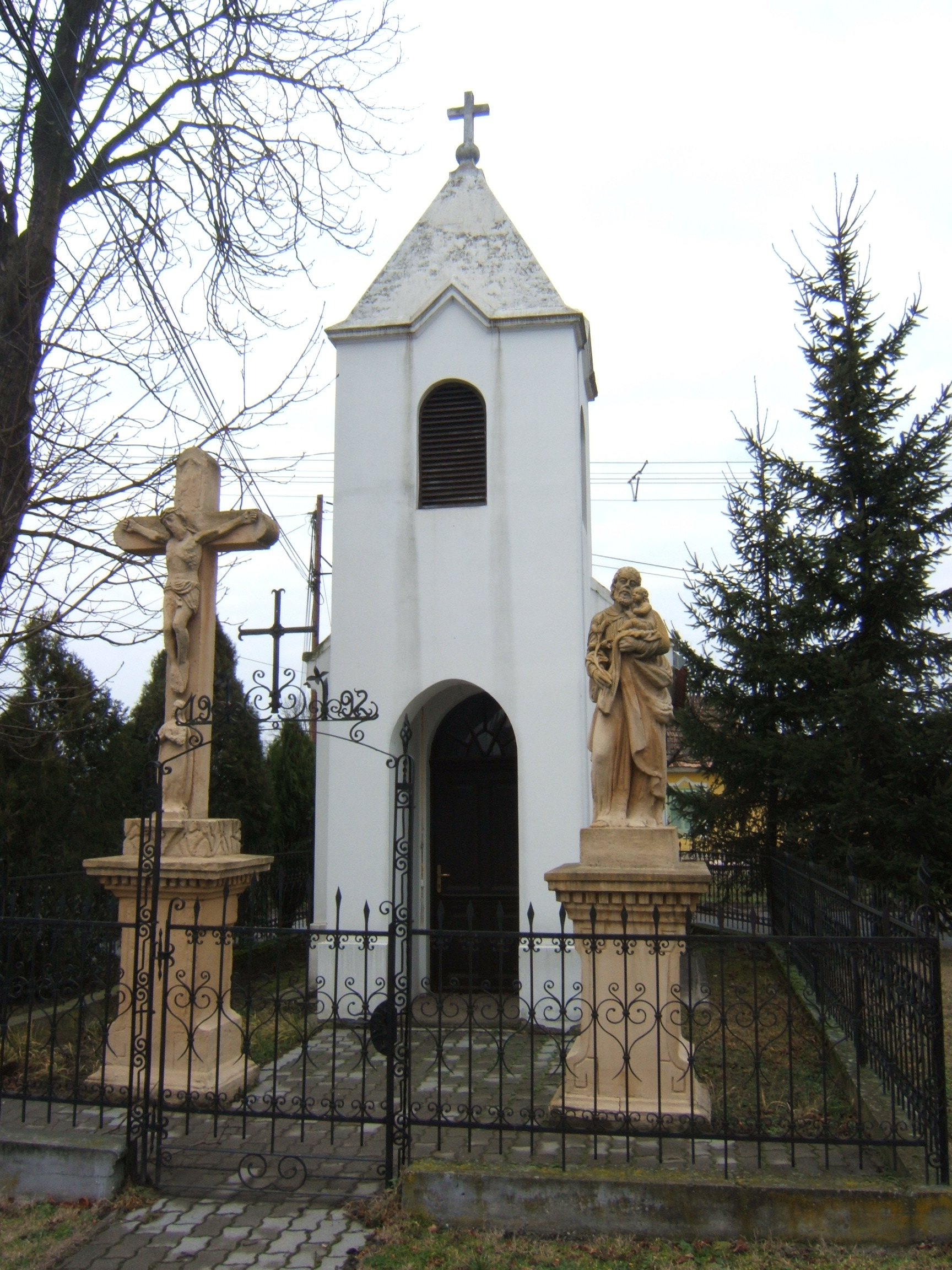
- Chapel of Henész in Nagyatád

- Flag Coat of arms

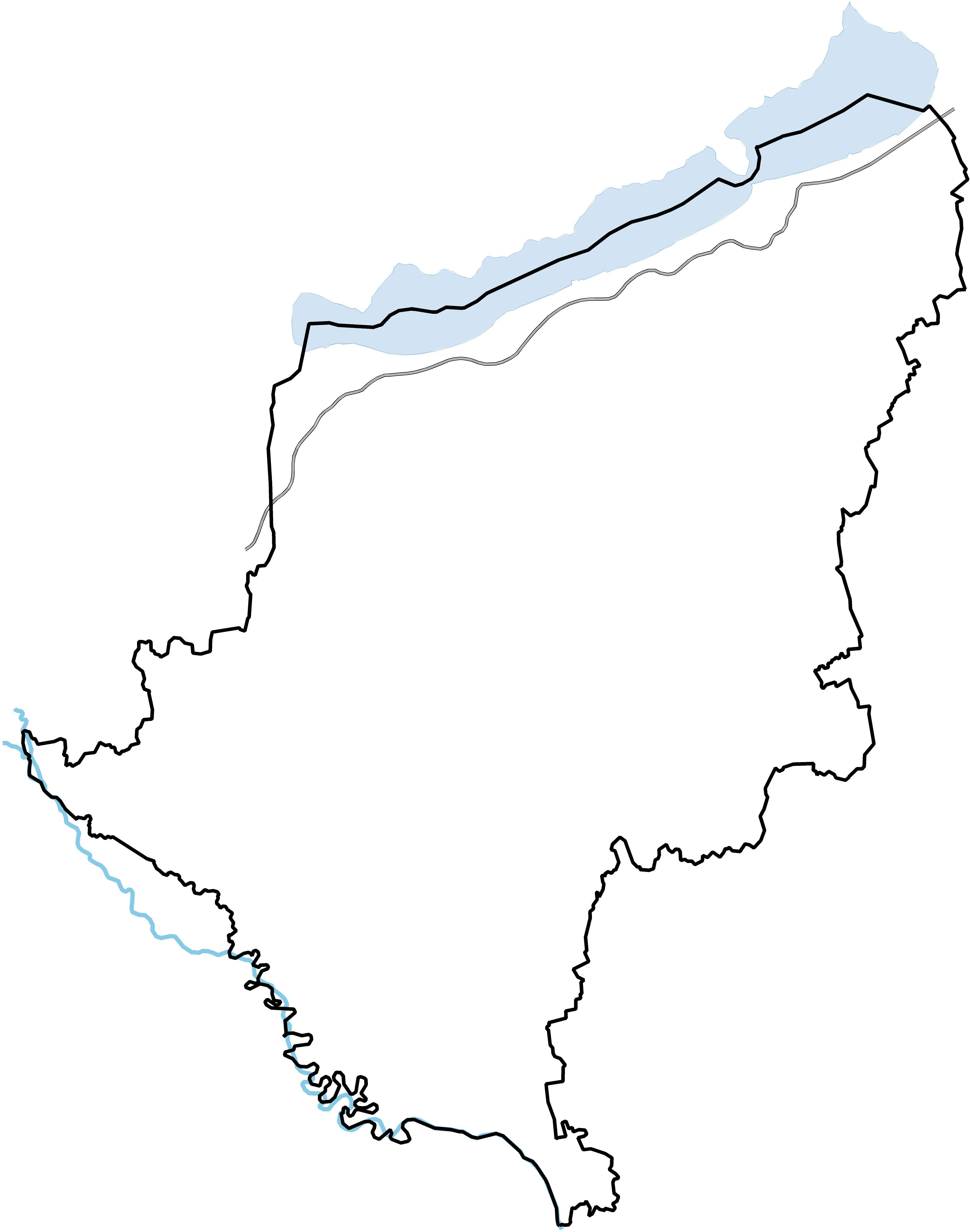
- Location of Nagyatád Nagyatád (Hungary)
- Coordinates: 46.22265°N 17.36428°E
- Country: Hungary
- Region: Southern Transdanubia
- County: Somogy
- District: Nagyatád
- RC Diocese: Kaposvár

Government
  - Mayor: László Ludas (FIDESZ-KDNP)

Area
  - Total: 70.6 km^{2} (27.3 sq mi)

Population (2017)
  - Total: 10,348
  - Density: 147/km^{2} (380/sq mi)
- Demonym: nagyatádi
- Time zone: UTC+1 (CET)
  - Summer (DST): UTC+2 (CEST)
- Postal code: 7500
- Area code: (+36) 82
- Patron Saint: Saint Roch
- NUTS 3 code: HU232
- MP: László Szászfalvi (KDNP)
- Website: Nagyatád Online

Nagyatád is a town in Somogy County, Hungary and the seat of Nagyatád District. Bodvica, Henész and Kivadár are parts of Nagyatád.

== Etymology ==
Its name derives from the Turkish word ata (Hungarian: atya, apa, English: father).

== Geography ==
It lies on the southern side of Inner Somogy, 60 km south of Lake Balaton on the main road 68.

== History ==
Nagyatád was established during the Hungarian conquest by the Horka tribe. However this region was already inhabited in prehistoric times. It was first mentioned in 1190 in official documents. At that time the settlement was situated at the northern part of today's Nagyatád. It was also mentioned in 1382 as Populi et cives in villa Athad and was part of Segesd County. It was of Queen Elizabeth, later it belonged to the Anthimi then to the Batthyány family. In 1395 György Kis de Kővágóörs got the village. But in 1403 it was already in the hands of János Anthimi. It got market town rights in 1475 from Matthias Corvinus and therefore it became an important commercial centre. Boldizsár Batthyány and András Alapi owned the settlement in 1475. In 1550 it belonged to Kristóf Batthyány. Thanks to its favorable location vivid trade flourished there until the Turkish occupation when it almost perished. According to the Turkish tax register there were only 8 households in 1554. Between 1565 and 1571 it listed just 12 houses. Meanwhile, the Hungarian nobles still claimed it as their territory. In 1573 Pál Czindery owned it. Between 1598 and 1599 Kristóf Pethő was its owner. According to the tithe register of the Pannonhalma Archabbey the settlement was divided in to parts, Atád and Kis-Atád (English: Small Atád) and belonged to the Diocese of Székesfehérvár.

After the expulsion of the Turkish forces Slovene and Croatian settlers arrived. In 1697 Serbians plundered the village. During Rákóczi's War of Independence the Franciscans left Nagyatád in 1703. they returned in 1731. It experienced a rapid economic development during the 18th century. In 1744 it got market town rights again. The town changed hands several times until it became Keresztély Lelbach's possession. New operating facilities opened in there. In 1906 thermal water was found 410 m deep from which its thermal bath grew. The villages of Bodvica, Henész and Kivadár became parts of Nagyatád in 1941. On April 28, 1971 Nagyatád officially became a town. Between 1984 and 1994 Ötvöskónyi was part of Nagyatád.

== Economy ==
Several companies have production facilities in the town like the Italian-owned wood manufacturer Diófa, the Hungarian Nagyatádi Konzervgyár (English: Tinfactory of Nagyatád, est. 1939), the Hungarian sweet manufacturer Chocoland, the Hungarian metal producer Büttner, the Hungarian fruit producer Agromarker 2000 and the German deep-frozen bakery producer DEH.

== Main sights ==
- only one long distance triathlon championship in Hungary in every July
- Franciscan Monastery
- Holy Cross Church
- Saint Roch Chapel
- Mándl Mansion
- Statue Park
- Town Museum
- Military Park
- Thermal Bath and Spa of Nagyatád - 32°C, 38°C and 42°C warm water especially for treating Rheam, gynecological and articular problems
- Beach and Camping of Nagyatád

== Notable residents ==
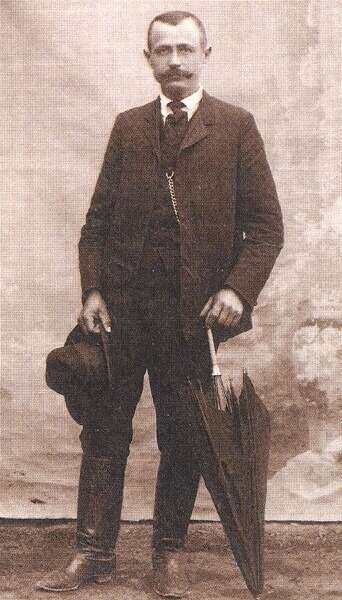
István Szabó de Nagyatád is the most well-known resident of the town

- Imre Mudin (1887 – 1918), Hungarian teacher, soldier, track and field athlete
- József Ángyán (born 1952), Hungarian agriculture engineer, professor, politician
- Szeréna Stern (1894 – 1966), Hungarian politician
- Nicholas Zámbó (? - 1395), Hungarian treasurer, judge
- József Babay (1898–1956), Hungarian writer, journalist
- József Somssich (1864 – 1941), Hungarian politician, Minister of Foreign Affairs (1919–1920)
- István Szabó de Nagyatád (1863 – 1924), Hungarian politician, Minister of Agriculture (1919, 1920–1921, 1922–1924)

=== Sports ===
- Timuzsin Schuch (born 1985), Hungarian handballer
- Anikó Kovacsics (born 1991), Hungarian handballer
- Péter Szakály (born 1986), Hungarian footballer
- Ivett Kurucz (born 1994), Hungarian handballer
- Tamás Borsos (born 1990), Hungarian handballer
- Ferenc Füzesi (born 1960), Hungarian handballer
- Kornél Kulcsár (born 1991), Hungarian footballer
- Dénes Szakály (born 1988), Hungarian footballer
- Renáta Tobai-Sike (born 1978), Hungarian shooter

== Sport ==
- Nagyatádi FC, association football club

== Twin towns – sister cities ==
Nagyatád is twinned with:

- Debeljača (Kovačica), Serbia
- Križevci, Croatia
- Nußloch, Germany
- San Vito al Tagliamento, Italy
- Târgu Secuiesc, Romania
- Tvrdošovce, Slovakia
