= Lábod =

- Village
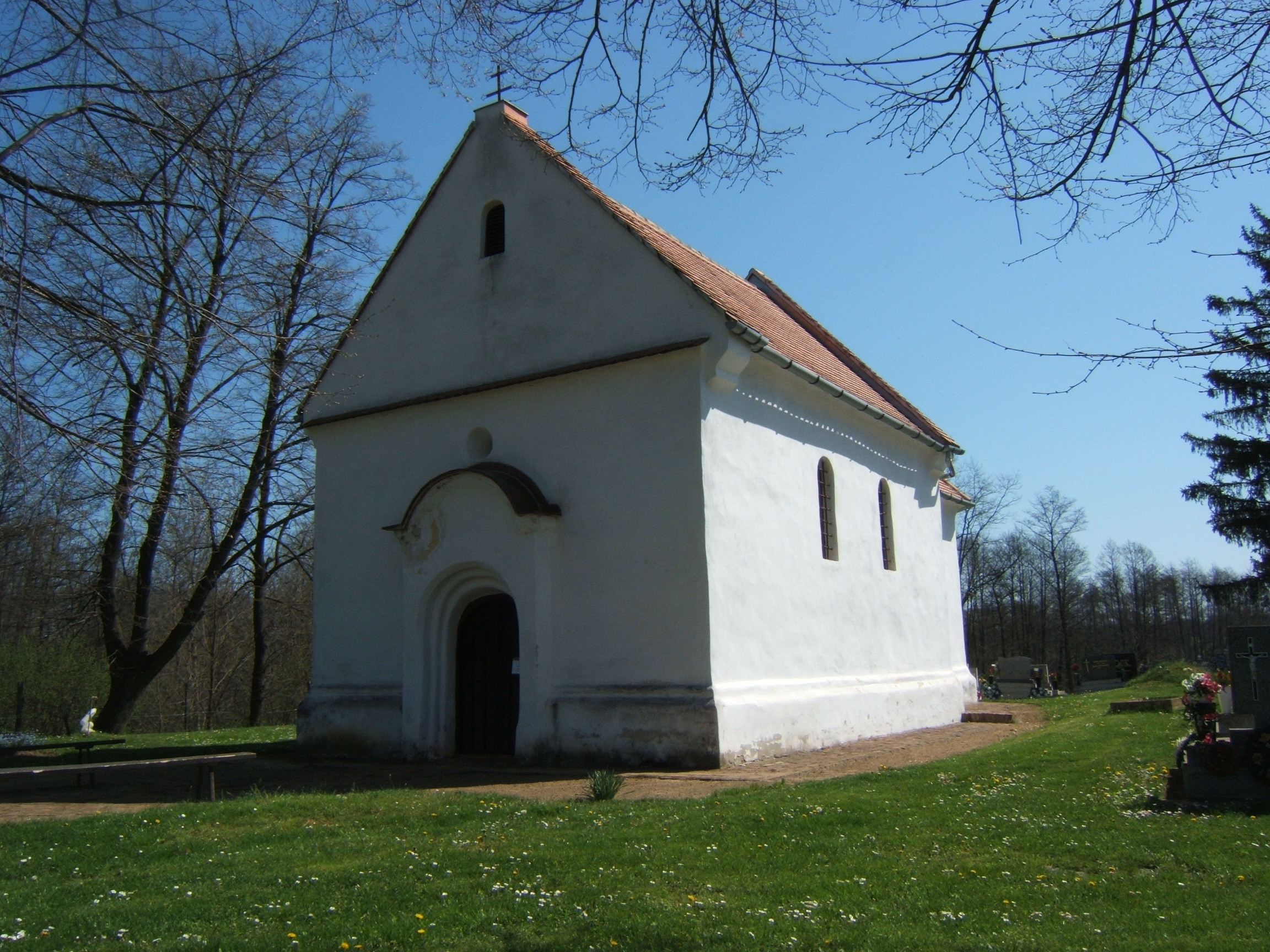
- Cemetery chapel in Lábod

- Coat of arms

- Location of Somogy county in Hungary

- Location of Lábod
- Coordinates: 46.20143°N 17.45692°E
- Country: Hungary
- Region: Southern Transdanubia
- County: Somogy
- District: Nagyatád
- RC Diocese: Kaposvár

Area
  - Total: 66.51 km^{2} (25.68 sq mi)

Population (2017)
  - Total: 1,878
  - Density: 28.24/km^{2} (73.13/sq mi)
- Demonym: lábodi
- Time zone: UTC+1 (CET)
  - Summer (DST): UTC+2 (CEST)
- Postal code: 7551
- Area code: (+36) 82
- NUTS 3 code: HU232
- MP: László Szászfalvi (KDNP)
- Website: Lábod Online

Lábod is a village in Somogy county, Hungary.

== Etymology ==
Its name derives from the Hungarian word láb (English: leg) which was also the name of the first owner of the village. There is a local joke about it: What flows between your legs? - Brook Rinya. Because the Brook Rinya divides the settlement in two parts: Kis-Lábod and Nagy-Lábod.

== History ==
According to László Szita the settlement was completely Hungarian in the 18th century.
