= Kutas, Hungary =

Kutas
- Village
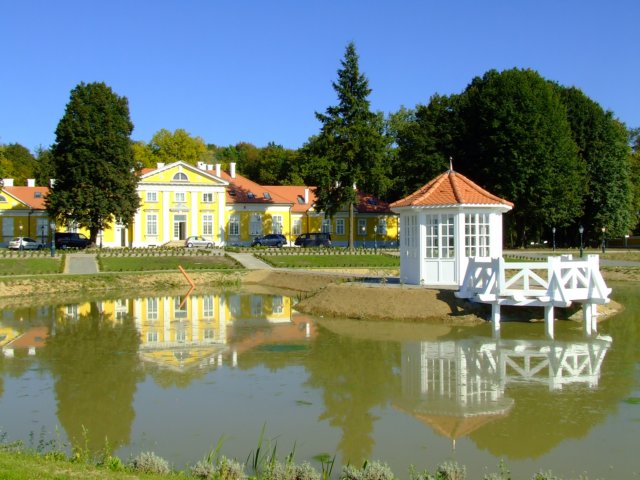
- Hertelendy Mansion in Kutas

- Coat of arms
- Interactive map of Kutas
- Location of Kutas
- Coordinates: 46.33471°N 17.45626°E
- Country: Hungary
- Region: Southern Transdanubia
- County: Somogy
- District: Nagyatád
- RC Diocese: Kaposvár

Area
  - Total: 36.55 km^{2} (14.11 sq mi)

Population (2017)
  - Total: 1,475
  - Density: 40.36/km^{2} (104.5/sq mi)
- Demonym: kutasi
- Time zone: UTC+1 (CET)
  - Summer (DST): UTC+2 (CEST)
- Postal code: 7541
- Area code: (+36) 82
- NUTS 3 code: HU232
- MP: László Szászfalvi (KDNP)
- Website: Kutas Online

Kutas (Hungarian pronunciation: [ˈkutɒʃ]) is a village in Somogy county, Hungary.

== History ==
According to László Szita the settlement was completely Hungarian in the 18th century.
