= Szeréna Stern =

Hungarian feminist and politician

- Born: 15 June 1894; Nagyatád, Kingdom of Hungary
- Died: 2 March 1966 (aged 71)
- Other names: 'Somogyi'
- Occupations: Feminist and politician
- Spouse: Ferenc Pollák
- Awards: Gold Medal of Merit

Szeréna Stern (15 June 1894 – 2 March 1966) was a Hungarian feminist and politician.

== Life ==
Szeréna Stern was born in Nagyatád, Kingdom of Hungary on 15 June 1894 to a poor Jewish family. Her early life is poorly documented, but she trained as an elementary school teacher and joined the teachers' union about 1917. Sometime during the 1920s she married Ferenc Pollák and they had no children. He died sometime after 1942 when he was taken by the government for forced labor. Stern was awarded the Gold Medal of Merit in 1947 and probably received the Gold Order of Labor in 1964. She died on 2 March 1966.

== Activities ==
Stern was one of the principal organizers of the Children's Friends Association of the Workers of Hungary (Hungarian: Magyarországi Munkások Gyermekbarát Egyesülete) in 1917 and later served as its secretary. She joined the Social Democratic Party of Hungary (Hungarian: Magyarországi Szociáldemokrata Párt (MSZDP)) in 1918 and was elected to the party's National Women's Organizing Committee (Hungarian: Országos Nőszervező Bizottság) in 1920. When making public appearances during this time, she often used the pseudonym 'Somogyi'. Stern was elected to the Budapest Municipal Council in 1925 and focused her energies on women's and children's issues. She was elected to the Education Commission, the Commission for Social Policy and Welfare and the Commission for Child Protection at various times before she was forced to resign in 1940 when the Second Jewish Law was passed. After World War II, Stern became the first woman to lead the Department of Societal Policy (Hungarian: Társadalompolitikai Ügyosztály) and retired in late 1950 when it was clear that municipal self-government was going to be abolished by the Communist government.
