= Szabás =

- Village
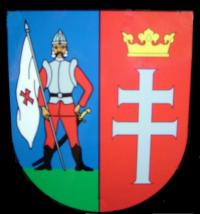
- Coat of arms

- Location of Somogy county in Hungary

- Location of Szabás
- Coordinates: 46.28810°N 17.44648°E
- Country: Hungary
- Region: Southern Transdanubia
- County: Somogy
- District: Nagyatád
- RC Diocese: Kaposvár

Area
  - Total: 18.11 km^{2} (6.99 sq mi)

Population (2017)
  - Total: 601
  - Density: 33.2/km^{2} (86.0/sq mi)
- Demonym: szabási
- Time zone: UTC+1 (CET)
  - Summer (DST): UTC+2 (CEST)
- Postal code: 7544
- Area code: (+36) 82
- NUTS 3 code: HU232
- MP: László Szászfalvi (KDNP)
- Website: Szabás Online

Szabás is a village in Somogy county, Hungary.

== History ==
According to László Szita the settlement was completely Hungarian in the 18th century.
