= Nagyatád District =

Coordinates: 46.228116384552244°N 17.36291833009819°E

Nagyatád District Nagyatádi járás
- Districts of Hungary
- Coat of arms

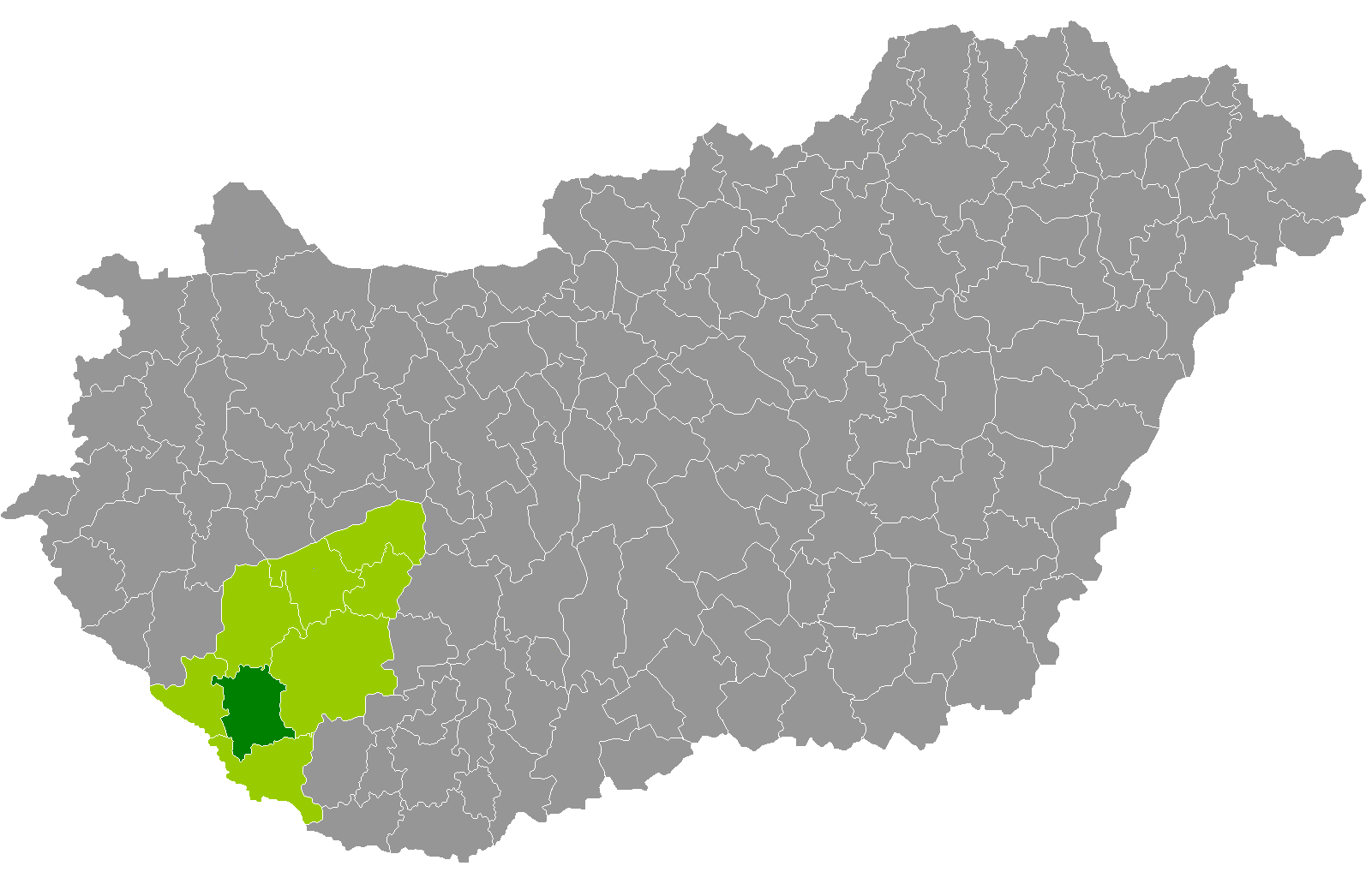
- Nagyatád District within Hungary and Somogy County.
- Country: Hungary
- Region: Southern Transdanubia
- County: Somogy
- District seat: Nagyatád

Area
  - Total: 647.07 km^{2} (249.84 sq mi)
  - Rank: 5th in Somogy

Population (2011 census)
  - Total: 26,003
  - Rank: 5th in Somogy
  - Density: 40/km^{2} (100/sq mi)

Nagyatád (Hungarian: Nagyatádi járás) is a district in central-southern part of Somogy County, in Hungary. Nagyatád is also the name of the town where the district seat is found. The district is located in the Southern Transdanubia Statistical Region.

== Geography ==
Nagyatád District borders with Marcali District to the north, Kaposvár District to the east, Barcs District to the south, Csurgó District to the west. The number of the inhabited places in Nagyatád District is 18.

== Municipalities ==
The district has 1 town and 17 villages. (ordered by population, as of 1 January 2013)

- Bakháza (191)
- Beleg (592)
- Bolhás (436)
- Görgeteg (1,111)
- Háromfa (788)
- Kaszó (110)
- Kisbajom (417)
- Kutas (1,456)
- Lábod (2,048)
- **Nagyatád** (10,921) – district seat
- Nagykorpád (608)
- Ötvöskónyi (925)
- Rinyabesenyő (209)
- Rinyaszentkirály (394)
- Segesd (2,528)
- Somogyszob (1,586)
- Szabás (597)
- Tarany (1,183)

The bolded municipality is city.

== See also ==
- List of cities and towns in Hungary
