= Görgeteg =

Görgeteg Grgetka (in Croatian)
- Village
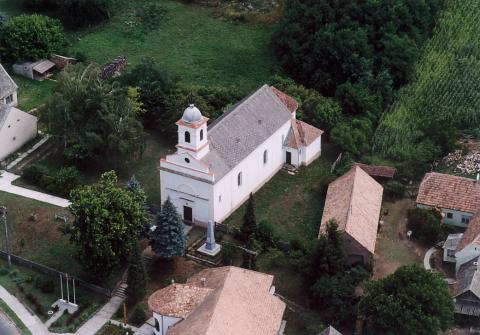
- Nagyboldogasszony-templom (English: Assumption of Mary Church) in Görgeteg

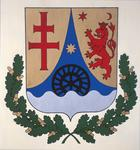
- Coat of arms

- Location of Somogy county in Hungary

- Location of Görgeteg
- Coordinates: 46.14728°N 17.44481°E
- Country: Hungary
- Region: Southern Transdanubia
- County: Somogy
- District: Nagyatád
- RC Diocese: Kaposvár

Area
  - Total: 33.5 km^{2} (12.9 sq mi)

Population (2024)
  - Total: 1,019
  - Density: 30.4/km^{2} (78.8/sq mi)
- Demonym: görgetegi
- Time zone: UTC+1 (CET)
  - Summer (DST): UTC+2 (CEST)
- Postal code: 7553
- Area code: (+36) 82
- NUTS 3 code: HU232
- MP: László Szászfalvi (KDNP)
- Website: Görgeteg Online

Görgeteg (Croatian: Grgetka) is a village in Somogy county, Hungary.

== History ==
According to László Szita the settlement was completely Hungarian in the 18th century.
