= Rheem, San Pablo, California =

Rheem
- Former unincorporated community District of San Pablo
- Location in California
- Coordinates: 37°58′33″N 122°21′16″W
- Country: United States
- State: California
- County: Contra Costa County
- City: San Pablo
- Elevation: 26 ft (8 m)

Rheem is a former unincorporated community now annexed to San Pablo in Contra Costa County, California. It lies on the BNSF Railway 2.5 miles (4.0 km) north-northwest of downtown Richmond, an elevation of 26 feet (8 m).
