= Barnag =

- Flag Coat of arms

- Location of Veszprém county in Hungary

- Location of Barnag
- Coordinates: 46.98040°N 17.74855°E
- Country: Hungary
- County: Veszprém

Area
  - Total: 12.01 km^{2} (4.64 sq mi)

Population (2004)
  - Total: 110
  - Density: 9.15/km^{2} (23.7/sq mi)
- Time zone: UTC+1 (CET)
  - Summer (DST): UTC+2 (CEST)
- Postal code: 8291
- Area code: 88

Barnag is a village in Veszprém county, Hungary.
