= Beleg, Hungary =

Beleg
- Village
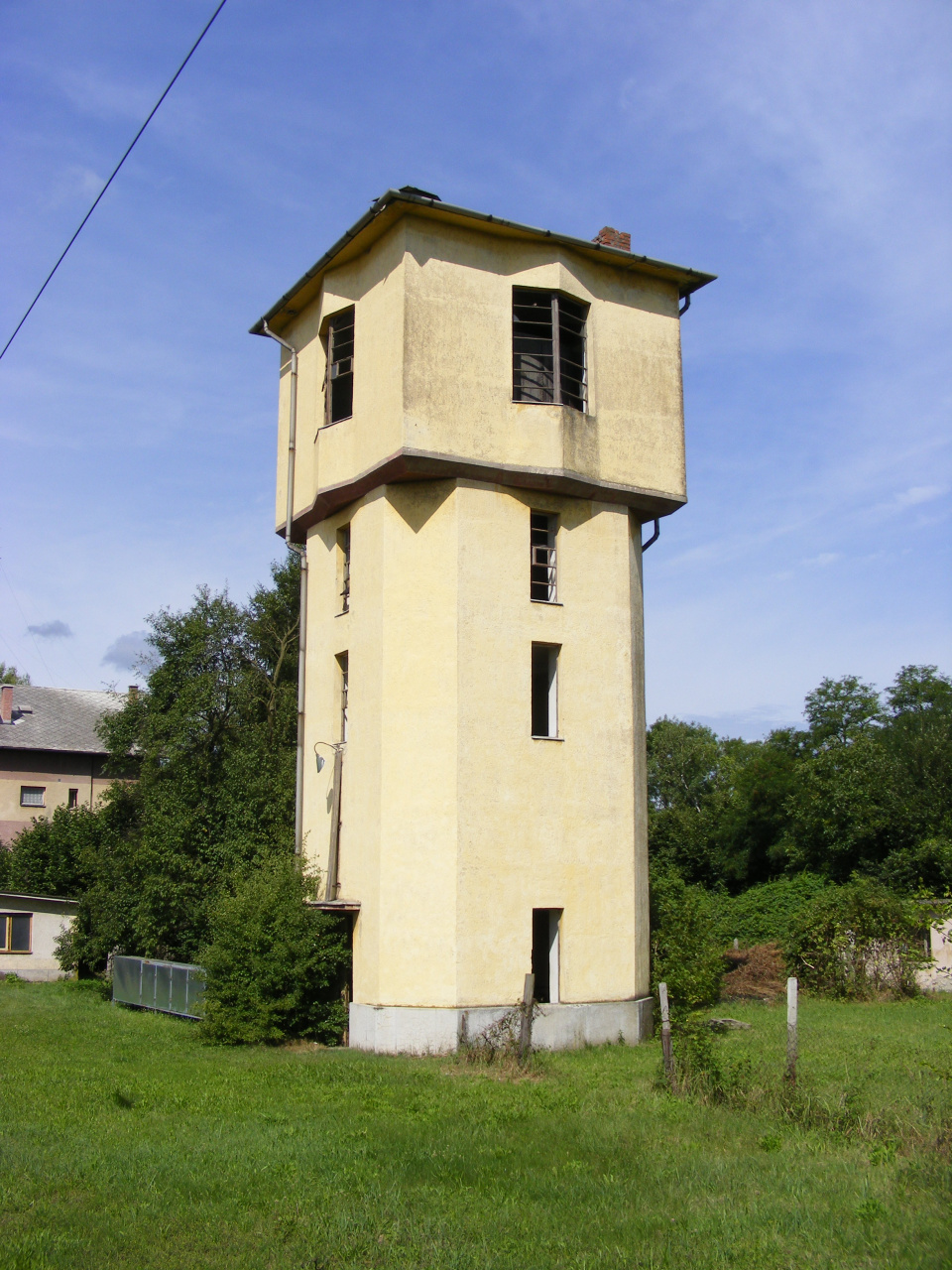
- Water house of the railway station in Beleg

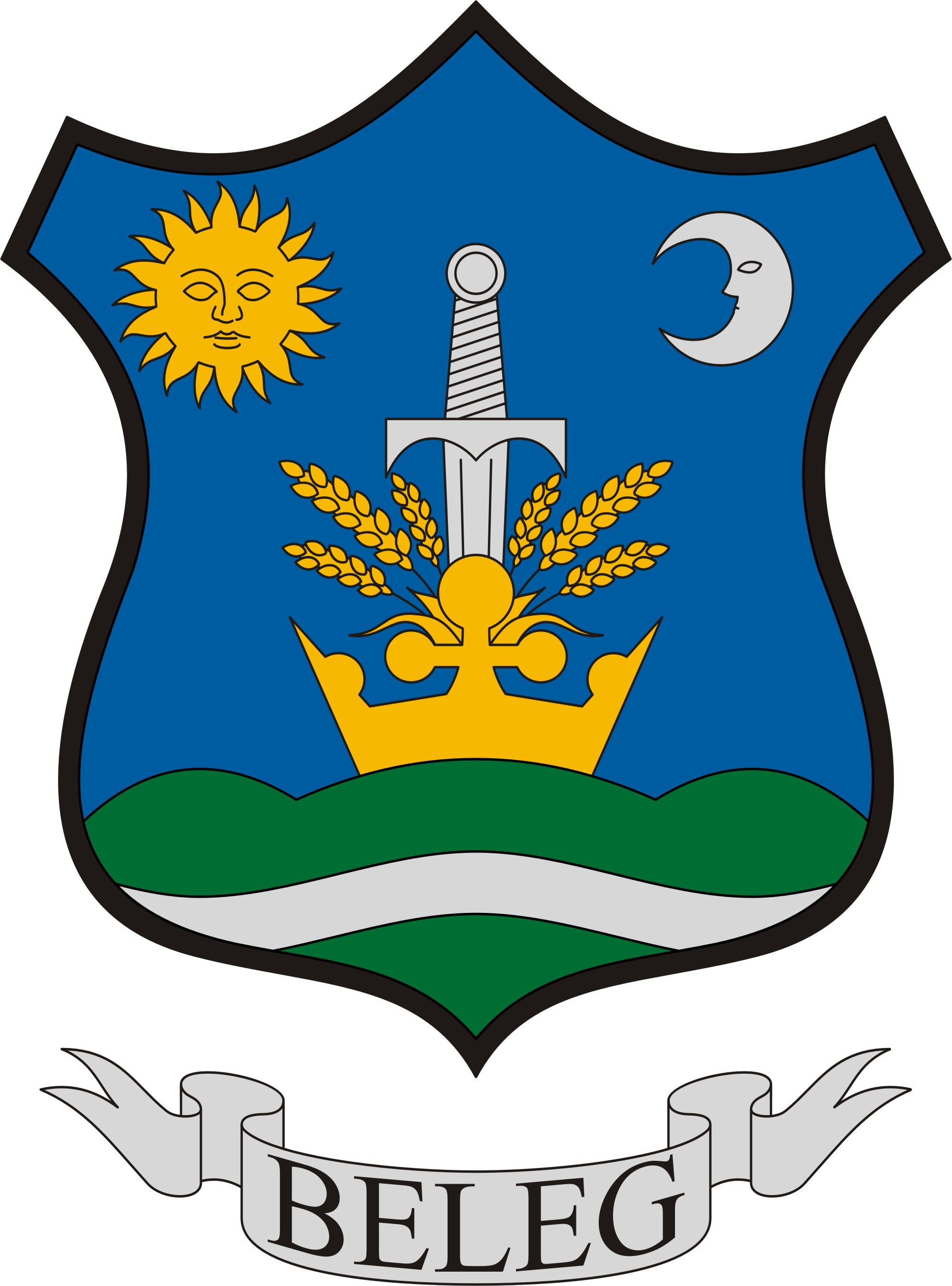
- Coat of arms

- Location of Beleg, Hungary
- Coordinates: 46.31596°N 17.41058°E
- Country: Hungary
- Region: Southern Transdanubia
- County: Somogy
- District: Nagyatád
- RC Diocese: Kaposvár

Area
  - Total: 17.99 km^{2} (6.95 sq mi)

Population (2017)
  - Total: 597
  - Density: 33.2/km^{2} (85.9/sq mi)
- Demonym: belegi
- Time zone: UTC+1 (CET)
  - Summer (DST): UTC+2 (CEST)
- Postal code: 7543
- Area code: (+36) 82
- NUTS 3 code: HU232
- MP: László Szászfalvi (KDNP)
- Website: Beleg Online

Beleg is a village in Somogy county, Hungary.

== Etymology ==
Its name derives from the given name Biluk. He could be the owner of the village.

== History ==
According to László Szita the settlement was completely Hungarian in the 18th century.
