= Rheem Creek =

Stream in the U.S. state of California

Rheem Creek is a 3-mile-long (4.8 km) urban stream in western Contra Costa County, California, which empties into San Pablo Bay south of Point Pinole. The creek rises from Rolling Hills Cemetery and passes through Rollingwood, the campus of Contra Costa Community College, and the city of San Pablo, California. Near this area at the end of the creek a business park is being built and there has been some concern on how the creek may be impacted by the construction. The waterway is named after the early 20th-century local figure William Rheem.

== See also ==
- List of watercourses in the San Francisco Bay Area
