= Nagykorpád =

- Village
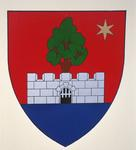
- Coat of arms

- Location of Somogy county in Hungary

- Location of Nagykorpád
- Coordinates: 46.25973°N 17.45706°E
- Country: Hungary
- Region: Southern Transdanubia
- County: Somogy
- District: Nagyatád
- RC Diocese: Kaposvár

Area
  - Total: 33.42 km^{2} (12.90 sq mi)

Population (2017)
  - Total: 573
  - Density: 17.1/km^{2} (44.4/sq mi)
- Demonym(s): korpádi, nagykorpádi
- Time zone: UTC+1 (CET)
  - Summer (DST): UTC+2 (CEST)
- Postal code: 7545
- Area code: (+36) 82
- NUTS 3 code: HU232
- MP: László Szászfalvi (KDNP)
- Website: Nagykorpád Online

Nagykorpád is a village in Somogy county, Hungary.

== History ==
According to László Szita the settlement was completely Hungarian in the 18th century.
