= Ötvöskónyi =

Ötvöskónyi Otoš / Kunja (in Croatian)
- Village
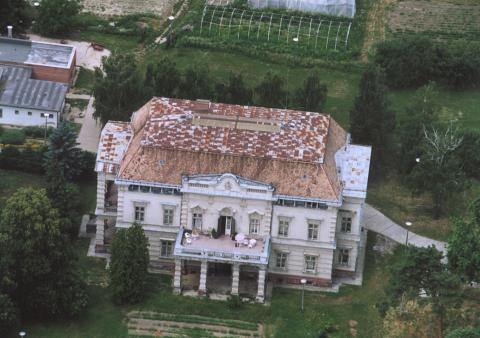
- Czindery Mansion

- Coat of arms

- Location of Somogy county in Hungary

- Location of Ötvöskónyi
- Coordinates: 46.28778°N 17.36051°E
- Country: Hungary
- Region: Southern Transdanubia
- County: Somogy
- District: Nagyatád
- RC Diocese: Kaposvár

Area
  - Total: 27.71 km^{2} (10.70 sq mi)

Population (2017)
  - Total: 924
  - Density: 33.3/km^{2} (86.4/sq mi)
- Demonym(s): kónyi, ötvöskónyi
- Time zone: UTC+1 (CET)
  - Summer (DST): UTC+2 (CEST)
- Postal code: 7511
- Area code: (+36) 82
- NUTS 3 code: HU232
- MP: László Szászfalvi (KDNP)
- Website: Ötvöskónyi Online

Ötvöskónyi (Croatian: Otoš / Kunja) is a village in Somogy county, Hungary.
