= Bozzai =

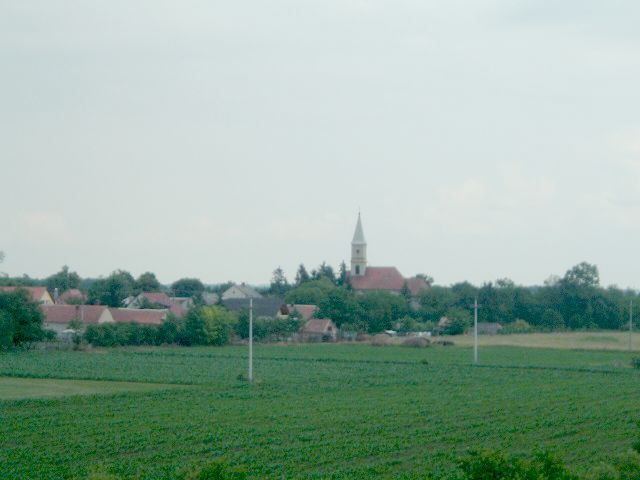
- Bozzai

- Flag Coat of arms

- Location of Vas county in Hungary

- Location of Bozzai
- Coordinates: 47.20822°N 16.76463°E
- Country: Hungary
- County: Vas

Area
  - Total: 4.43 km^{2} (1.71 sq mi)

Population (2004)
  - Total: 318
  - Density: 71.78/km^{2} (185.9/sq mi)
- Time zone: UTC+1 (CET)
  - Summer (DST): UTC+2 (CEST)
- Postal code: 9752
- Area code: 94

Bozzai is a village in Vas County in western Hungary, 10 km east of Szombathely.
