= Boncodfölde =

Coordinates: 46°52′N 16°44′E

- Village
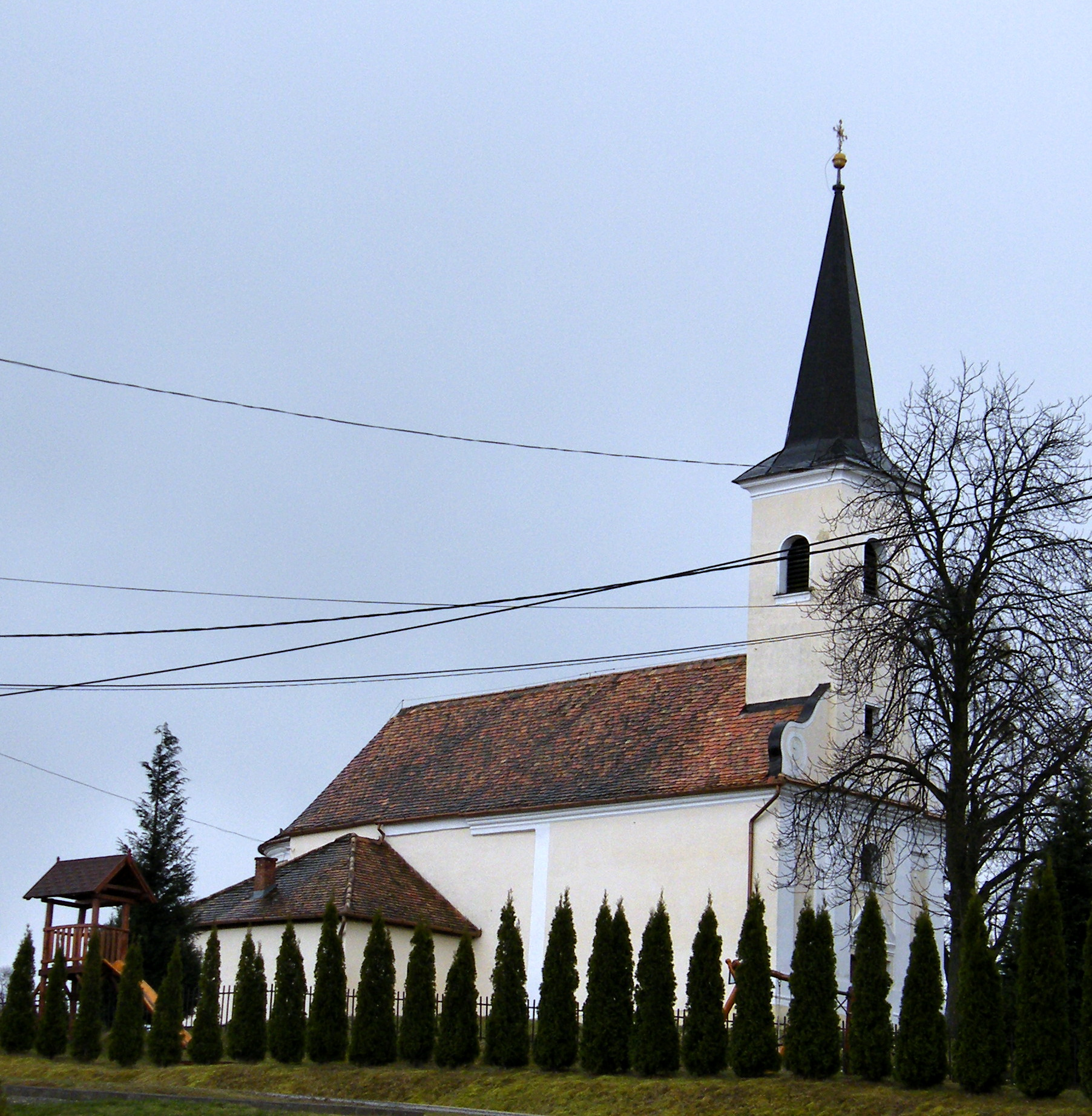
- Interactive map of Boncodfölde
- Country: Hungary
- Region: Western Transdanubia
- County: Zala County
- Time zone: UTC+1 (CET)
  - Summer (DST): UTC+2 (CEST)

Boncodfölde is a village in Zala County, Hungary. It is 12km west of the county seat Zalaegerszeg.

The Catholic church of Saint Anne dates from the 13th century and was renovated in the 18th century.
