= Rheam =

Rheam is a surname. Notable people with the surname include:

- Cy Rheam (1893–1947), American baseball player
- Henry Meynell Rheam (1859–1920), English painter

== See also ==
- Leonta Rheams (born 1976), American footballer
- Rheem (disambiguation)
