= Rheem, California =

Unincorporated community in California, United States

Rheem
- Unincorporated community
- Location in California
- Coordinates: 37°51′39″N 122°07′38″W
- Country: United States
- State: California
- County: Contra Costa
- Elevation: 587 ft (179 m)
- GNIS ID: 1659504

Rheem, also known as Rheem Valley and Rheem Center, is an unincorporated community in Contra Costa County, California, United States. It is located 7.5 miles (12 km) north-northwest of Danville, at an elevation of 587 feet (179 m). It was incorporated into the town of Moraga when that town was incorporated in 1974.

The place was named after its developer, Donald Laird Rheem, one of the founders of Rheem Manufacturing Company and the son of William Rheem, President of Standard Oil Company.
