= Kaszó =

- Village
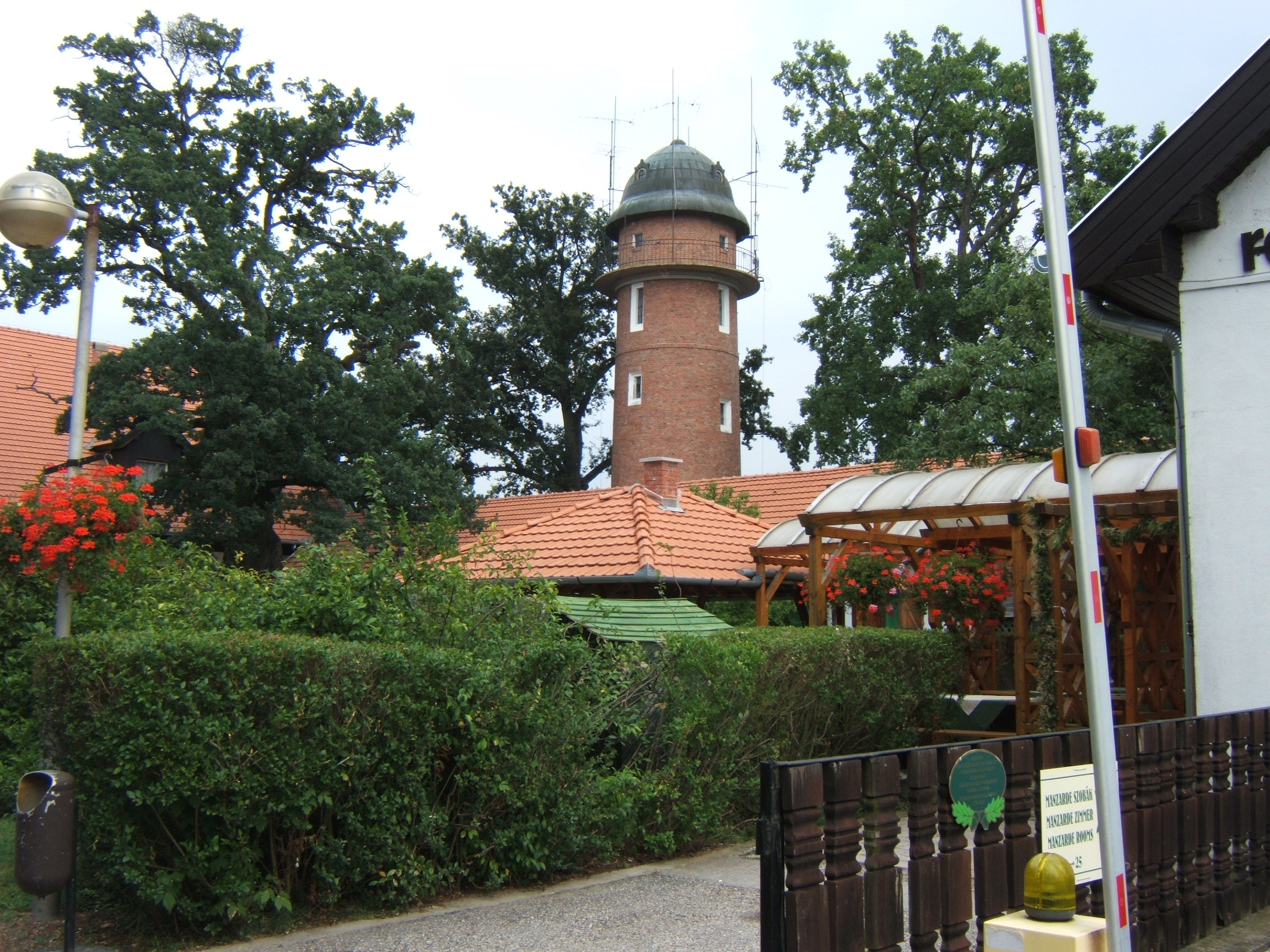
- The tower of Kaszó

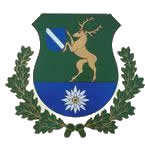
- Coat of arms

- Location of Somogy county in Hungary

- Location of Kaszó
- Coordinates: 46.31951°N 17.22186°E
- Country: Hungary
- Region: Southern Transdanubia
- County: Somogy
- District: Nagyatád
- RC Diocese: Kaposvár

Area
  - Total: 22.48 km^{2} (8.68 sq mi)

Population (2024)
  - Total: 83
  - Density: 3.7/km^{2} (9.6/sq mi)
- Demonym: kaszói
- Time zone: UTC+1 (CET)
  - Summer (DST): UTC+2 (CEST)
- Postal code: 7564
- Area code: (+36) 82
- NUTS 3 code: HU232
- MP: László Szászfalvi (KDNP)

Kaszó is a village in Somogy county, Hungary. It was first mentioned in 1398. The village is popular with hunters, due to wildlife in the surrounding areas.

A small church stands in Darvaspuszta, an area belonging to Kaszó.
