= Bazsi =

- Coat of arms

- Location of Bazsi in Hungary
- Coordinates: 46.9326°N 17.2469°E
- Country: Hungary
- Region: Central Transdanubia
- County: Veszprém

Area
  - Total: 9.10 km^{2} (3.51 sq mi)

Population (2012)
  - Total: 388
  - Density: 42.6/km^{2} (110/sq mi)
- Time zone: UTC+1 (CET)
  - Summer (DST): UTC+2 (CEST)
- Postal code: 8352
- Area code: +36 87
- Website: http://bazsi.hu/

Bazsi is a village in Veszprém county, Hungary.
