= Bakháza =

Bakháza Bokasovo (in Croatian)
- Village
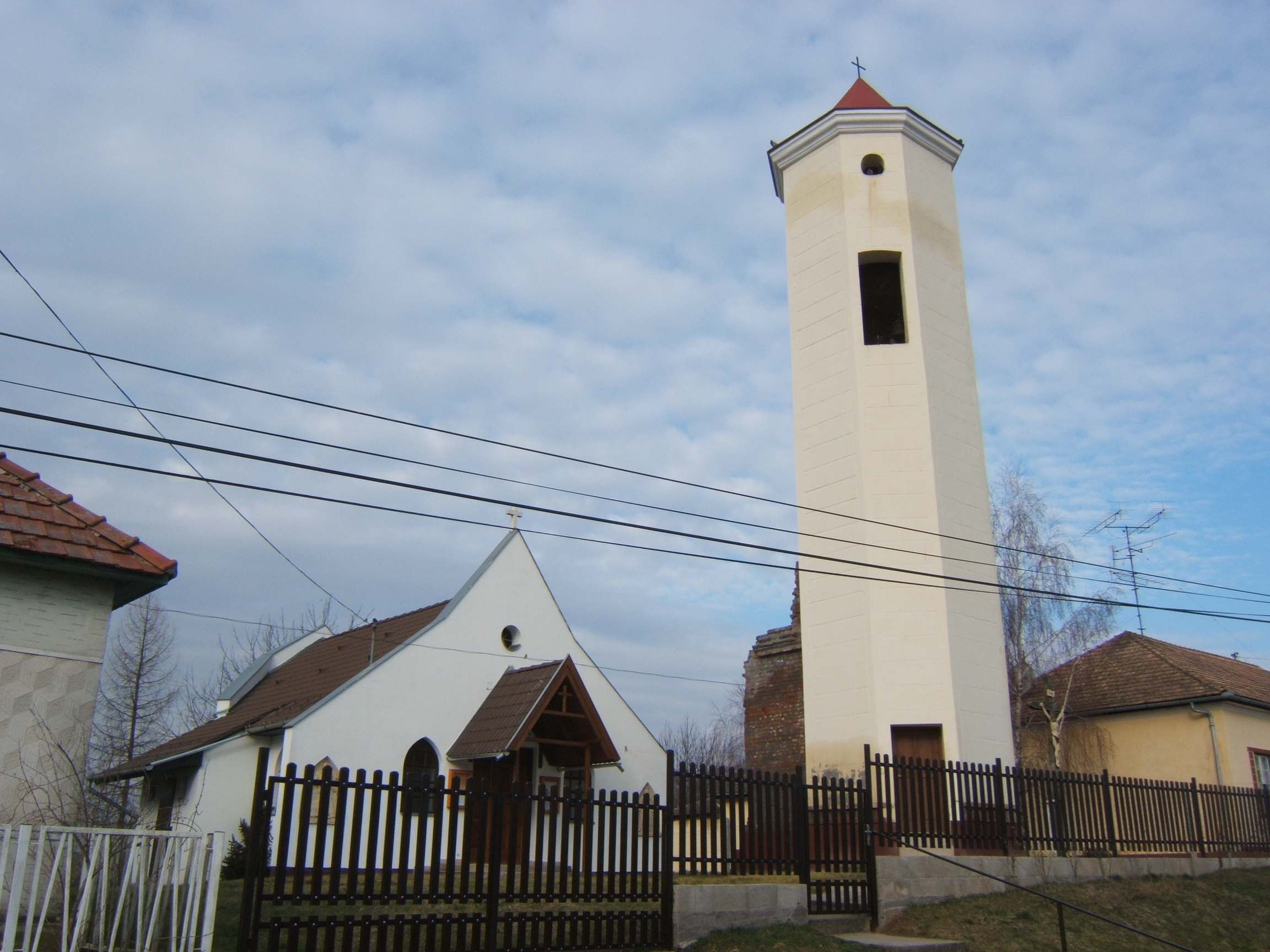
- Church of Bakháza

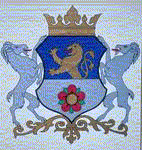
- Coat of arms

- Location of Bakháza
- Coordinates: 46.10599°N 17.36019°E
- Country: Hungary
- Region: Southern Transdanubia
- County: Somogy
- District: Nagyatád
- RC Diocese: Kaposvár

Area
  - Total: 5.92 km^{2} (2.29 sq mi)

Population (2017)
  - Total: 173
  - Density: 29.2/km^{2} (75.7/sq mi)
- Demonym(s): bakházi, bakházai
- Time zone: UTC+1 (CET)
  - Summer (DST): UTC+2 (CEST)
- Postal code: 7585
- Area code: (+36) 82
- NUTS 3 code: HU232
- MP: László Szászfalvi (KDNP)

Bakháza (Croatian: Bokasovo) is a village in Somogy county, Hungary. It has an area of 5,92km², and in 2019 it was estimated to have 184 inhabitants.
