= Börzönce =

Coordinates: 46°35′N 16°54′E

- Village
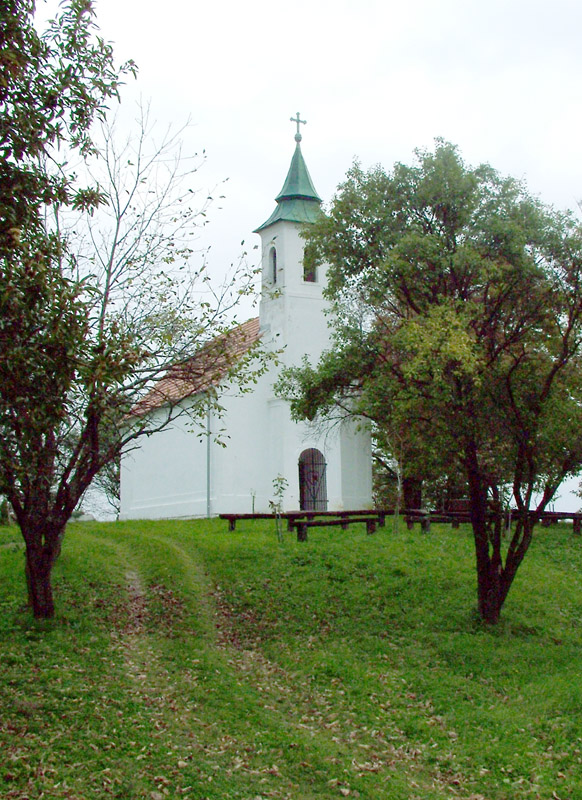
- Börzönce Szent Lőrinc kápolna
- Interactive map of Börzönce
- Country: Hungary
- Region: Western Transdanubia
- County: Zala County
- Time zone: UTC+1 (CET)
  - Summer (DST): UTC+2 (CEST)

Börzönce is a village in Zala County, Hungary.
