= Bolhás =

- Village
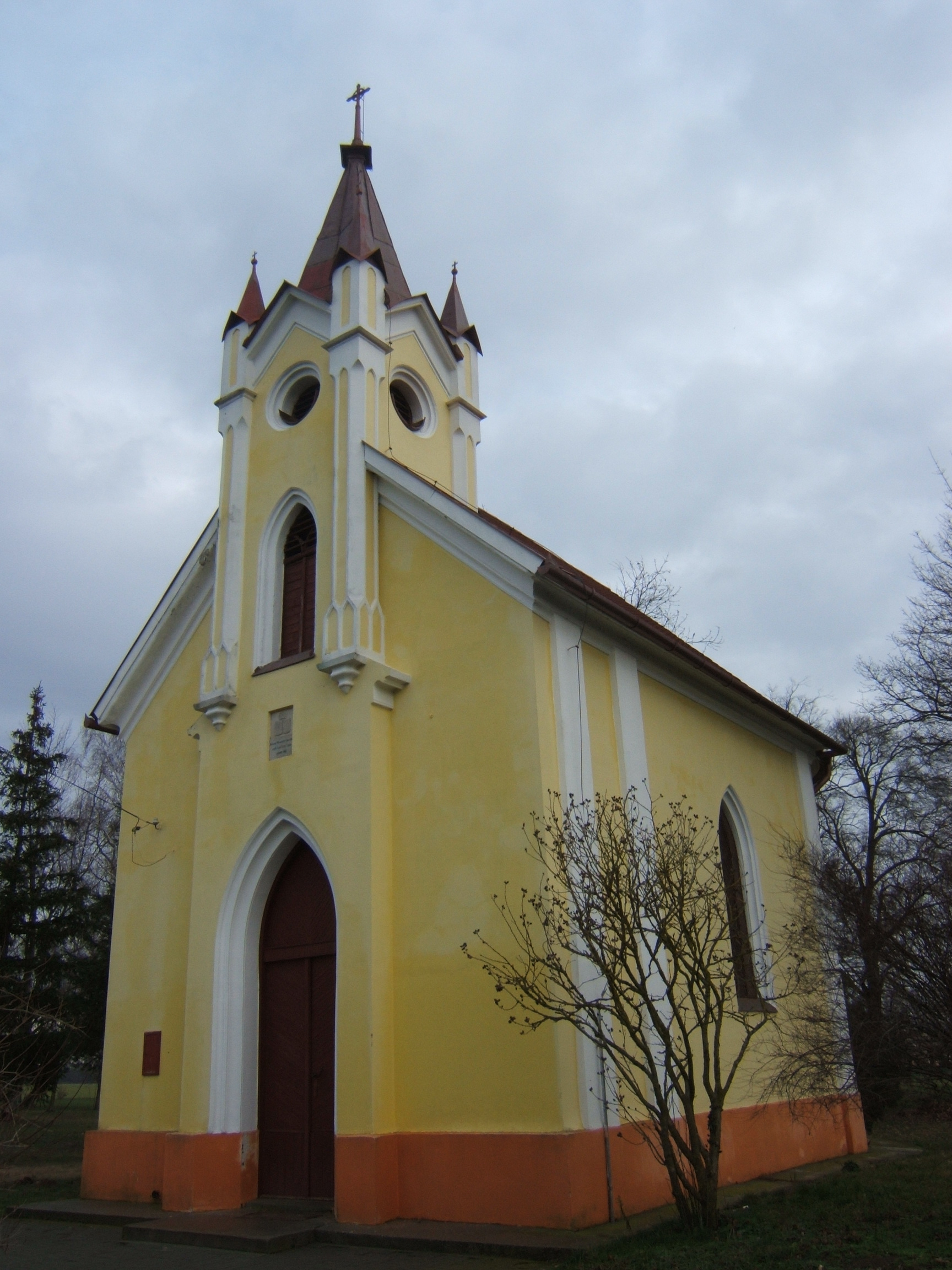
- Chapel of Bolhás

- Coat of arms

- Location of Somogy county in Hungary

- Location of Bolhás
- Coordinates: 46.26974°N 17.27011°E
- Country: Hungary
- Region: Southern Transdanubia
- County: Somogy
- District: Nagyatád
- RC Diocese: Kaposvár

Area
  - Total: 31.43 km^{2} (12.14 sq mi)

Population (2024)
  - Total: 378
  - Density: 12.0/km^{2} (31.1/sq mi)
- Demonym: bolhási
- Time zone: UTC+1 (CET)
  - Summer (DST): UTC+2 (CEST)
- Postal code: 7517
- Area code: (+36) 82
- NUTS 3 code: HU232
- MP: László Szászfalvi (KDNP)

Bolhás is a village in Somogy county, Hungary.

== Etymology ==
Its name derives from the Hungarian word bolha (English: flea). According to the legends the village belonged to a knight who was called Bolha.

== Culture ==
The Hungarian folk songs Megismerni a kanászt and Volt nekem egy kecském were collected in 1922 in Bolhás by Zoltán Kodály.
