= Bögöt =

Village in Vas, Hungary

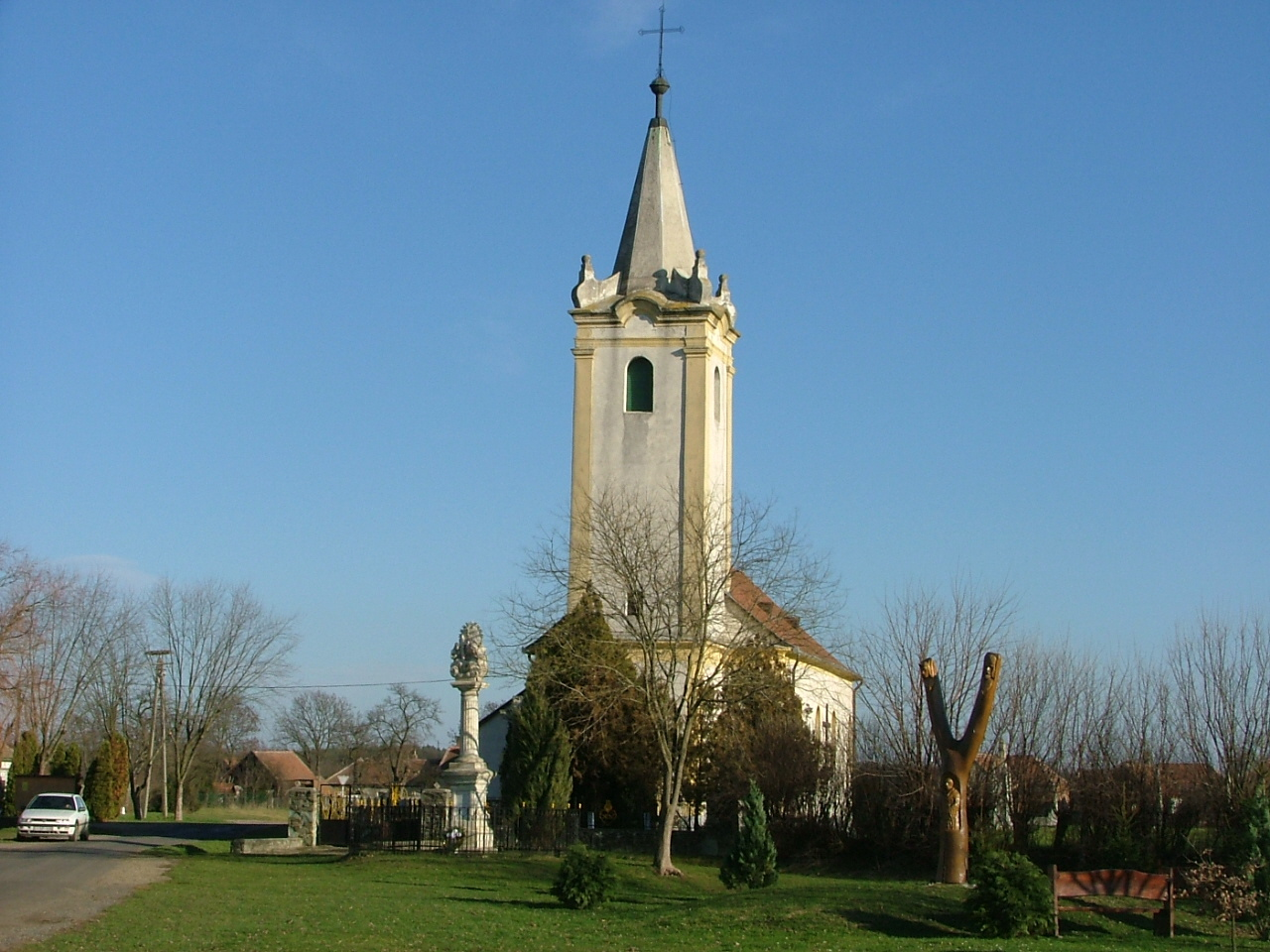

- Flag Seal

- Location of Vas county in Hungary

- Location of Bögöt
- Coordinates: 47.25353°N 16.82906°E
- Country: Hungary
- County: Vas

Government
  - Mayor: Hencsei Tamás (Ind.)

Area
  - Total: 4.99 km^{2} (1.93 sq mi)

Population (2022)
  - Total: 386
  - Density: 77.4/km^{2} (200/sq mi)
- Time zone: UTC+1 (CET)
  - Summer (DST): UTC+2 (CEST)
- Postal code: 9612
- Area code: 95
- Motorways: M86
- Distance from Budapest: 205 km (127 mi) East

Bögöt is a village in Vas County, Hungary.
