= Bocska =

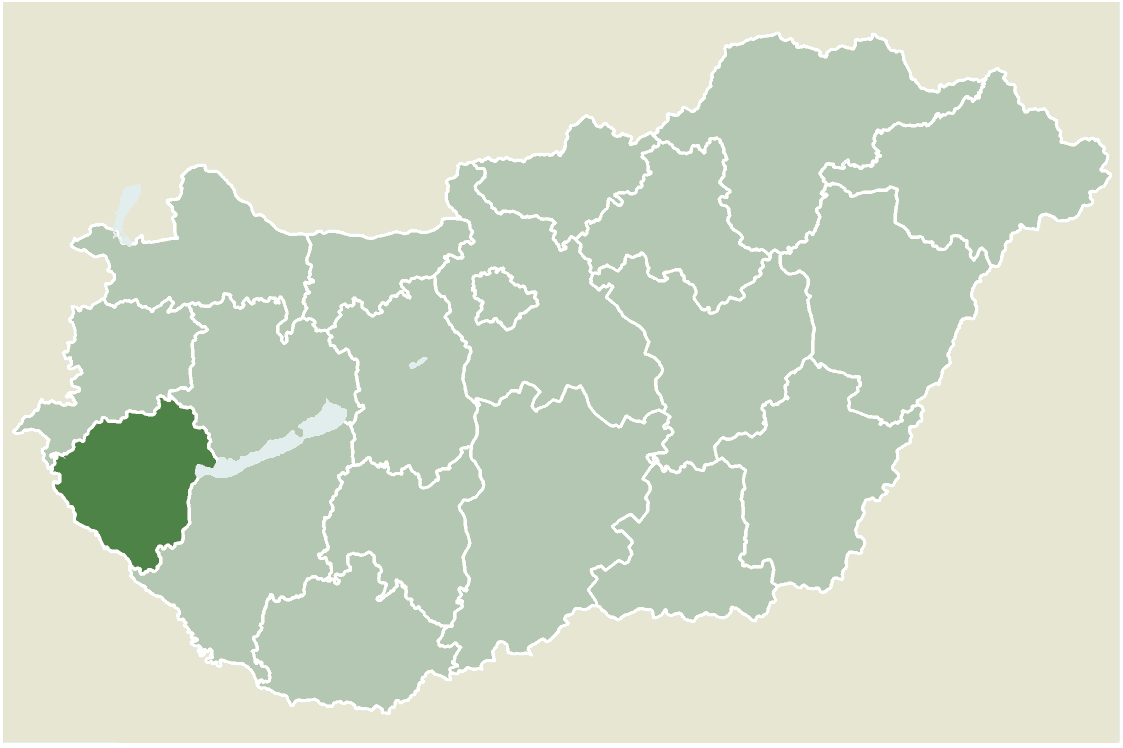
- Location of Zala county in Hungary

- Location of Bocska
- Coordinates: 46.55683°N 16.90853°E
- Country: Hungary
- County: Zala

Area
  - Total: 7.38 km^{2} (2.85 sq mi)

Population (2004)
  - Total: 378
  - Density: 51.21/km^{2} (132.6/sq mi)
- Time zone: UTC+1 (CET)
  - Summer (DST): UTC+2 (CEST)
- Postal code: 8776
- Area code: 93

Bocska is a village in Zala County, Hungary.
