= Bodorfa =

- Location of Bodorfa in Hungary
- Coordinates: 47.0764°N 17.3427°E
- Country: Hungary
- Region: Central Transdanubia
- County: Veszprém

Area
  - Total: 2.22 km^{2} (0.86 sq mi)

Population (2012)
  - Total: 107
  - Density: 48.2/km^{2} (125/sq mi)
- Time zone: UTC+1 (CET)
  - Summer (DST): UTC+2 (CEST)
- Postal code: 8471
- Area code: +36 87
- Website: http://www.bodorfa.hu/

Bodorfa is a village in Veszprém county, Hungary.
