= Kisbajom =

- Village
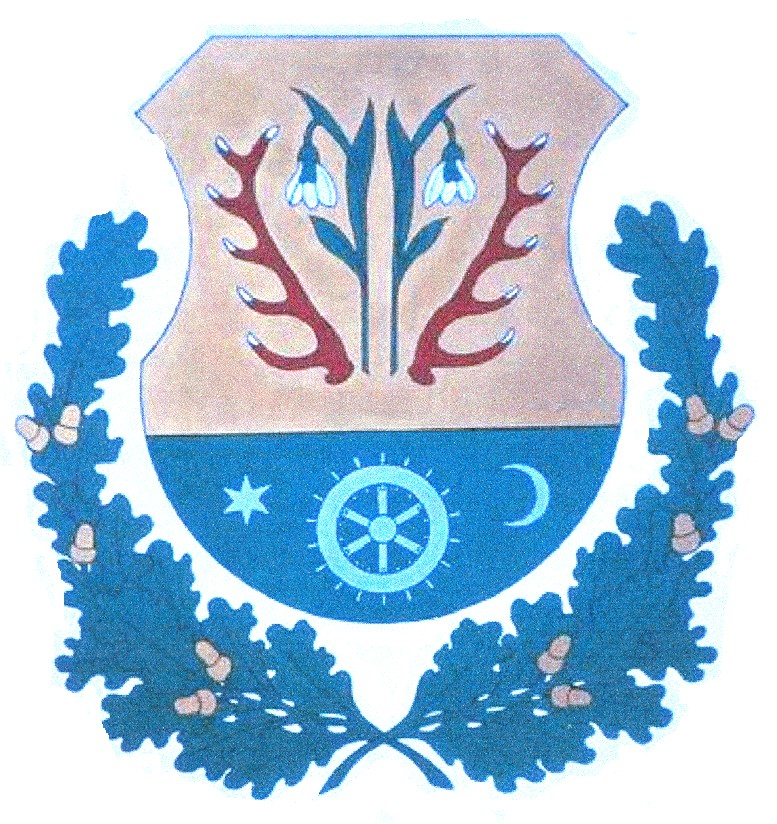
- Coat of arms

- Location of Somogy county in Hungary

- Location of Kisbajom
- Coordinates: 46.30455°N 17.49045°E
- Country: Hungary
- Region: Southern Transdanubia
- County: Somogy
- District: Nagyatád
- RC Diocese: Kaposvár

Area
  - Total: 13.67 km^{2} (5.28 sq mi)

Population (2017)
  - Total: 388
  - Density: 28.4/km^{2} (73.5/sq mi)
- Demonym: kisbajomi
- Time zone: UTC+1 (CET)
  - Summer (DST): UTC+2 (CEST)
- Postal code: 7542
- Area code: (+36) 82
- NUTS 3 code: HU232
- MP: László Szászfalvi (KDNP)

Kisbajom is a village in Somogy county, Hungary. The village can be found in a forest area at the end of a dead end road.

The name of the village literally translated means My Small Problem (Kis+baj+om). However, like nearby Nagybajom ("My Large Problem"), the name derives from the Árpád-era name Baj or Baján, meaning rich.

== History ==
According to László Szita the settlement was completely Hungarian in the 18th century.

== Demographics ==
In 2001 there were 455 inhabitants in Kisbajom. At the end of the nineteenth century (1870) Kisbajom counted 957 people. Slowly the numbers decreased to 891 in 1959 and 563 in 1980. In the beginning of the nineties there were 494 registered inhabitants. 92 of those were registered as ethnic Roma. In 1992 37% of the people were employed, 34% unemployed and 30% child or pensioned. (source: Kisbajom falufelmérés, PMMF urbanisztika szak, 1993)

Since 2010 the municipality, with assistance from European funds, has built a holiday house, camping facilities, a large old style oven, bought bikes and horse carriages. These facilities are all localized around the old clergy house and partially inside a small open air museum, all in the middle of the village. There is also a nature trail for hikers, which starts and finishes here.
