= Búcsúszentlászló =

Coordinates: 46°47′N 16°56′E

- Village
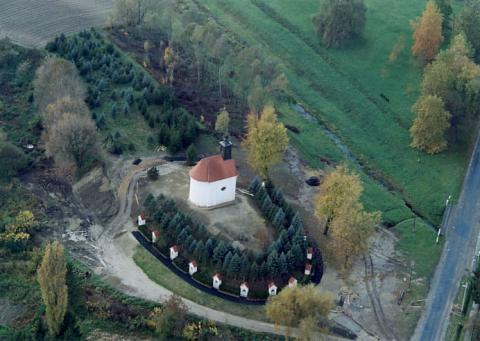
- Búcsúszentlászló1
- Interactive map of Búcsúszentlászló
- Country: Hungary
- Region: Western Transdanubia
- County: Zala County
- Time zone: UTC+1 (CET)
  - Summer (DST): UTC+2 (CEST)

Búcsúszentlászló is a village in Zala County, Hungary. It is located 24km West of Lake Balaton, the largest lake in Central Europe.
