= Batyk =

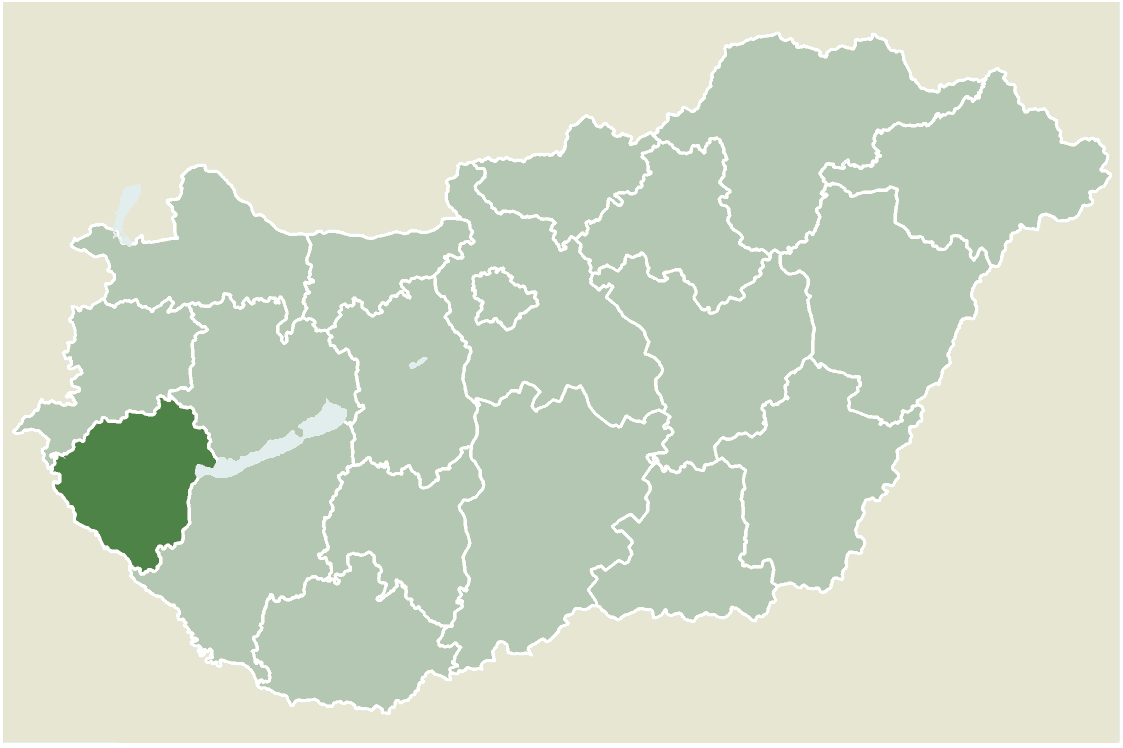
- Location of Zala county in Hungary

- Location of Batyk
- Coordinates: 46.99085°N 17.03592°E
- Country: Hungary
- County: Zala

Area
  - Total: 8.09 km^{2} (3.12 sq mi)

Population (2004)
  - Total: 409
  - Density: 50.55/km^{2} (130.9/sq mi)
- Time zone: UTC+1 (CET)
  - Summer (DST): UTC+2 (CEST)
- Postal code: 8797
- Area code: 83

Batyk is a village in Zala County, Hungary.
