= Bakonyszentiván =

- Flag Coat of arms

- Location of Veszprém county in Hungary

- Location of Bakonyszentiván
- Coordinates: 47.39002°N 17.67062°E
- Country: Hungary
- County: Veszprém

Area
  - Total: 9.14 km^{2} (3.53 sq mi)

Population (2004)
  - Total: 256
  - Density: 28/km^{2} (73/sq mi)
- Time zone: UTC+1 (CET)
  - Summer (DST): UTC+2 (CEST)
- Postal code: 8557
- Area code: 89

Bakonyszentiván is a village in Veszprém county, Hungary.
