= Bakonypölöske =

Bakonypölöske Peretschke
- Location of Veszprém county in Hungary

- Location of Bakonypölöske
- Coordinates: 47.21195°N 17.48704°E
- Country: Hungary
- County: Veszprém

Area
  - Total: 11.04 km^{2} (4.26 sq mi)

Population (2004)
  - Total: 411
  - Density: 37.22/km^{2} (96.4/sq mi)
- Time zone: UTC+1 (CET)
  - Summer (DST): UTC+2 (CEST)
- Postal code: 8457
- Area code: 88

Bakonypölöske (German: Peretschke) is a village in Veszprém County, Hungary.
