= William Rheem =

American businessman

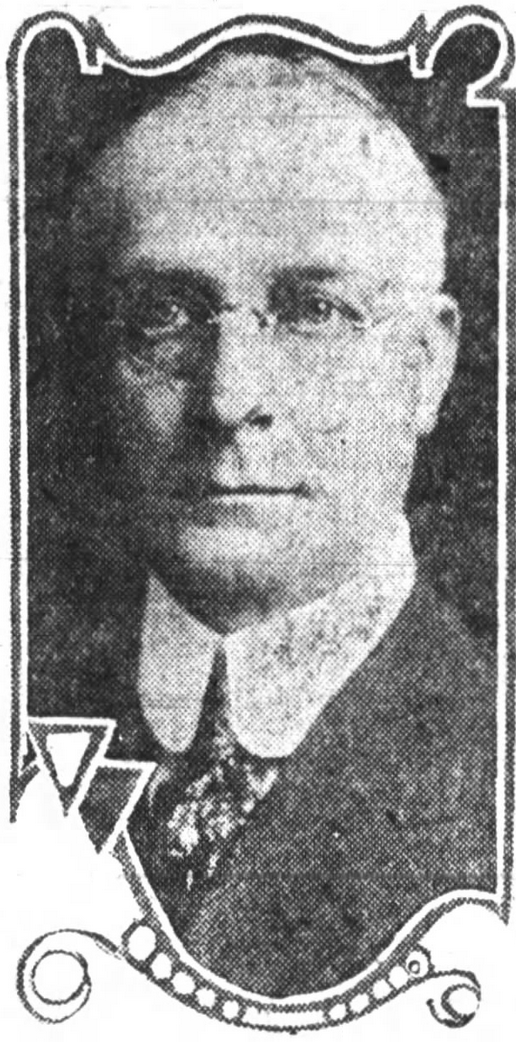
- Born: 1862; Minnesota, United States
- Died: April 19, 1919 (aged 56–57); Santa Cruz, California
- Occupation: Businessman
- Employer: Standard Oil

William S. Rheem (1862 – April 19, 1919), a.k.a. W.S. Rheem, was an important civic figure in the politics of early Richmond, California, in addition to being president of the Standard Oil Company of California (today's Chevron Corporation) from 1917 until his death.

== Overview ==
Rheem was born in Minnesota and raised in Pennsylvania. At age 23, he became a chemist for Standard Oil in Franklin, Pennsylvania. He later led the construction efforts for a Standard Oil refinery in Whiting, Indiana. In 1900, Standard Oil acquired the Pacific Coast Oil Company of California. Rheem was dispatched to Alameda, California to manage their refinery.

In October 1901, Rheem arrived in Point Richmond (then called East Yards) after finding a spot for a new refinery to replace the Alameda facility. He chose a spot in the Point Richmond District along the Potrero Hills and the Marshlands. A colossal facility was built at this site employing thousands and drastically transforming a farming community of a few hundred into a company town of several thousand. As the installations were completed, Rheem remained with the company as the superintendent of the Richmond Refinery. Rheem became first vice president of Pacific Coast Oil in 1914. In 1917, he was elected president of the company, then called Standard Oil Company of California. He replaced the company's first president D. G. Scofield, who committed suicide.

On April 19, 1919, Rheem died of a heart attack en route to Santa Cruz during a family outing.

== Legacy ==
Rheem Creek, a small river in the Hilltop District and Rheem Avenue a street in the Central Richmond District are named in his honor.

== Personal life ==
Two of Rheem's sons, Donald and Richard, founded what is now Rheem Manufacturing Company, in 1925. Another son, William K., and grandson William S. Rheem II, played smaller roles in the company.
