= Bakonykoppány =

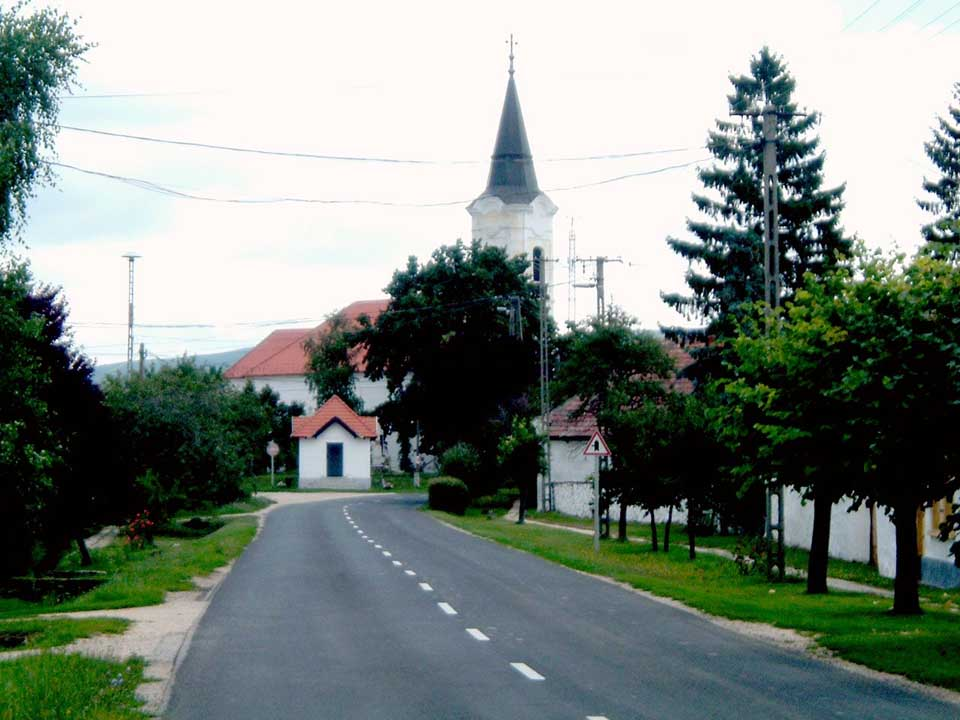

- Flag Coat of arms

- Location of Veszprém county in Hungary

- Location of Bakonykoppány
- Coordinates: 47.33066°N 17.68628°E
- Country: Hungary
- County: Veszprém

Area
  - Total: 6.83 km^{2} (2.64 sq mi)

Population (2004)
  - Total: 225
  - Density: 32.94/km^{2} (85.3/sq mi)
- Time zone: UTC+1 (CET)
  - Summer (DST): UTC+2 (CEST)
- Postal code: 8571
- Area code: 89

Bakonykoppány is a village in Veszprém county, Hungary.
