= Bakonyszücs =

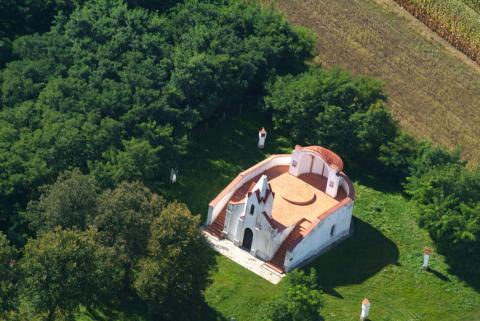

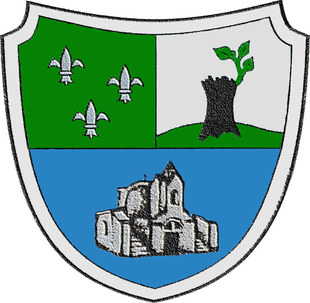
- Coat of arms

- Location of Veszprém county in Hungary

- Location of Bakonyszücs
- Coordinates: 47.3333333°N 17.6833333°E
- Country: Hungary
- County: Veszprém

Area
  - Total: 35.21 km^{2} (13.59 sq mi)

Population (2004)
  - Total: 365
  - Density: 10.36/km^{2} (26.8/sq mi)
- Time zone: UTC+1 (CET)
  - Summer (DST): UTC+2 (CEST)
- Postal code: 8572
- Area code: 89

Bakonyszücs (Hungarian pronunciation: [ˈbɒkoɲsyt͡ʃ]) is a village in Veszprém county, Hungary.
