= Bakonyság =

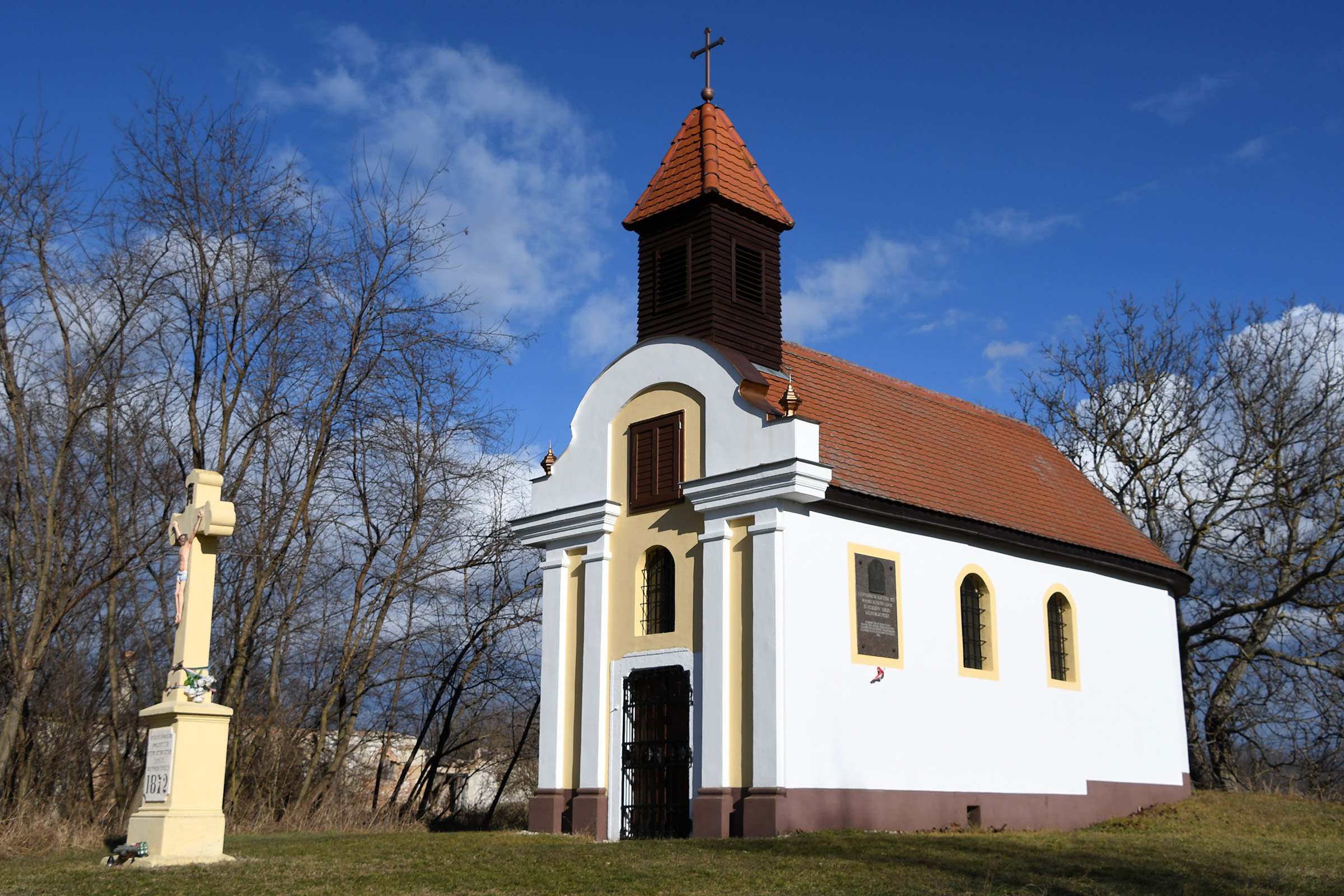
- Kossuth Chapel in Csárdapuszta

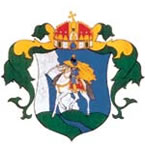
- Coat of arms

- Location of Veszprém county in Hungary

- Location of Bakonyság
- Coordinates: 47.39977°N 17.65041°E
- Country: Hungary
- County: Veszprém

Area
  - Total: 8.56 km^{2} (3.31 sq mi)

Population (2004)
  - Total: 84
  - Density: 9.81/km^{2} (25.4/sq mi)
- Time zone: UTC+1 (CET)
  - Summer (DST): UTC+2 (CEST)
- Postal code: 8557
- Area code: 89

Bakonyság is a village in Veszprém county, Hungary.

== Location ==
It is located in the Central Transdanubia region, at the junction of the Transdanubia Central Mountains and the Kisalföld, in the northern part of Veszprém County, at the northern foot of the Northern Bakony Mountains, approximately 75 kilometers from the county seat, Veszprém, and approximately 22 kilometers from the nearest city, Pápa . The nearest neighboring settlement is Bakonyszentiván.

=== Approach ===
Zsákfalu can only be reached by road on the side road 83 119, which branches off northwards from the main road 832, which connects Pápa and main road 83 with main road 82 via Gice, on the southern outskirts of Bakonyszentiván .

The public road transport service providers are Volánbusz buses.

The settlement is not served by a railway line. The nearest railway station is approximately 6 kilometres away, in Pápateszér (Pápateszér vasútállomás), on the MÁV Tatabánya–Pápa railway line number 13, but passenger traffic ceased on this line in 2007.

== History ==
Its name comes from the ancient Hungarian word meaning hill (-ság). Its first written mention dates back to 1332. At that time, it was inhabited by nobles. In the 17th century, it became the property of the Esterházy family, who settled the area, which had become a wasteland, with Hungarian-speaking inhabitants in 1741.

== Religion ==
According to the 2001 census, about 77.5% of the population is Roman Catholic, about 8% is Lutheran, and about 4% is Reformed . About 10.5% do not belong to any church or denomination, or did not answer.

=== Roman Catholic Church ===
It belongs to the parish of Pápateszéri in the Papal District of the Papal Archdiocese of Veszprém as a filia. The title of its Roman Catholic church is: King Saint Ladislaus . Its feast day is on June 27 .

=== Reformed Church ===
The Transdanubian Reformed Church District ( bishopric ) belongs to the Papal Reformed Diocese ( parish ). It is not an independent parish, but a scattered one.

=== Evangelical Church ===
It belongs to the Bakonyszentlászló Evangelical Parish in the Diocese of Veszprém of the Western (Transdanubian) Evangelical Church District as a scattered parish.
