= Béb =

Béb Wieb
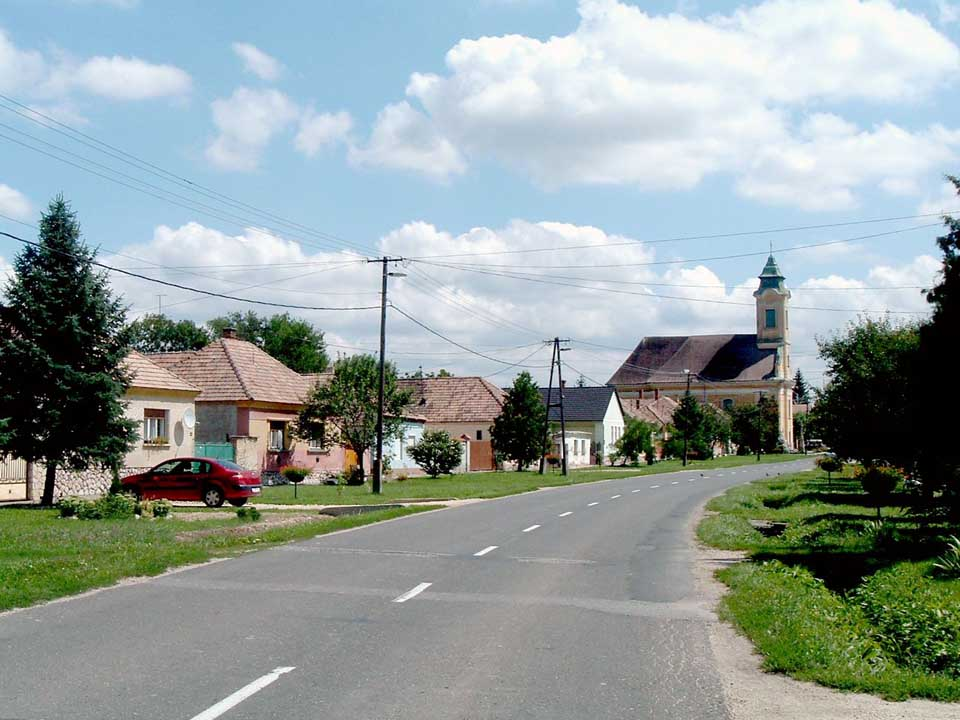

- Flag Coat of arms

- Location of Veszprém county in Hungary

- Location of Béb
- Coordinates: 47.34391°N 17.59944°E
- Country: Hungary
- County: Veszprém

Area
  - Total: 7.04 km^{2} (2.72 sq mi)

Population (2004)
  - Total: 241
  - Density: 34.23/km^{2} (88.7/sq mi)
- Time zone: UTC+1 (CET)
  - Summer (DST): UTC+2 (CEST)
- Postal code: 8565
- Area code: 89

Béb (German: Wieb) is a village in Veszprém County, Hungary.
