= Bakonytamási =

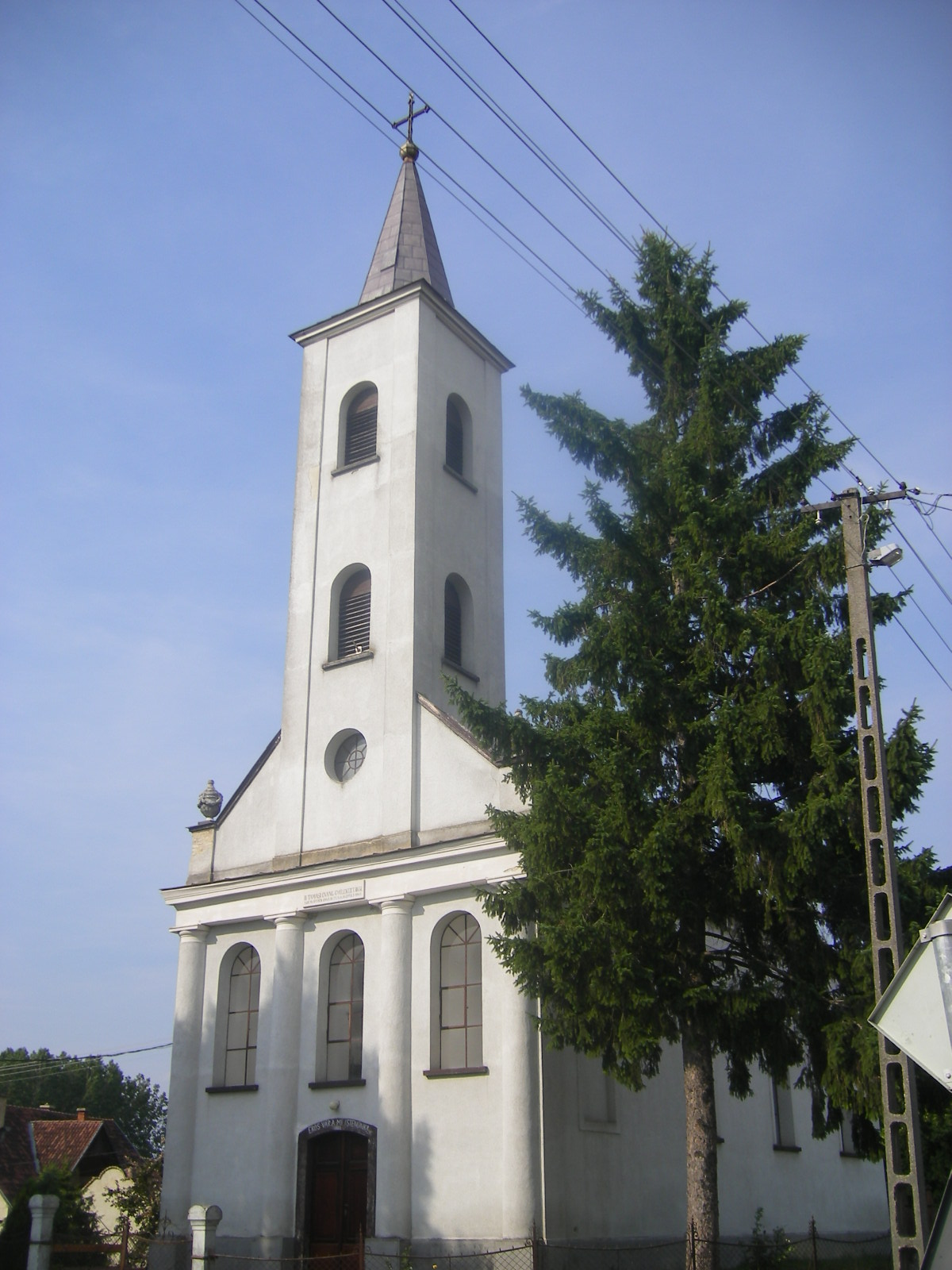

- Flag Coat of arms

- Location of Veszprém county in Hungary

- Location of Bakonytamási
- Coordinates: 47.41232°N 17.73246°E
- Country: Hungary
- County: Veszprém

Area
  - Total: 20.49 km^{2} (7.91 sq mi)

Population (2004)
  - Total: 691
  - Density: 33.72/km^{2} (87.3/sq mi)
- Time zone: UTC+1 (CET)
  - Summer (DST): UTC+2 (CEST)
- Postal code: 8555
- Area code: 89

Bakonytamási (Hungarian pronunciation: [ˈbɒkoɲtɒmaːʃi]) is a village in Veszprém county, Hungary.

In the 19th and 20th centuries, a small Jewish community lived in the village, in 1910 35 Jews lived in the village, most of whom were murdered in the Holocaust. The community had a Jewish cemetery.
