= Bakonyjákó =

Bakonyjákó Jaka
- Flag Coat of arms

- Location of Bakonyjákó in Hungary
- Coordinates: 47.2251°N 17.603°E
- Country: Hungary
- Region: Central Transdanubia
- County: Veszprém

Area
  - Total: 47.18 km^{2} (18.22 sq mi)

Population (2012)
  - Total: 613
  - Density: 13.0/km^{2} (33.7/sq mi)
- Time zone: UTC+1 (CET)
  - Summer (DST): UTC+2 (CEST)
- Postal code: 8581
- Area code: +36 89
- Website: http://bakonyjako.hu/

Bakonyjákó (German: Jaka) is a village in Veszprém County, Hungary.
