= Békás =

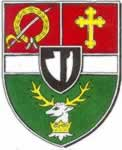
- Coat of arms

- Location of Veszprém county in Hungary

- Location of Békás
- Coordinates: 47.33297°N 17.35316°E
- Country: Hungary
- County: Veszprém

Area
  - Total: 6.52 km^{2} (2.52 sq mi)

Population (2004)
  - Total: 210
  - Density: 32.2/km^{2} (83/sq mi)
- Time zone: UTC+1 (CET)
  - Summer (DST): UTC+2 (CEST)
- Postal code: 8515
- Area code: 89

Békás is a village in Veszprém county, Hungary.
