= Veszprém County 1st constituency =

Parliamentary constituency in Hungary

- Constituency for the National Assembly
- Location of Veszprém county 01 within Veszprém county

- Location of Veszprém county within Hungary
- County: Veszprém County
- Population: 87,715 (2022)
- Major settlements: Veszprém

Current constituency
- Created: 2011
- Party: Tisza Party
- Member: Levente Gáspár
- Elected: 2026

The Veszprém County 1st parliamentary constituency is one of the 106 constituencies into which the territory of Hungary is divided by Act CCIII of 2011, and in which voters can elect one member of parliament. The standard abbreviation of the name of the constituency is: Veszprém 01. OEVK. Seat: Veszprém.

== Area ==
The constituency includes the following settlements:

1. Bakonynána
2. Bánd
3. Csehbánya
4. Csetény
5. Dudar
6. Eplény
7. Hajmáskér
8. Hárskút
9. Herend
10. Jásd
11. Királyszentistván
12. Kislőd
13. Lókút
14. Márkó
15. Nemesvámos
16. Olaszfalu
17. Öskü
18. Sóly
19. Szápár
20. Szentgál
21. Tés
22. Úrkút
23. Városlőd
24. Veszprém
25. Vilonya

== Members of parliament ==
Name	Party	Term	Election
Tibor Navracsics	Fidesz-KDNP	2014 – 2015	Results of the 2014 parliamentary election
Zoltán Kész	Independent	2015 – 2018	Results of the 2015 by-election
Péter Ovádi	Fidesz-KDNP	2018–2026	Results of the 2018 parliamentary election
Péter Ovádi	Fidesz-KDNP	2018–2026	Results of the 2022 parliamentary election
Levente Gáspár	Tisza Party	2026 – present	Results of the 2026 parliamentary election: 57.79%

== Demographics ==
Historical population
Year	Pop.	±%
2011	93,405	—
2022	87,715	−6.1%

The demographics of the constituency are as follows. The population of Veszprém constituency no. 1 was 87,715 on October 1, 2022. The population of the constituency decreased by 5,690 between the 2011 and 2022 censuses. Based on the age composition, the majority of the population in the constituency is middle-aged with 32,143 people, while the least is children with 14,812 people. 86.8% of the population of the constituency has internet access.

According to the highest level of completed education, those with a high school diploma are the most numerous, with 25,084 people, followed by graduates with 19,035 people.

According to economic activity, half of the population is employed, 45,609 people, the second most significant group is inactive earners, who are mainly pensioners, with 19,693 people.

The most significant ethnic group in the constituency is German with 2,351 people and Gypsy with 424 people. The proportion of foreign citizens without Hungarian citizenship is 1.6%.

According to religious composition, the largest religion of the residents of the constituency is Roman Catholic (23,392 people), and a significant community is the Calvinist (5,953 people). The number of those not belonging to a religious community is also significant (10,388 people), the second largest group in the constituency after the Roman Catholic religion.

== Sources ==
- ↑ Vjt.: "2011. évi CCIII. törvény az országgyűlési képviselők választásáról". Nemzeti Jogszabálytár. Magyar Közlöny Lap- és Könyvkiadó Kft.
- ↑ KSH: "Az országgyűlési egyéni választókerületek adatai". Népszámlálás 2011. Központi Statisztikai Hivatal.
