= Borzavár =

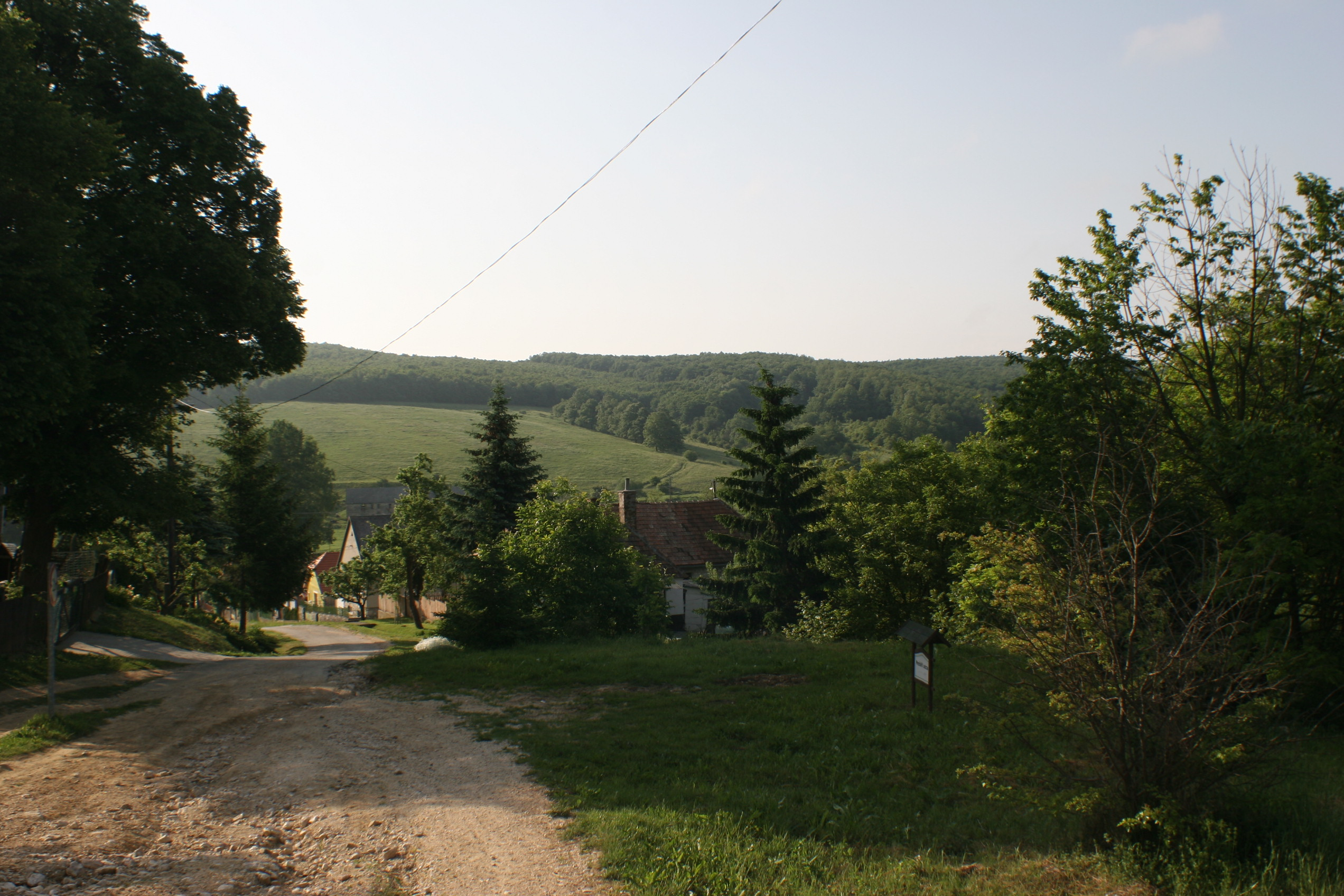

- Flag Coat of arms

- Location of Veszprém county in Hungary

- Location of Borzavár
- Coordinates: 47.29246°N 17.83356°E
- Country: Hungary
- County: Veszprém

Government
  - Mayor: Skobrák Viktória (Ind.)

Area
  - Total: 13 km^{2} (5.0 sq mi)

Population (2022)
  - Total: 750
  - Density: 58/km^{2} (150/sq mi)
- Time zone: UTC+1 (CET)
  - Summer (DST): UTC+2 (CEST)
- Postal code: 8428
- Area code: 88

Borzavár is a village in Veszprém county in Hungary in Zirc District near the town of Zirc (5 km west) in the High Bakony Mountains. From the village and the surrounding countryside, the twin caps of the Koris-hill (709 m or 2326 ft) and the Kék-hill (661 m or 2168 ft) can be seen.

Borzavár's distance to major locations is 30 minutes from the city of Veszprém, 40 minutes from Lake Balaton, 45 minutes from Győr, called the city of three streams, 1 and a half hours from Budapest and Bratislava and 2 hours from Vienna.

== History ==
The village has 750 inhabitants (200ww census), nearly all of them are Hungarian. Neighbouring settlements are Csesznek and Porva villages, and Zirc town. The territory of the settlement has been inhabited since the Stone Age. The village was founded by Daniel Esterházy in 1761. The village was settled by Slovaks, Hungarians and Germans. In 1910 Borzavár was a village in the Zirc district of Veszprém County. Number of its inhabitants in 1910: 1120; 1118 (99,8%) Hungarian and 2 (0,2%) other by mother tongue, 1097 (97,9%) Roman Catholic, 12 (1,1%) Calvinist, 6 (0,5%) Jew and 5 (0,5%) Lutheran by religion.
