= Bakonyszentkirály =

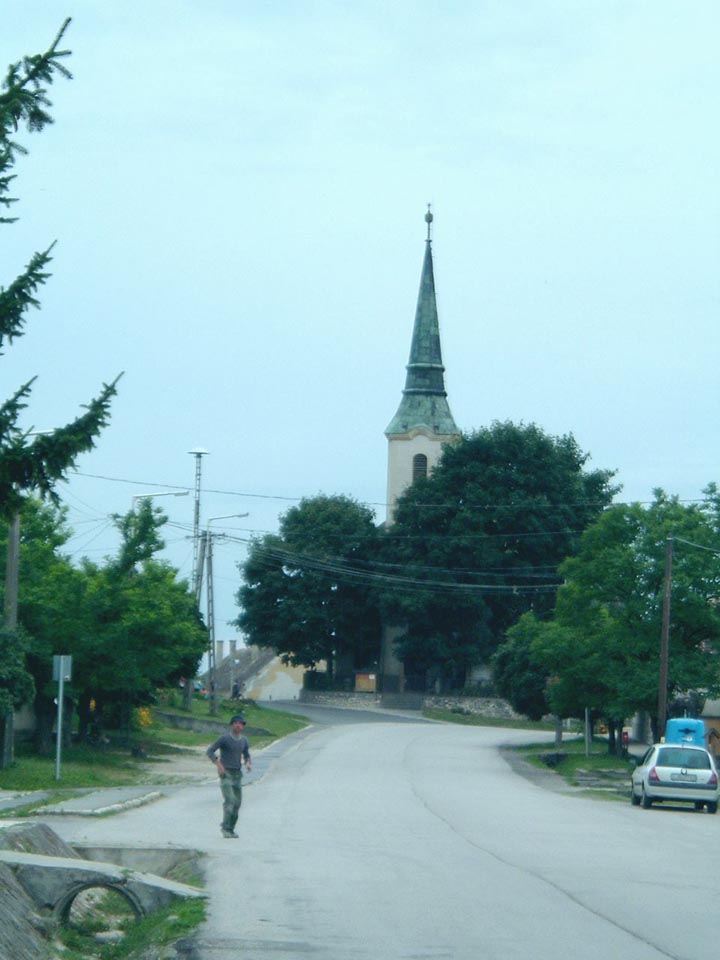

- Flag Coat of arms

- Location of Bakonyszentkirály
- Coordinates: 47.36562°N 17.88008°E
- Country: Hungary
- County: Veszprém

Area
  - Total: 27.90 km^{2} (10.77 sq mi)

Population (2011)
  - Total: 826
  - Density: 29.61/km^{2} (76.7/sq mi)
- Time zone: UTC+1 (CET)
  - Summer (DST): UTC+2 (CEST)
- Postal code: 8430
- Area code: 88

Bakonyszentkirály is a village in Veszprém county, Hungary in Zirc District. It is a small village with a population of 826. The village is situated in the Bakony mountains, some 40 km south of Győr and 50 km north of Lake Balaton.

The quiet, forested area surrounding Bakonyszentkirály, with its fresh air, is ideal for tourism.

== Neighboring villages ==
- Csesznek
- Bakonyoszlop
- Bakonyszentlászló
- Veszprémvarsány

== Gallery ==
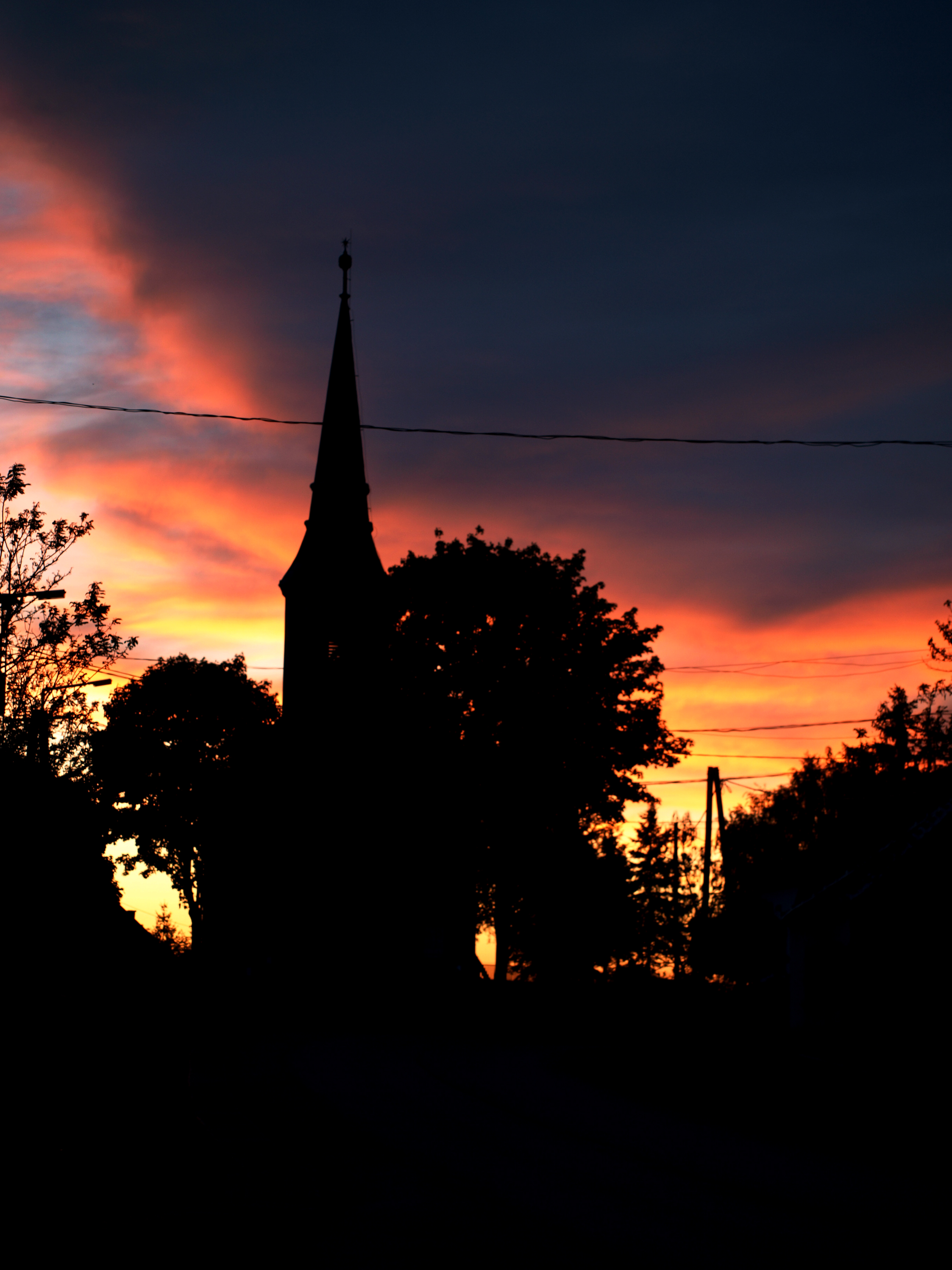
Church by sunset

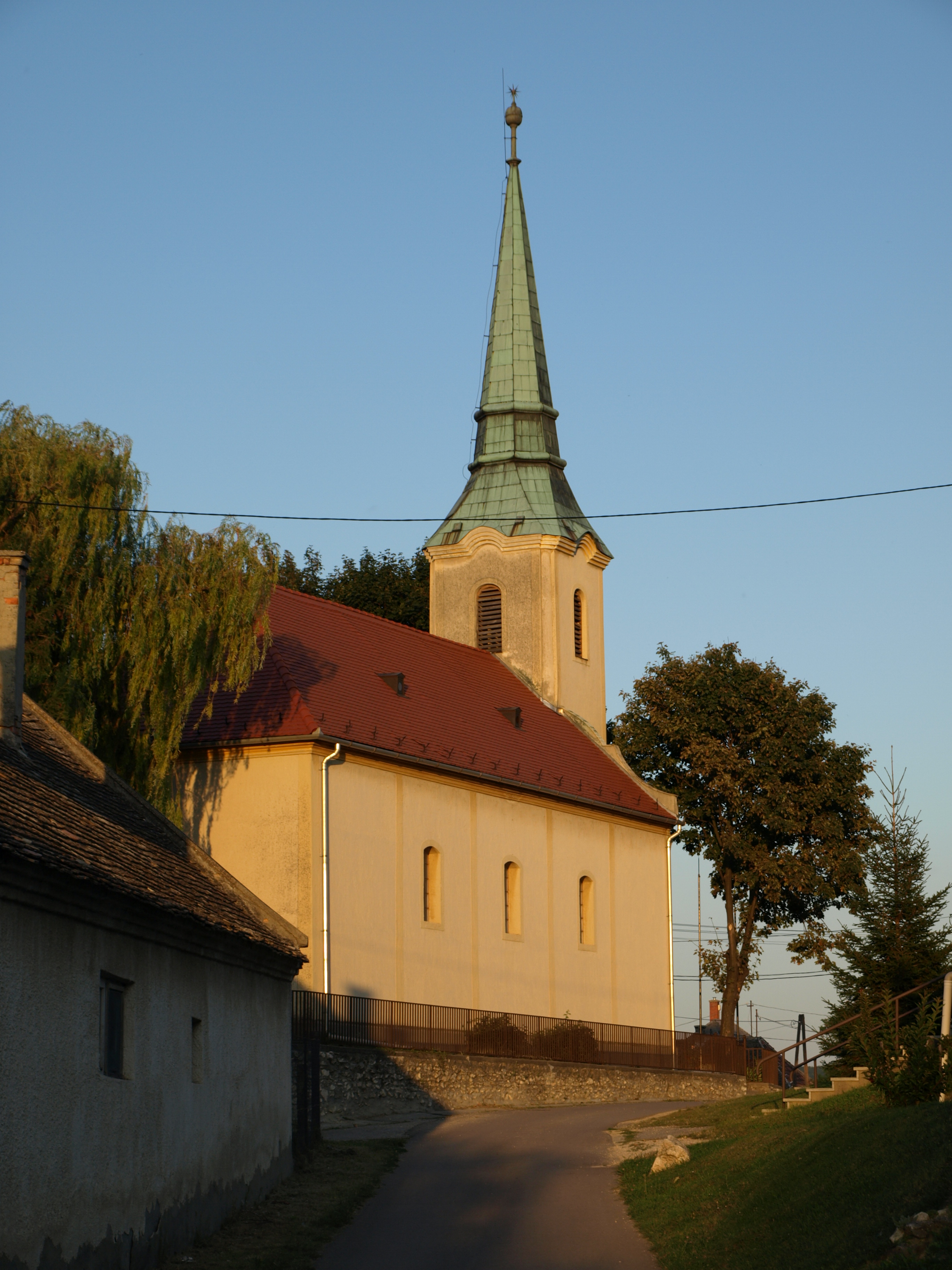
Church in Bakonyszentkirály 2009
