= In Praise of Older Women =

In Praise of Older Women may refer to:

- In Praise of Older Women (book), first published in 1966
- In Praise of Older Women (1978 film)
- In Praise of Older Women (1997 film)
- In Praise of Older Women and Other Crimes - 1985 album by Kid Creole and the Coconuts
