= Levente Gáspár =

Hungarian politician

Member of the National Assembly
- Incumbent
- Assumed office 9 May 2026
- Preceded by: Péter Ovádi
- Constituency: Veszprém 1st

Personal details
- Party: Tisza

Levente Gáspár is a Hungarian politician who was elected member of the National Assembly in 2026 representing the Veszprém County 1st constituency. He previously worked as a physician.
