= Zirc Arboretum =

Arboretum in Zirc, Hungary

Coordinates: 47.261129°N 17.879446°E

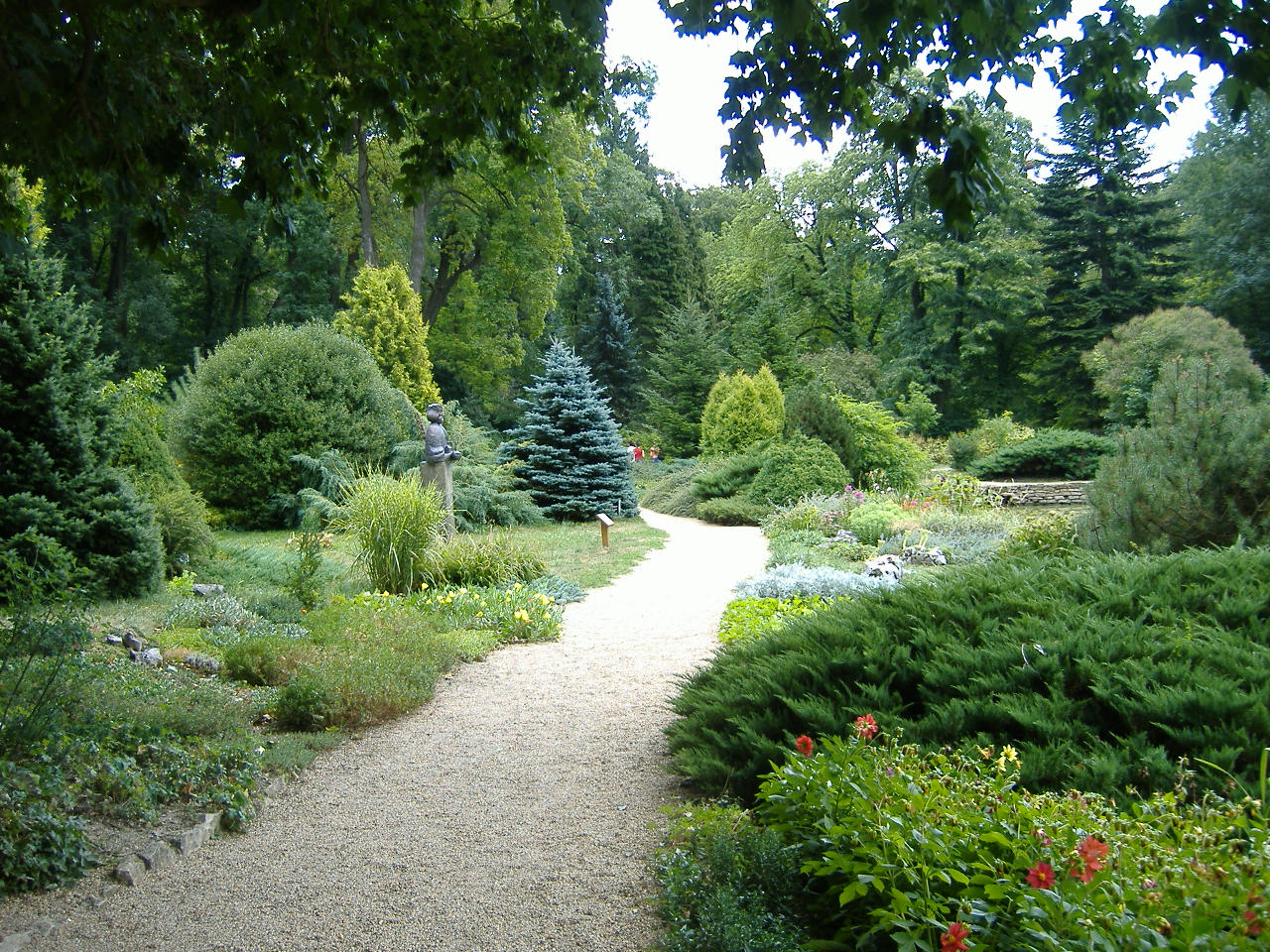
Zirc Arboretum

The Zirc Arboretum is an arboretum in Zirc, Hungary.

The existence of their collection of plants is associated with the arrival of the Cistercian order to Zirc.

In the Forestry House in Bakonybél is an exhibition about the arboretum, environmental protection and forestry.
