= Zirc District =

Zirc District Zirci járás
- Districts of Hungary
- Coat of arms

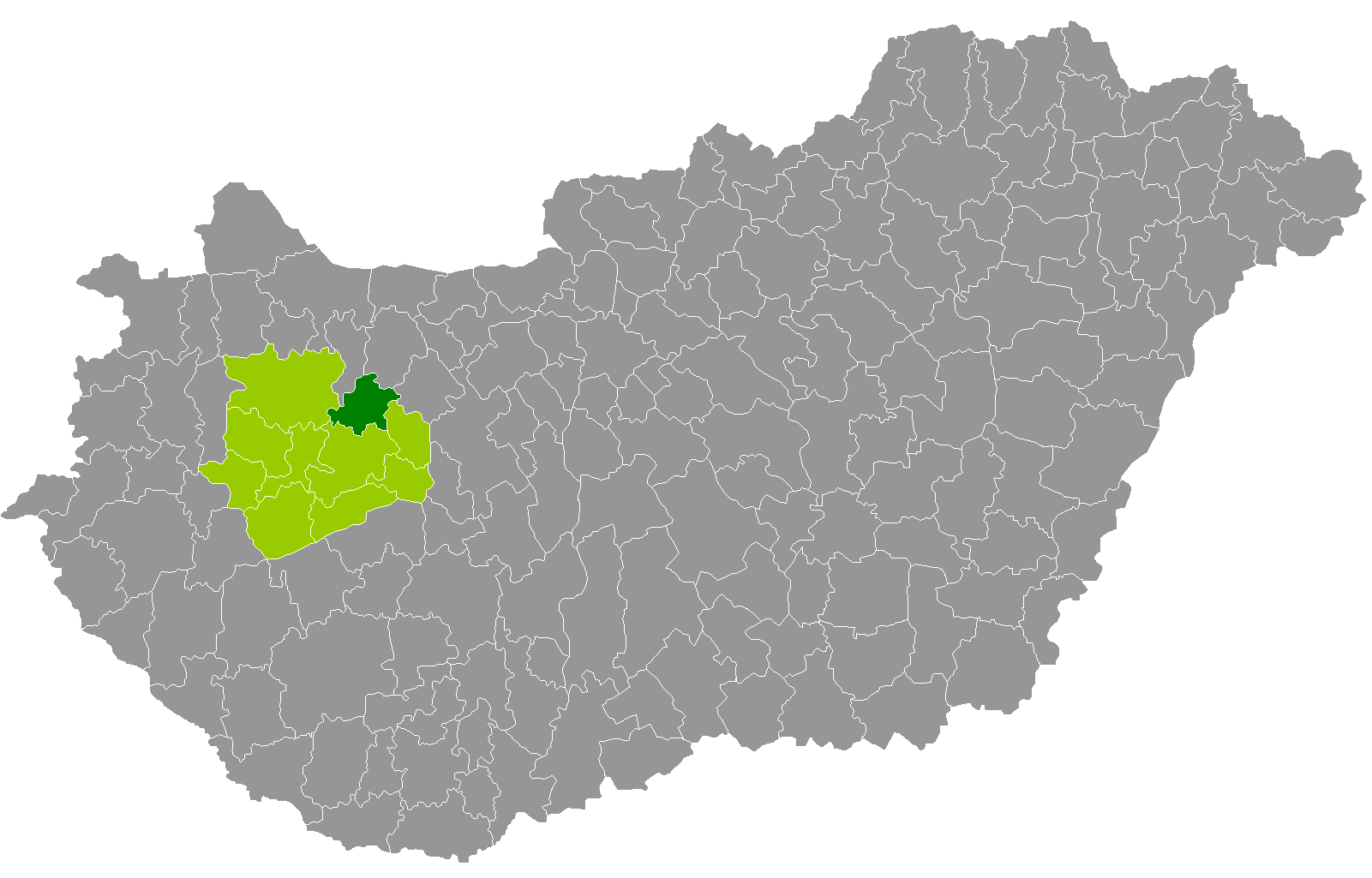
- Zirc District within Hungary and Veszprém County.
- Country: Hungary
- County: Veszprém
- District seat: Zirc

Area
  - Total: 331.02 km^{2} (127.81 sq mi)
  - Rank: 6th in Veszprém

Population (2011 census)
  - Total: 19,386
  - Rank: 8th in Veszprém
  - Density: 59/km^{2} (150/sq mi)

Zirc (Hungarian: Zirci járás) is a district in north-eastern part of Veszprém County. Zirc is also the name of the town where the district seat is found. The district is located in the Central Transdanubia Statistical Region.

== Geography ==
Zirc District borders with Pannonhalma District (Győr-Moson-Sopron County) and Kisbér District (Komárom-Esztergom County) to the north, Mór District (Fejér County) and Várpalota District to the east, Veszprém District to the south, Pápa District to the west. The number of the inhabited places in Zirc District is 15.

== Municipalities ==
The district has 1 town and 14 villages. (ordered by population, as of 1 January 2013)

- Bakonybél (1,264)
- Bakonynána (1,067)
- Bakonyoszlop (441)
- Bakonyszentkirály (867)
- Borzavár (723)
- Csesznek (564)
- Csetény (1,922)
- Dudar (1,643)
- Lókút (411)
- Nagyesztergár (1,196)
- Olaszfalu (1,061)
- Pénzesgyőr (332)
- Porva (435)
- Szápár (485)
- **Zirc** (7,106) – district seat

The bolded municipality is city.

== See also ==
- List of cities and towns in Hungary
