= Zoltán Kész =

Hungarian politician and activist

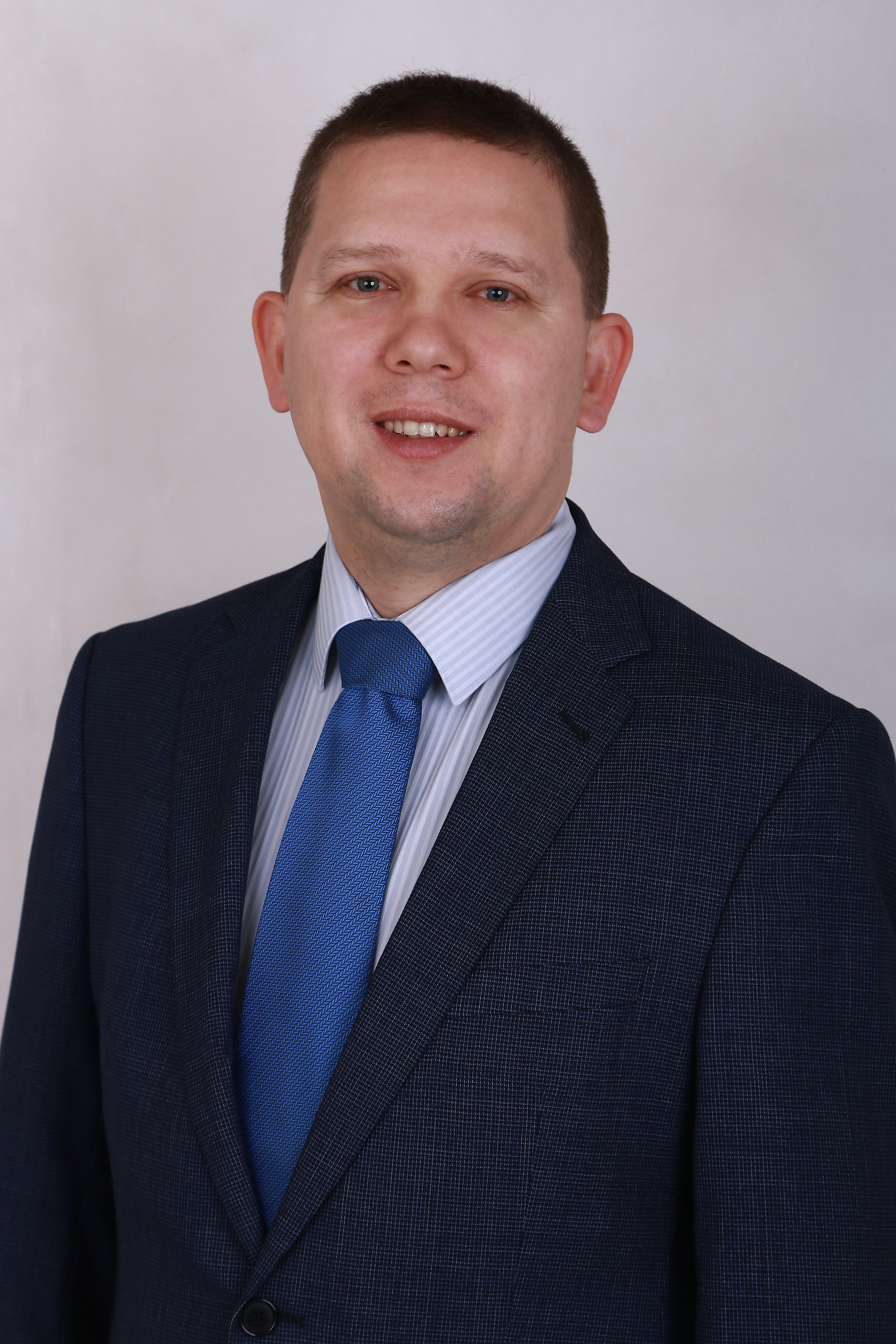
Portrait of Zoltán Kész

Zoltán Kész (born 22 January 1974 in Veszprém, Hungary) is a Hungarian civil activist, former politician and English language teacher. He is a former member of Fidesz but has since become an independent critic of their policies. Kész is now considered a significant member of the political and civil society opposition in Hungary.

In February 2015, a by-election was held in the city of Veszprém (Veszprém County 1st constituency), and Kész was elected as an independent center right candidate. This election lost Fidesz its supermajority in the National Assembly. Facing electoral opposition from the majority government, he was defeated in his re-election bid in 2018.

Since leaving office, Kész has held a number of positions in Hungarian civil society and free market nonprofit groups, including the Free Market Foundation in Hungary and the Civitas Institute.

In 2022, Kész joined the staff of the US-based Consumer Choice Center in 2022 as European Affairs Manager. The Consumer Choice Center has been described as a free-market advocacy group and as a lobby organization.
