= Count Mihály Cseszneky de Milvány et Csesznek =

Hungarian nobleman

Count Mihály Cseszneky de Milvány et Csesznek was a Hungarian nobleman (member of the Cseszneky family) and 16th century border castle hero.

Mihály Cseszneky was appointed chief-lieutenant to the Castle of Várpalota in 1559, after he and Balázs Baranyai had liberated several villages under Ottoman occupation in the southern part of Veszprém and Fejér counties. For his merits King Ferdinand I donated him the villages of Bakonynána, Dudar, Káloz, Láng, Aba and Felegres.

Being the right-hand of castellan György Thury, in 1566 he played an important role in the defense of the castle of Várpalota with 450-500 Hungarian warriors against the 7000-8000 Turkish soldiers of Arslan, Pasha of Buda. Under the leadership of castellan Thury and chief-lieutenant Cseszneky the defenders successfully withstood the siege until Count Salm's relief troops arrived from Győr. Then the warriors of Várpalota helped Salm to reconquer Veszprém and Tata.

Despite being acknowledged as a hero, Count Cseszneky did not receive enough money from the royal treasury for the maintenance of the castle of Várpalota, thus he was compelled to raise funds by making forays against the Ottomans, and sometimes holding the local people to ransom. In 1588 the villagers of the region complained to Ferenc Nádasdy, the "Black Beg" about Cseszneky. Nevertheless, his behavior was not exceptional at that time, and there was no other means to manage the defense of the castle and the peasants against the Turkish attacks.

== Sources ==
- Istvánffy Miklós: Historiarum de rebus Ungaricis
- Szíj Rezső: Várpalota
- Fejér megyei történeti évkönyv
- Hofkammerarchiv Wien
- Dudar története
