= Szápár =

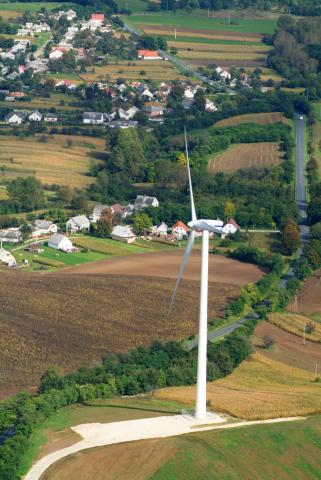

- Location of Szápár
- Coordinates: 47.31629°N 18.04238°E
- Country: Hungary
- County: Veszprém

Area
  - Total: 7.09 km^{2} (2.74 sq mi)

Population (2001)
  - Total: 563
  - Density: 79.41/km^{2} (205.7/sq mi)
- Time zone: UTC+1 (CET)
  - Summer (DST): UTC+2 (CEST)
- Postal code: 8423
- Area code: 88

Szápár (historically: Szapár; Slovak: Capár, Cáfár) is a village in Veszprém county, Hungary in Zirc District.

== History ==
Szápár was the ancestral home of the Szapáry family, and its name was first mentioned in documents in 1341. The Szapáry family's castle on Sánc-mount was destroyed during the Ottoman occupation, along with the village, which later only appeared as a mere settlement.

The area remained uninhabited until the 18th century and was briefly considered part of the Csesznek Castle's properties.

In 1752, the depopulated settlement was repopulated by the Szapáry family with Catholic Slovaks from Nitra and Trencsén counties, some of whom migrated from the nearby Áka. The new residents engaged in agriculture, animal husbandry, and timber and charcoal trade.

In 1855, Ferenc Stinner and Sámuel became the new owners of Szápár.

In the 19th century, a coal mine was opened in the village, and the coal extracted here could be easily ignited with a match due to its high resin content. The mine provided employment for part of the local population, but it was not long-lived as the quantity of coal mined was insufficient for economical operation, and transportation was also an issue. The first mine was soon closed, and it reopened in 1908. Transport was facilitated by a narrow-gauge railway to the Bodajk railway station. However, due to unfavorable production conditions, it permanently closed around the 1930s.

In 1910, out of its 657 inhabitants, 257 were Hungarian, 55 German, and 344 Slovak. Among them, 598 were Roman Catholic, 36 were Reformed, and 15 were Jewish.

In the early 20th century, Szápár belonged to the Zirc district of Veszprém County.

In 1947, as part of the Czechoslovak-Hungarian population exchange, several Slovak families moved from Szápár to the settlement of Martos in the former Upper Hungary (Slovakia), while Hungarian families from the former Upper Hungary relocated to Szápár.
