= Porva =

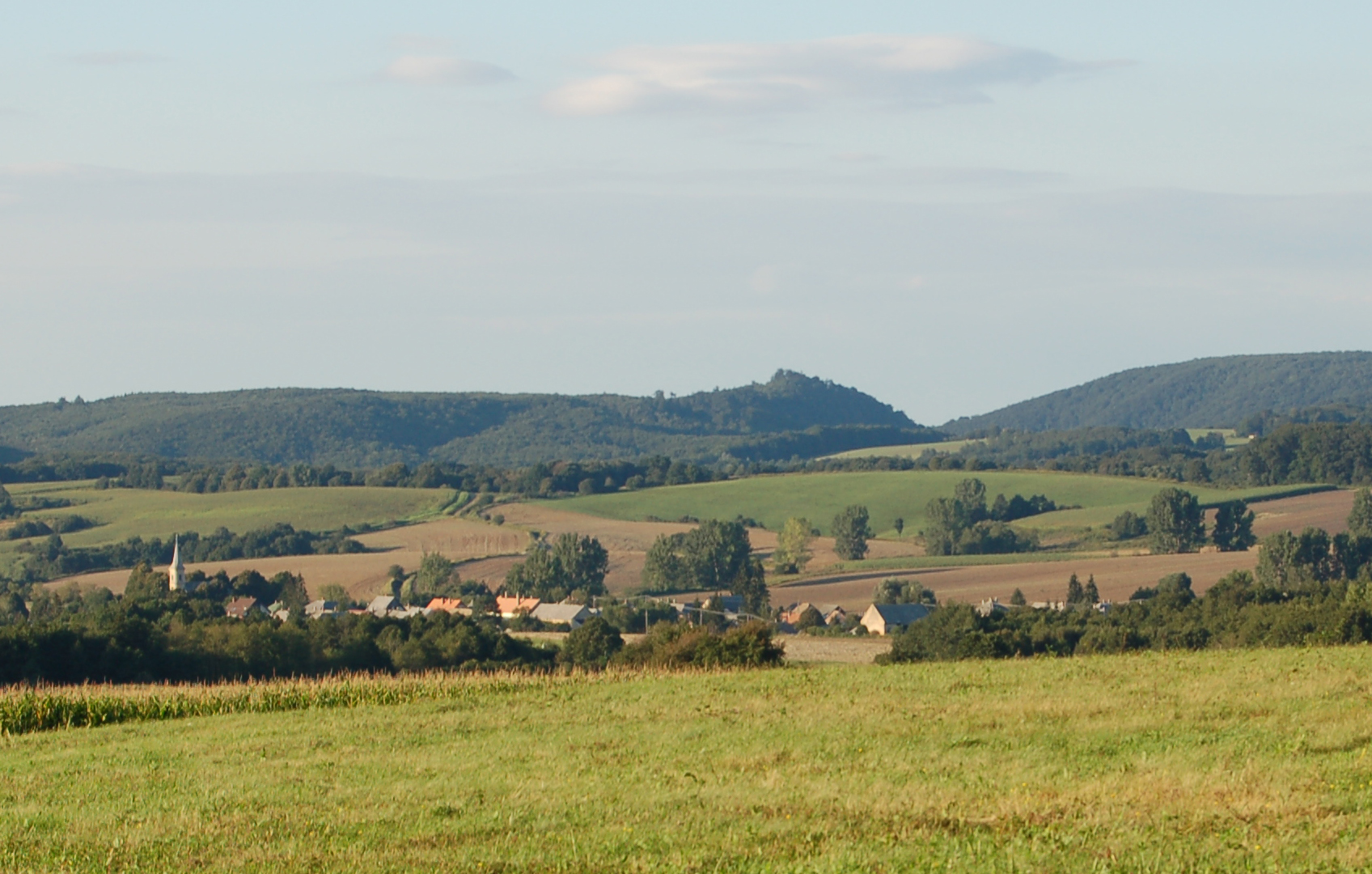
- Porva in the valley

- Flag Coat of arms

- Location of Porva
- Coordinates: 47.311304°N 17.814589°E
- Country: Hungary
- County: Veszprém

Area
  - Total: 28.13 km^{2} (10.86 sq mi)

Population (2004)
  - Total: 478
  - Density: 16.99/km^{2} (44.0/sq mi)
- Time zone: UTC+1 (CET)
  - Summer (DST): UTC+2 (CEST)
- Postal code: 8429
- Area code: 88

Porva is a village in Veszprém county, Hungary in Zirc District. Located in the High Bakony Mountains, 6 km (3.75 mi) from the city of Zirc and it is around 400 m (1313 ft) above sea level. From the village and the surrounding country side the twin caps of the Koris-hill (709 m or 2326 ft) and the Kék-hill (661 m or 2168 ft) creates a panoramic view.

By car 5 minutes from Zirc with its historical abbey, about 30 minutes from the city of Veszprém, 40 minutes from lake Lake Balaton, 45 minutes from Győr, the city of three streams, 1.5 hours from Budapest and Bratislava and 2 hours from Vienna.

== History ==
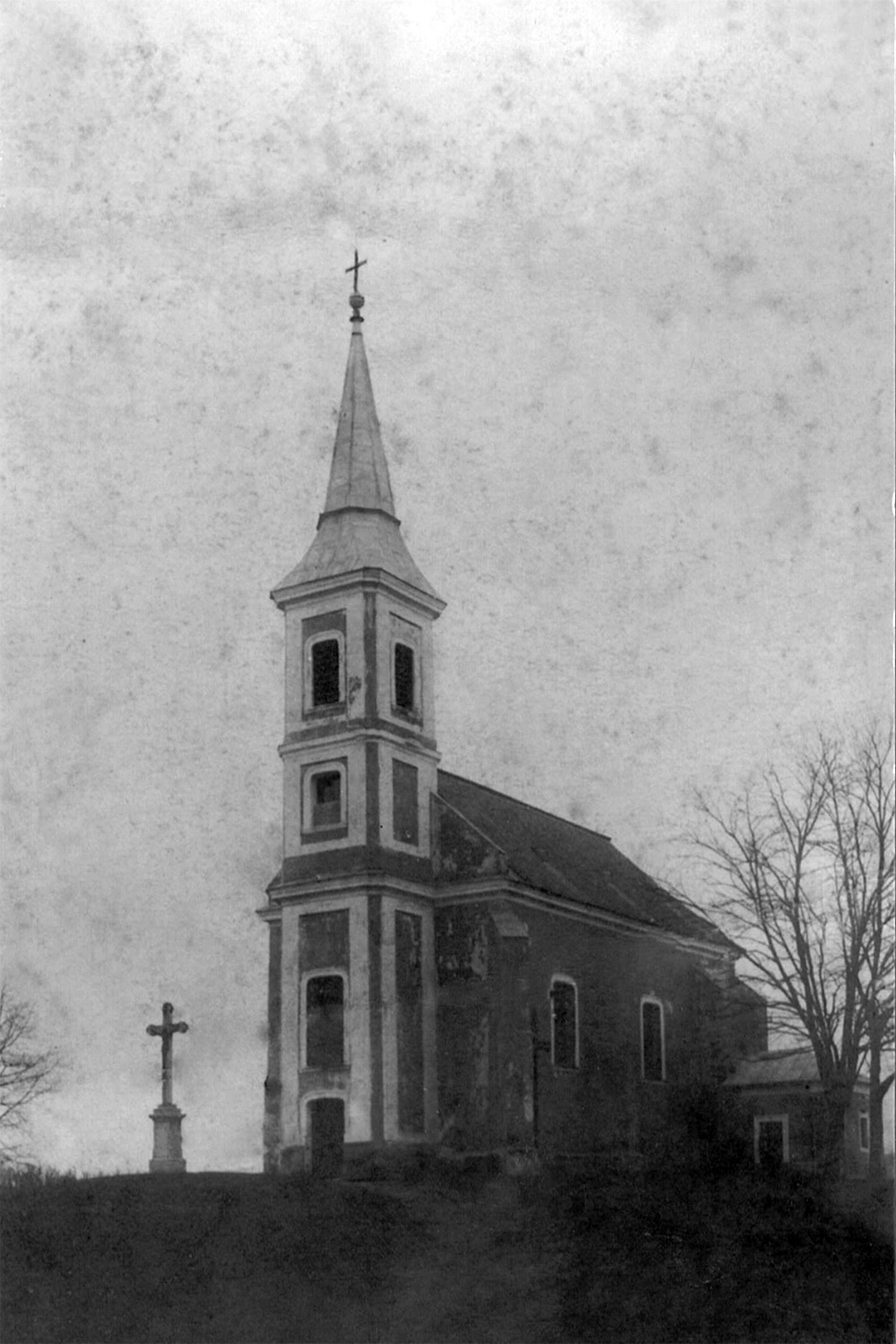
The Church of Porva

Porva has an ancient history and is mentioned among about 40 other villages and cities in the founding document of Hungary. This document can still be seen in the library of the Pannonhalma Archabbey.

Between 1782 and 1784 the current church was erected over the ruins of the palos monastery. The building was built in a gothic baroque style. There is very little left from its rich history. The ruins were buried and the cultural treasures were stolen or moved to other places. The old palos monastery was already deserted during the beginning of the Turkish occupation.

On the ruins stand the numerous time renovated church guarding the past centuries spirit. The descendant of the Szapolyai family Perenszy Pálné born Zápolya Orsolya was buried in 1520 in a red marble mausoleum that is still visible today. The churches main altar was built by Roskovitz Ignác the floor is covered with kelheim stones. The building is in gothic style with baroque sections outside and inside. On the face of the church two marble memorials were erected for the memory of the first and Second World War’s casualties from the village.

On the north wall of the church the original monasteries base walls are still there. The rich history of the town and place names are evident.

The church and the vicarage of Porva used to belong to the Archabbey of Pannonhalma. After World War II however the Russian invaders took possession of the vicarage to establish their regional headquarters. The Facade of the vicarage was destroyed as a Russian repercussion for the Hungarian revolution of 1956

== Surroundings ==
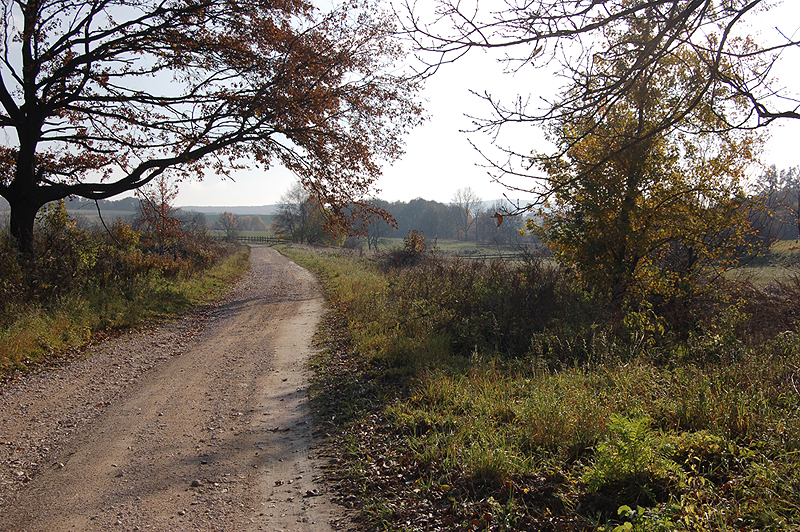
High Bakony Park near Porva

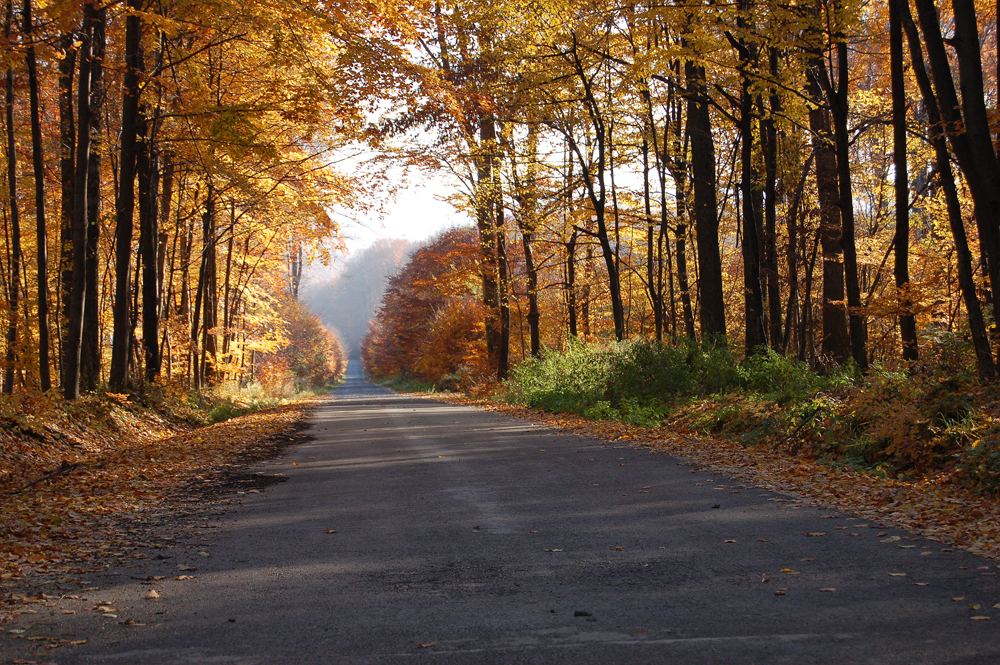
High Bakony Park slopes of Köris Hegy

Köris-hill (Hungarian: Köris-hegy), the Bakony hills highest point, forms together with the neighbouring Kék-hill (Hungarian: Kék-hegy). It is used as a compass by the travelers of the Bakony hills especially because of the lookout tower on the top of Köris-hegy named after Péter Vajda(1808–1846), a naturalist and poet-writer. First of Porva and its neighbor Borzavár, further away the Vértes hills the shimmering Balaton, the Badacsony hills to the north Pannonhalma.

From Porva it is a 2 kilometers walk through the surrounding forests to The High Bakony Park on the slopes of the Kék-hill and the Köris-hill and about 5 kilometers to the top of Köris-hegy.

The region is known for outdoor activities like hiking, horse riding, swimming and ballooning.

The Csárda-teto (441 m or 1312 ft) is mentioned in several local legends. This was a meeting place for the local bandits (betyár) Rózsa Sándor, Zsubri, Panduri and Savanyu Jóska. Even today there are traces and stone ruins of the inn (csárda). Because of the prevalent highwayman activities many of the local caves are named after its old occupants. These caves are found along the valley of the Cuha-patak (Cuha-stream): Savanyú Jóska cave, (Kopince-barlang) Betyár-pamlag, Remete-barlang, Zsivány-barlang. The closest springs include Bön-kút, Zsellér-ko kút, Csörgo-kút, Néma-kút etc. Of all the numerous springs the most notable water of Porva is the Hódos-ér (Hódos-creek) flowing into the Cuha about 10 km (6.25 mi) from the village.

The valley of the Cuha-patak is a tourist destination. The valley is known for the blooming wild-cyclamen flowers. The surrounding forests are full of many different flowers and vegetation. Deer, wild boar, stag deer, fox and sometime a herd of wild sheep (muflon) are to be seen in the area.

From early spring to October the tourist traffic is heavy at the porva-csesznek rail station. Most favor this section of the valley.

== Gallery ==
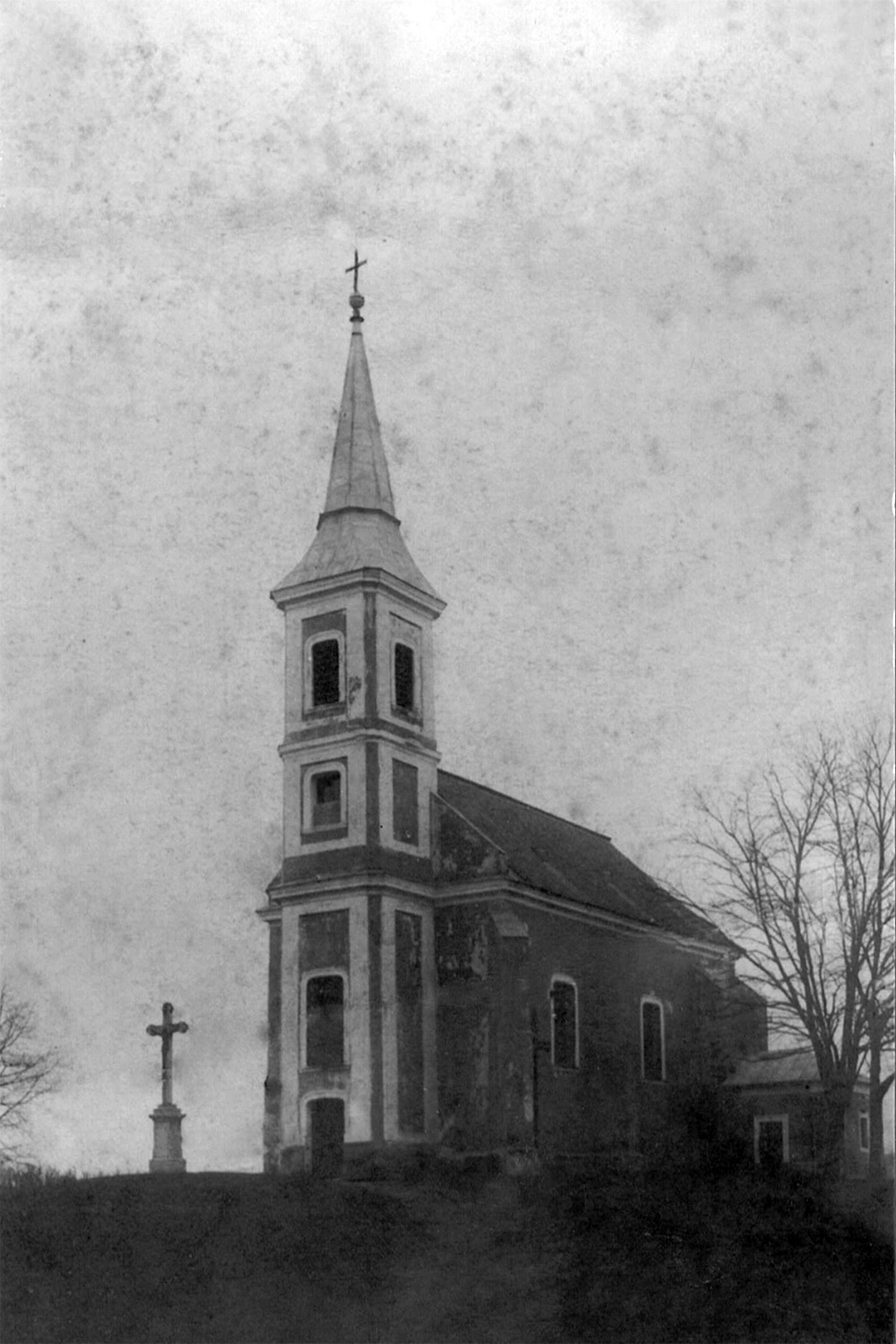
The Church of Porva (1910)

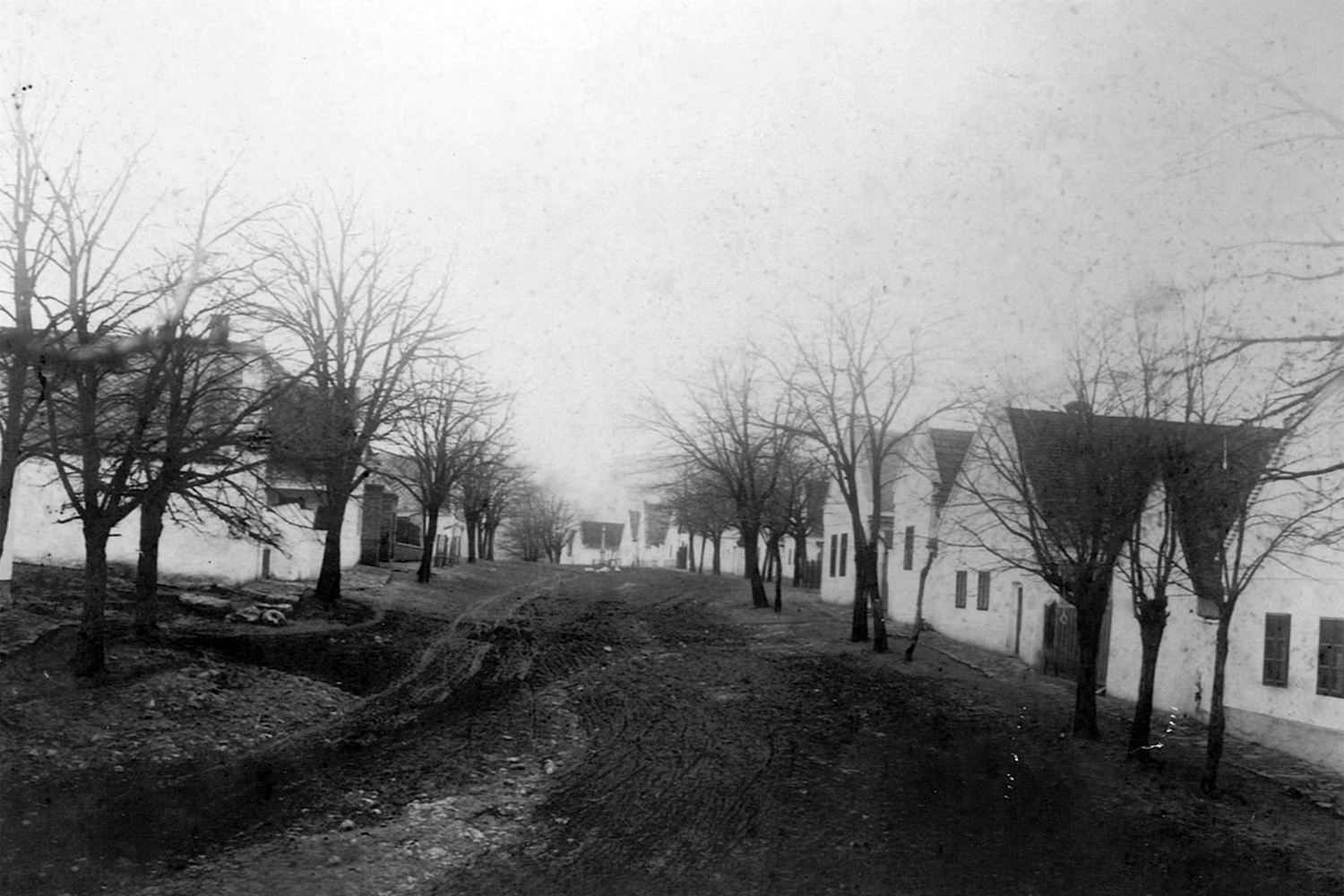
Main street Porva (1910)

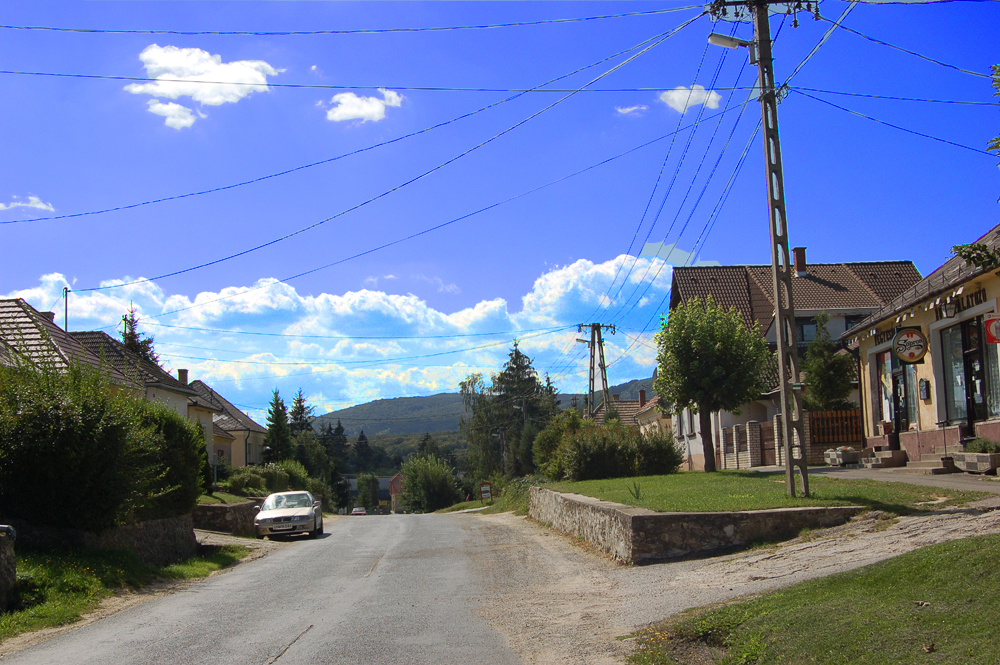
Main street Porva (2008)

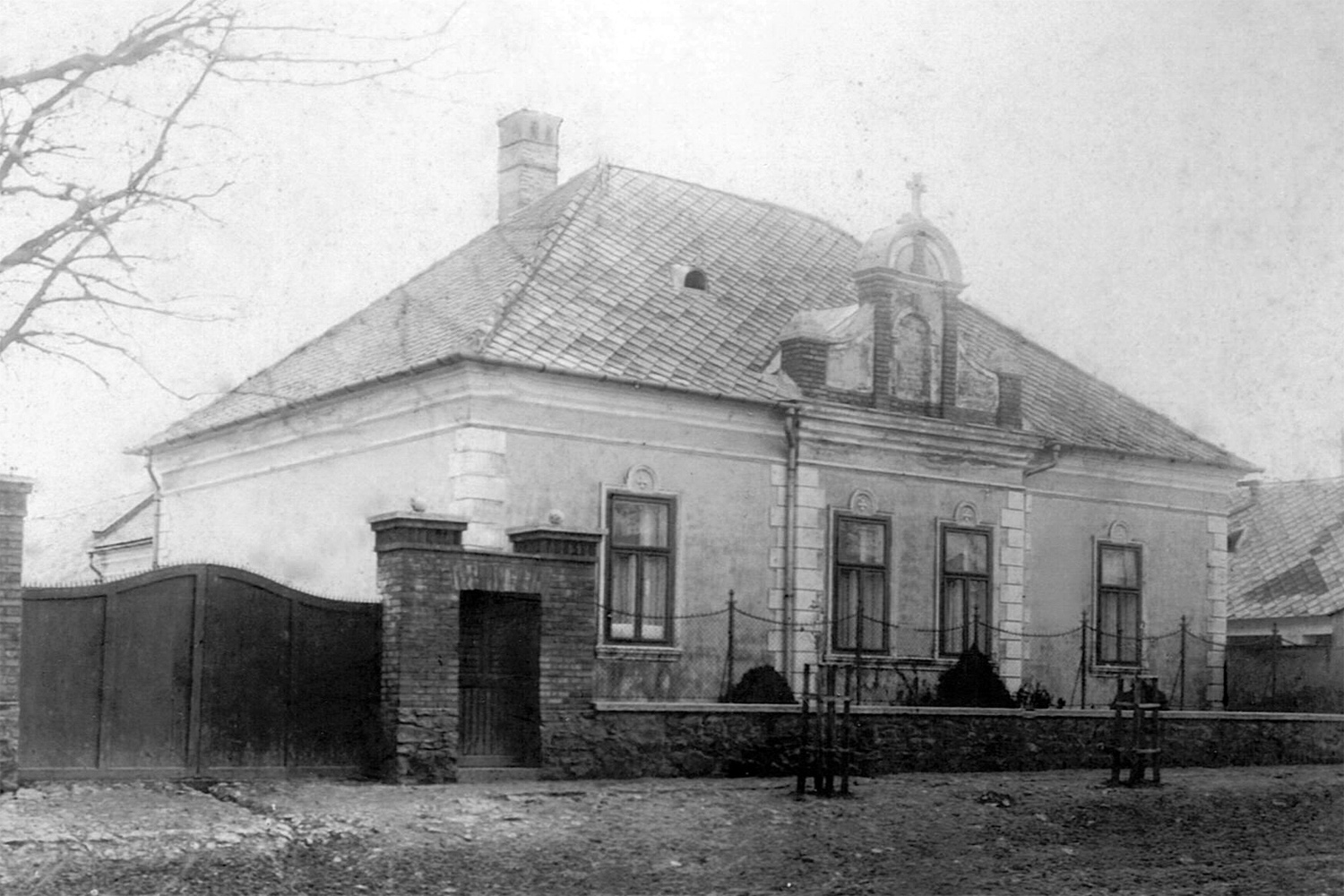
The vicarage (1910) still with facade

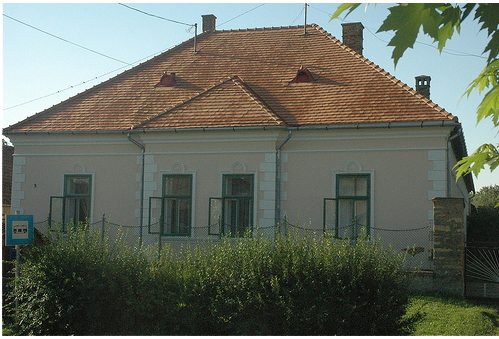
The vicarage (2008) without facade

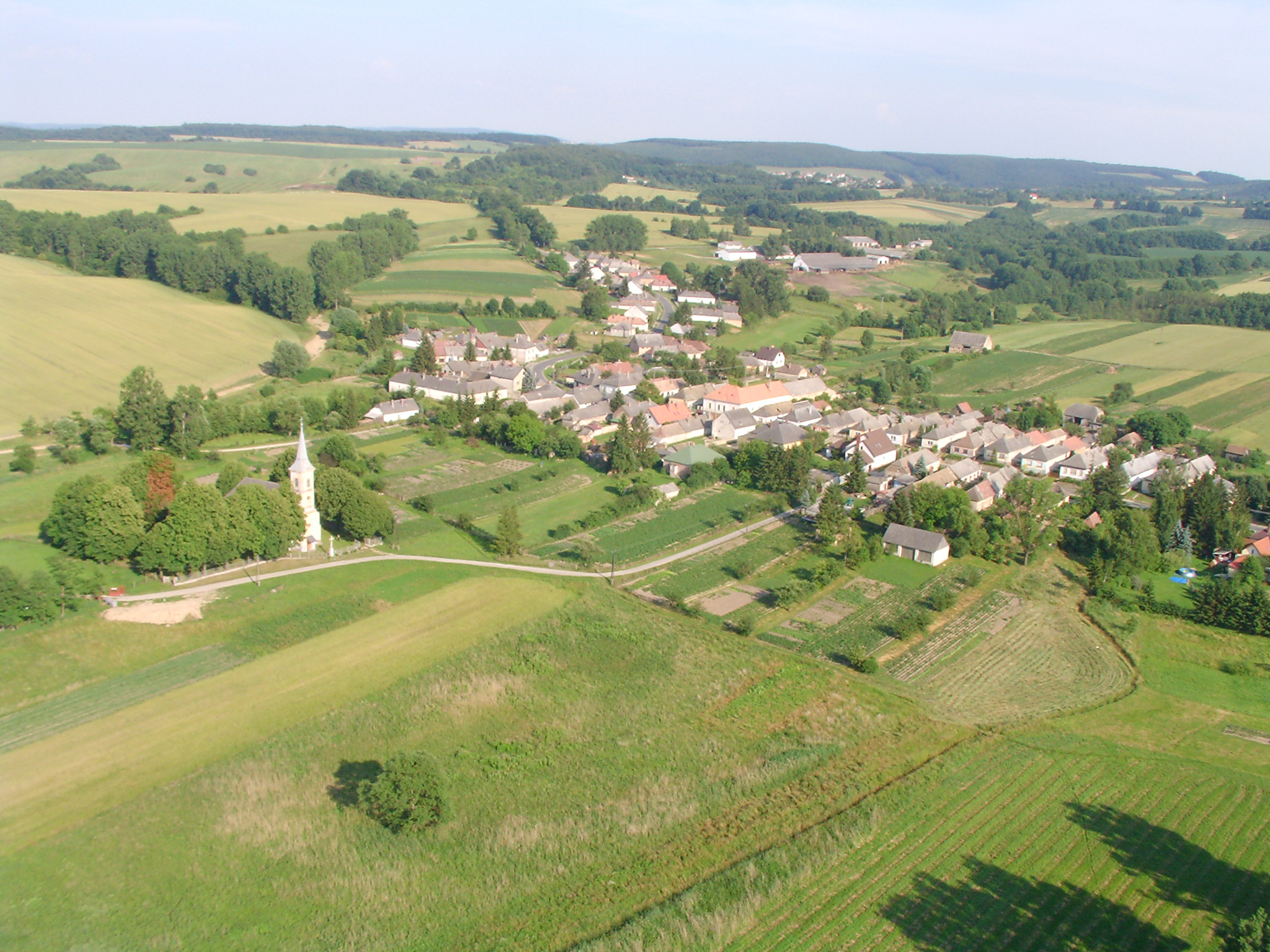
Aerial photo of Porva

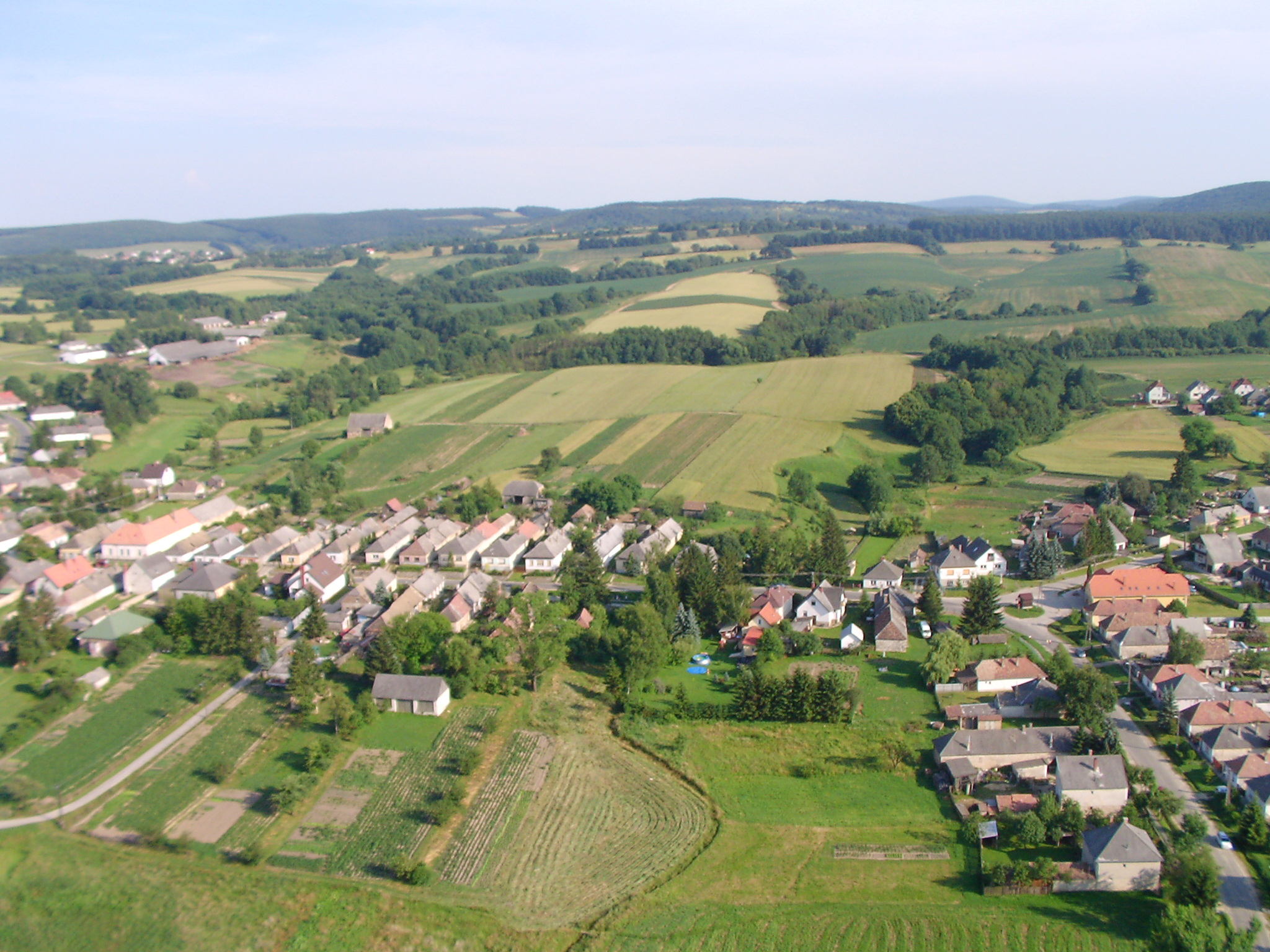
Aerial photo of Porva
