= Bakonyoszlop =

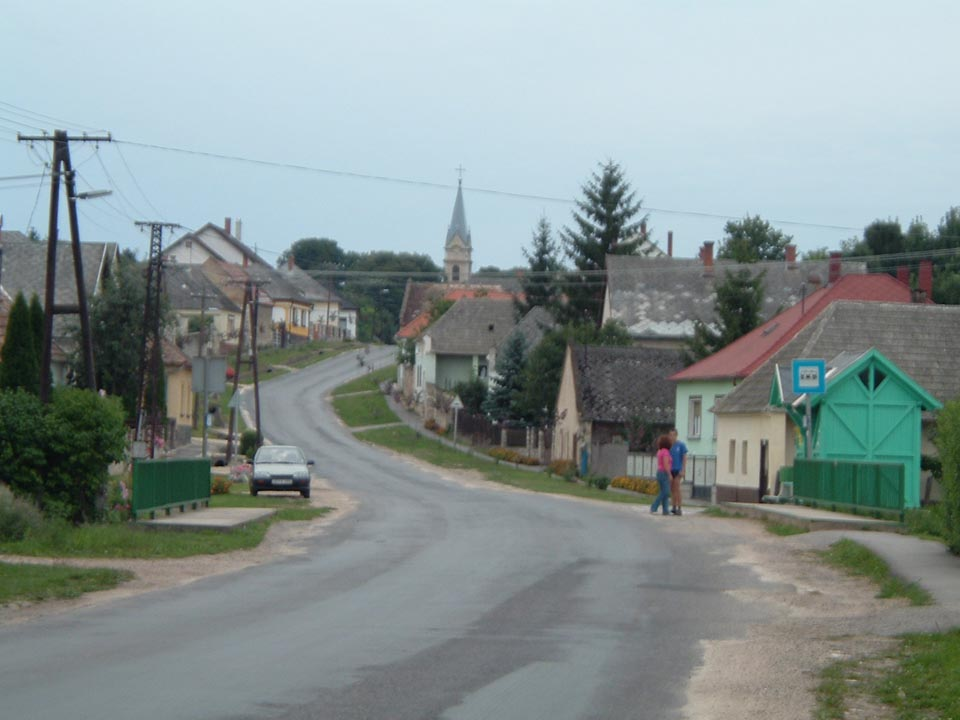

- Coat of arms

- Location of Bakonyoszlop
- Coordinates: 47°20′40″N 17°55′33″E
- Country: Hungary
- Region: Central Transdanubia
- County: Veszprém
- Subregion: Zirci
- Municipality: Község

Area
  - Total: 14.2 km^{2} (5.5 sq mi)

Population (2004)
  - Total: 545
  - Density: 38.38/km^{2} (99.4/sq mi)
- Time zone: UTC+1 (CET)
  - Summer (DST): UTC+2 (CEST)
- Postal code: 8418
- Area code: 88

Bakonyoszlop (Hungarian pronunciation: [ˈbɒkoɲoslop]) is a village in Veszprém county, Hungary in Zirc District. It is located in the Bakony Mountains.
