= Stephen Vizinczey =

Hungarian-Canadian writer (1933–2021)

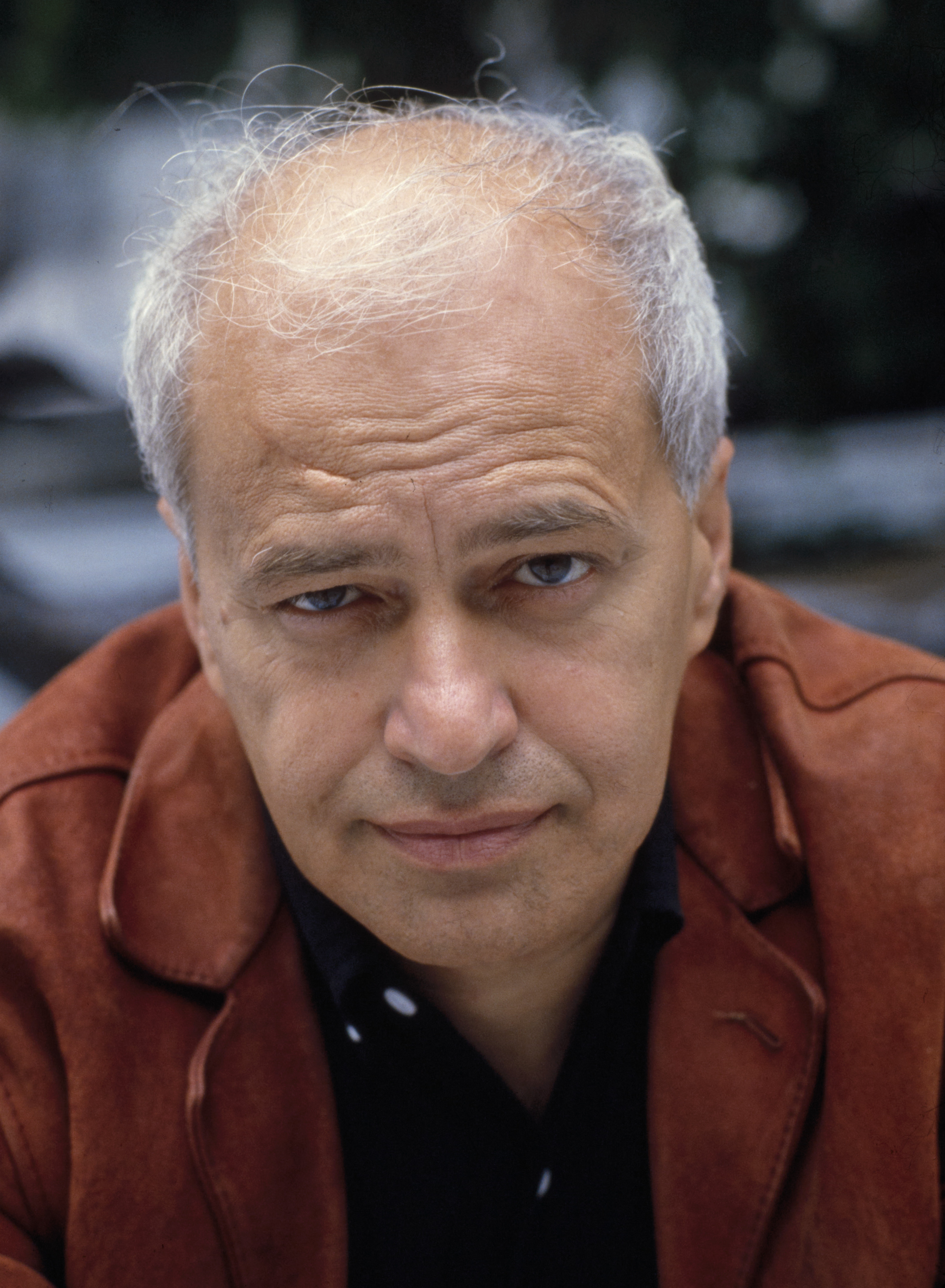
- Born: István Vizinczey; 12 May 1933; Káloz, Hungary
- Died: 18 August 2021 (aged 88); London, England
- Education: University of Budapest
- Occupation: Writer
- Notable work: In Praise of Older Women (1966); An Innocent Millionaire (1983)
- Spouse: Gloria Harron (m. 1963)

Stephen Vizinczey, originally István Vizinczey (12 May 1933 – 18 August 2021) was a Hungarian-Canadian writer. His best-known works were the novels In Praise of Older Women (1965) and An Innocent Millionaire (1983).

== Early career and influences ==
Vizinczey was born in Káloz, Hungary. His first published works were poems which appeared in George Lukacs's Budapest magazine Forum in 1949, when the writer was 16. He studied under Lukacs at the University of Budapest and graduated from the city's Academy of Theatre and Film Arts in 1956. He wrote at that time two plays, The Last Word and Mama, which were banned by the Hungarian Communist regime. Vizinczey took part in the Hungarian Revolution of 1956, and after a short stay in Italy, ended up in Canada speaking only 50 words of English, and eventually taking Canadian citizenship. He learned English writing scripts for Canada's National Film Board and the CBC. In Montreal, he edited a short-lived literary magazine, Exchange, in which unpublished Canadian writers appeared, including Leonard Cohen. After the magazine folded, Vizinczey moved to Toronto, where he met Gloria Harron, a programme organiser with the CBC, and they married in 1963. In 1966, they moved to London, in order to promote his first novel, In Praise of Older Women. Originally self-published in 1965 in Canada, where it was a bestseller, the book was first published in London in 1966 by Barrie & Rockliff.

Vizinczey cited his literary heroes as Pushkin, Gogol, Dostoevsky, Balzac, Stendhal and Kleist.

== In Praise of Older Women ==
In Praise of Older Women: the amorous recollections of András Vajda is a Bildungsroman whose young narrator has sexual encounters with women in their thirties and forties in Hungary, Italy, and Canada. "The book is dedicated to older women and is addressed to young men—and the connection between the two is my proposition" is the book's epigraph. Kildare Dobbs wrote in Saturday Night, "Here is this Hungarian rebel who in 1957 could scarcely speak a word of our language and who even today speaks it with an impenetrable accent and whose name moreover we can't pronounce, and he has the gall to place himself, with his first book and in his thirty-third year, among the masters of plain English prose..."

In 2001, it was translated for the first time into French, and became a best-seller in France. It has twice been made into a movie: a 1978 Canadian production starring Tom Berenger as Andras Vajda, and a subsequent 1997 Spanish production featuring Faye Dunaway as Condesa.

In 2010, the book was reissued as a Penguin Modern Classic.

== An Innocent Millionaire ==
First published in 1983, An Innocent Millionaire tells the story of Mark Niven, the son of an American actor who makes an uncertain living in Europe. "Mankind, we are told, is divided into the haves and the have-nots, but there are those who both have the goods and do not, and they live the tensest lives." The boy who spends his childhood in various countries "has no emotional address" and once financial pressures led to the divorce of his parents, he becomes enchanted with the idea of finding a Spanish treasure ship. He finds both love and the treasure ship, but the fortune turns into a nightmare and his happiness with a married woman ends in tragedy.

The novel was praised by critics including Graham Greene and Anthony Burgess. Burgess wrote in Punch that Vizinczey could "teach the English how to write English", praised the novel's "prose style and its sly apophthegms, as well as in the solidity of its characters, good and detestable alike." Burgess ended his review by saying: "I was entertained but also deeply moved: here is a novel set bang in the middle of our corrupt world that, in some curious way, breathes a kind of desperate hope." The London Literary Review called the novel "an authentic social epic, which reunites, after an estrangement of nearly a century, intellectual and moral edification with exuberant entertainment."

== Essays ==
Vizinczey wrote two books of literary, philosophical and political essays: The Rules of Chaos (1969) and Truth and Lies in Literature (1985).

== Bibliography ==
- In Praise of Older Women (1966)
- The Rules of Chaos (1969)
- An Innocent Millionaire (1983)
- Truth and Lies in Literature (1985)
- The Man with the Magic Touch (1994)
- If Only (2016)
- 3 Wishes (2020)
