= Olaszfalu =

- Location of Veszprém county in Hungary

- Location of Olaszfalu
- Coordinates: 47.24341°N 17.90533°E
- Country: Hungary
- County: Veszprém

Area
  - Total: 42.8 km^{2} (16.5 sq mi)

Population (2023)
  - Total: 1,069
  - Density: 25.86/km^{2} (67.0/sq mi)
- Time zone: UTC+1 (CET)
  - Summer (DST): UTC+2 (CEST)
- Postal code: 8414
- Area code: 88

Olaszfalu is a village in Veszprém county, Hungary in Zirc District with a population of 1,069. It is a popular place visited by hikers coming from the nearby hiking trails and Eperjes mountains.

The village can be reached from highway no. 82 and is located 20 km from Veszprém and 120 km from Budapest.

== History ==
In 1182, King Béla III invited French cistercian monks to settle in Zirc. The monks brought craftsmen with them and settled peacefully on the land for some centuries.

During the Turkish occupation of Hungary (1541 - 1699), the village was destroyed, however others soon settled after this.

In the early 18th century, the majority of the village population were reformed protestant. The catholic monks at Zirc abbey offered the people of the village a choice: convert to Catholicism or they would no longer be welcome in the village and would be forced to move away.

Those who stayed merged with the German speaking population from nearby villages, and by the early 20th century 80% of families spoke German as their first language.

=== Soviet occupation ===
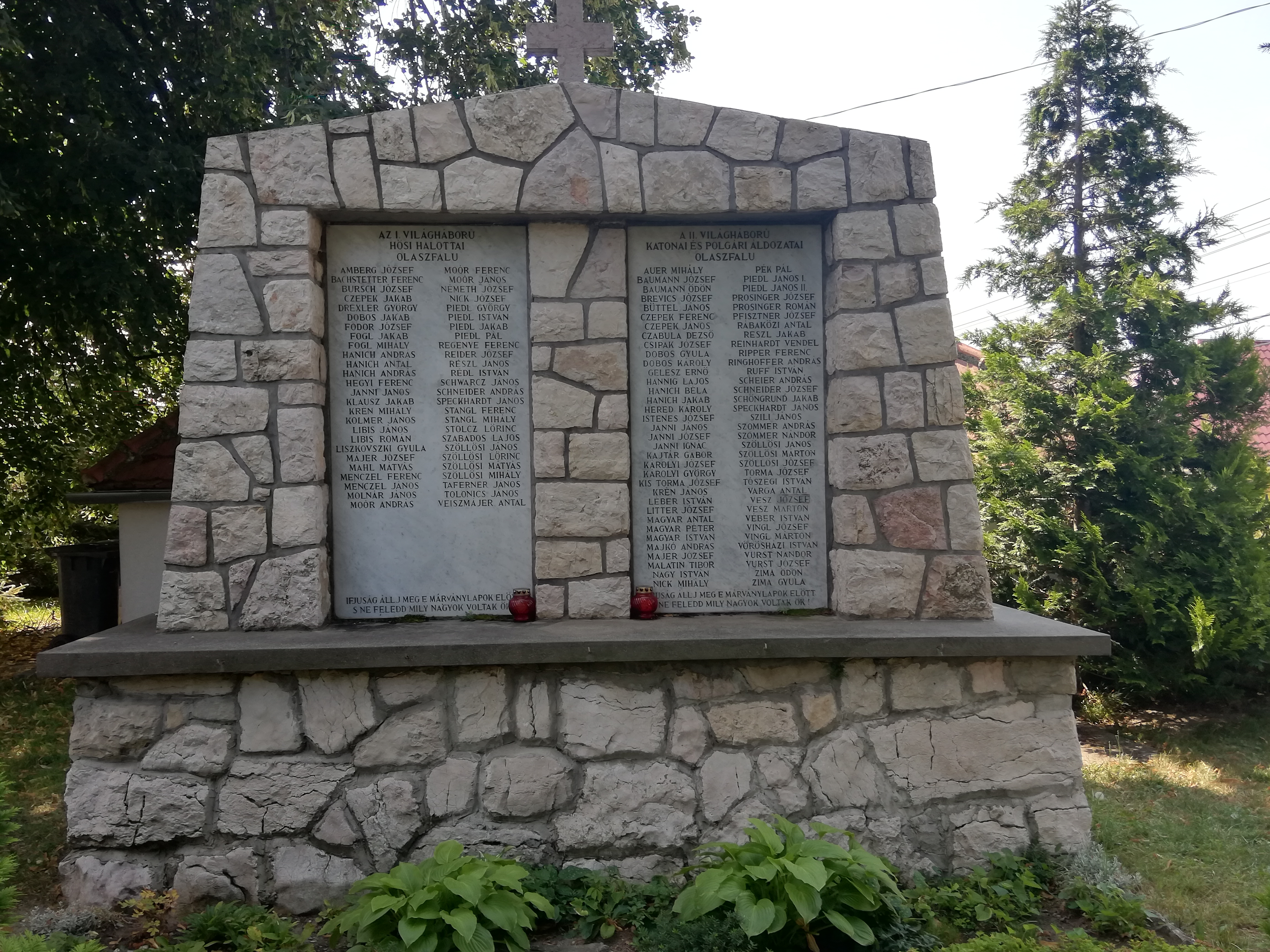
War memorial depicting the names of those killed by the Soviets

On Thursday 22 March 1945, Soviet troops advancing from Felsőpere arrived in the village late at night. The soldiers opened fire on homes while civilians hid in cellars and attics to avoid injury. On Good Friday (Friday 23 March 1945), soviet soldiers carried out unprovoked executions, targeting children and teenagers in the village and killing 32 young people.

=== Recent events ===
In 2023, the International Shepherd's Festival was held in Olaszfalu, giving the opportunity for traditional shepherds to meet, discuss ecology and celebrate their way of life.

== Church ==
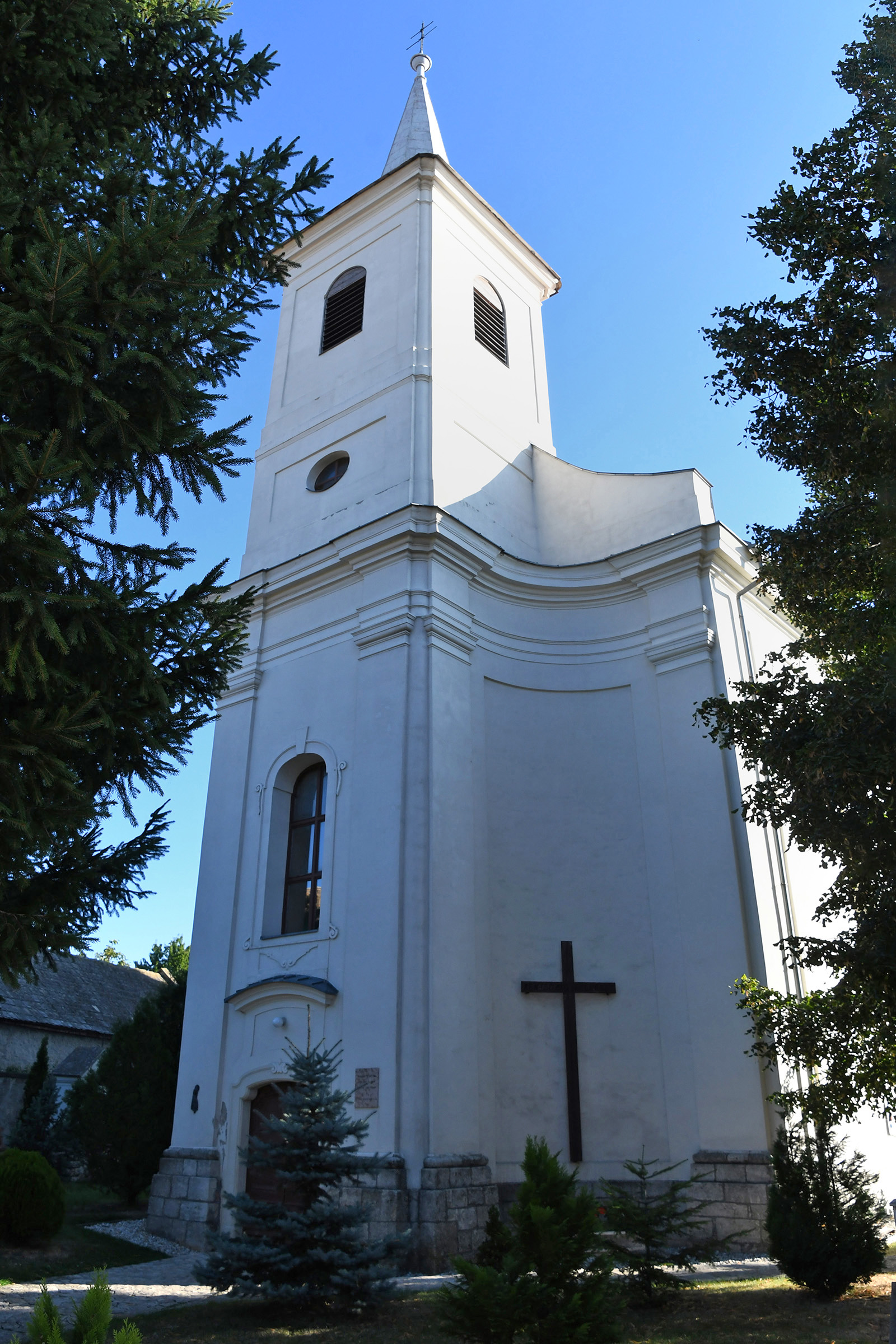
The Roman Catholic church

Because 90% of the village identifies as Roman Catholic, the baroque style church is an important landmark in the village. The church was built in 1764 but burned down in 1802, however it was quickly rebuilt and has remained since then.

Religion is an important part of the village's culture, with many practicing and attending church regularly.

Olaszfalu take pride in preserving numerous religious practices such as Easter noisemaking (instead of church bell ringing), meat blessings, Holy Saturday processions, Nativity plays, and an annual feast in honour of the Village's patron saint.

The main altarpiece was designed and built by Bernhardt Krause.

== Annual events ==
=== Everyone's Christmas ===
Once a year in December, a village wide celebration of the festive season is held with nativity plays, performances from local schoolchildren, and a performance from the local choir.

=== Potato harvest festival ===
This festival has been a tradition since 2003, and is one of the biggest celebrations in the village every year. Held in September, the festival is not only a celebration of harvest, but of Hungarian culture and tradition as well. A plethora of potato related activities are available for both adults and children to participate in: performances from local musicians and schoolchildren, folk music and dancing, and a playhouse with craft activities like potato sculpting and printing.

There are also competitions for local farmers based on potato size, variety, and taste.

=== Village remembrance ===
every year on the closest Sunday to the 23rd of March, a remembrance ceremony is held at the war memorial honouring those who lost their lives in both world wars and the soviet massacre of 1945.

== Villax Ferdinand Primary School ==
Headmistress Hontai Hajnalka is the current head of the primary school.

=== History ===
Villax Ferdinand primary school is named after the Cistercian Abbot Ferdinand Villax, who founded the school in 1837. He advocated for knowledge of the sciences for everyone and wished to help everybody acquire it. In the first written records of the school, this kind of education institution was labeled as "unique in the area". On the 30th of September 2000, the school was named after him and a bronze statue was erected outside the school (designed by Béla Raffay).

== Tourism ==
Olaszfalu is a popular place for tourists to visit because of the nearby mountains and forest along with its notoriety as a cultural hotspot in the region. There are many hiking and biking paths close by and visitors can enjoy the natural beauty of the forest and forage for edible plants along the paths. The 16th century church ruins on the outskirts of the town provide rich and interesting religious history. The village also encompasses Alsóperei Nádasdy Botanical gardens which is a protected area reserved for nature appreciation and recreational hunting.
