= Lókút =

- Flag Coat of arms

- Location of Veszprém county in Hungary

- Location of Lókút
- Coordinates: 47.20680°N 17.85666°E
- Country: Hungary
- County: Veszprém

Area
  - Total: 18.11 km^{2} (6.99 sq mi)

Population (2004)
  - Total: 526
  - Density: 29.04/km^{2} (75.2/sq mi)
- Time zone: UTC+1 (CET)
  - Summer (DST): UTC+2 (CEST)
- Postal code: 8425
- Area code: 87

Lókút (German: Roßbrunn) is a village in Veszprém county, Hungary in Zirc District.
