= Káloz =

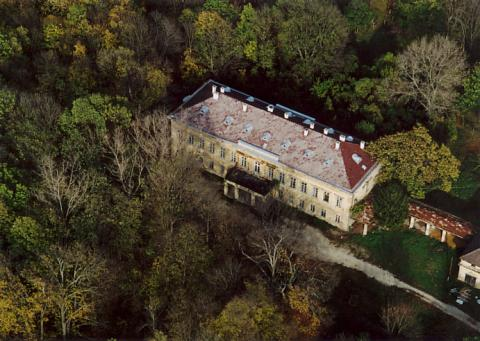
- Bird's-eye view of the palace

- Flag Coat of arms

- Location of Káloz in Hungary
- Coordinates: 46.9573°N 18.4847°E
- Country: Hungary
- Region: Central Transdanubia
- County: Fejér

Area
  - Total: 47.79 km^{2} (18.45 sq mi)

Population (2012)
  - Total: 2,402
  - Density: 50.26/km^{2} (130.2/sq mi)
- Time zone: UTC+1 (CET)
  - Summer (DST): UTC+2 (CEST)
- Postal code: 8124
- Area code: +36 25
- Website: http://kaloz.hu/

Káloz is a village in Fejér county, Hungary.

In 1559 it was property of Mihály Cseszneky and Balázs Baranyai.

== Sources ==
- Szíj Rezső: Várpalota
- Fejér megyei történeti évkönyv
- Hofkammerarchiv Wien
- Dudar története
