= Bakonynána =

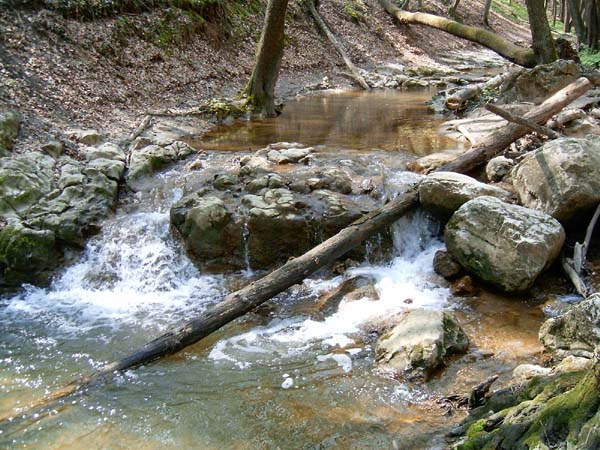
- The Gaja river near Bakonynána

- Coat of arms

- Location of Bakonynána
- Coordinates: 47.27988°N 17.97112°E
- Country: Hungary
- County: Veszprém

Area
  - Total: 14.93 km^{2} (5.76 sq mi)

Population (2001)
  - Total: 1,062
  - Density: 71.13/km^{2} (184.2/sq mi)
- Time zone: UTC+1 (CET)
  - Summer (DST): UTC+2 (CEST)
- Postal code: 8422
- Area code: 88

Bakonynána (Hungarian pronunciation: [ˈbɒkoɲnaːnɒ]) is a village in Veszprém county, Hungary in Zirc District.

In 1559 it was property of Mihály Cseszneky.
