= In Praise of Older Women (1997 film) =

En brazos de la mujer madura
- Film poster
- Directed by: Manuel Lombardero
- Screenplay by: Rafael Azcona; Manuel Lombardero
- Based on: In Praise of Older Women by Stephen Vizinczey
- Produced by: Canal+ España; Lolafilms; Sociedad General de Televisión (Sogetel); Sogepaq
- Starring: Juan Diego Botto; Miguel Ángel García; Faye Dunaway; Carme Elias
- Cinematography: José Luis Alcaine
- Edited by: Ernest Blasi
- Music by: José Manuel Pagán
- Release date: 4 April 1997
- Running time: 105 minutes
- Country: Spain
- Languages: Spanish; English; Italian

En brazos de la mujer madura, loosely based on the novel In Praise of Older Women, is a 1997 Spanish coming-of-age film set during and after the Spanish Civil War. As well as recounting the amorous education of a young man, it evokes the political and social conditions of the time.

== Plot ==
When war breaks out in 1936, the boys at a Catholic boarding school in Republican territory are sent home. Andres is one of these boys. Finding that his widowed mother's flat in Gerona is requisitioned and she is far away in La Coruña, he decides to rejoin her by bicycle. Reaching the Aragon front, he is stopped by an Anarchist unit under the charismatic commander Dávalos and is conscripted to help the cook Honorio, who is having an affair with a peasant woman Pilar. Also stopped are a wealthy Englishman and his American wife, la Condesa, for whom Andrés acts as interpreter and is rewarded. He is then sent to safety in Barcelona where he starts an affair with Julia, the virgin daughter of the house, but is evicted before consummation. To live, he starts dealing on the black market and one night tries a prostitute, but she is so bored that he leaves in disgust. The war over, his mother comes back and is set up in a flat by her Falangist lover Victor. Above them lives a married woman Marta, who lends Andrés books and starts an affair. But she and her well-off husband were Republicans and are taken away by the secret police. In the street, Andrés sees Pilar, the working-class girl from the front, and they have a night together. Then at a concert he falls for Bobi, an Italian violinist, and they have a brief idyll. Her orchestra's next engagement is in Vichy France and at the frontier station of Canfranc Andrés rejoins her.

== Cast ==
- Juan Diego Botto - Andrés
- Miguel Ángel García - Andrés (15 yrs)
- Faye Dunaway - la Condesa
- Joanna Pacula - Marta
- Carme Elias - Irene
- Rosana Pastor - Pilar
- Ingrid Rubio - Julia
- Florence Pernel - Bobi
- Ángel de Andrés López - Víctor
- Ramón Barea - Peciña
- Lorena García - Miss Mozar
- Nancho Novo - Honorio
- Ralph Riach - Conde

== See also ==
- In Praise of Older Women (1978)
