= Péter Ovádi =

Hungarian computer scientist and politician

Member of the National Assembly of Hungary
- In office May 2018 – April 2022
- Constituency: Veszprém County 1st constituency

Member of the National Assembly of Hungary
- Incumbent
- Assumed office April 2022

Personal details
- Born: 22 October 1981 (age 44) Veszprém, Hungary

Péter Ovádi (born 22 October 1981 in Veszprém, Hungary) is a Hungarian computer scientist and politician. He is a member of parliament in the National Assembly of Hungary (Országgyűlés) for Veszprém County 1st constituency since May 2018. He has been a member of the legislative committee of the National Assembly and the Committee on Enterprise Development since 8 May.
