= Bakonybél =

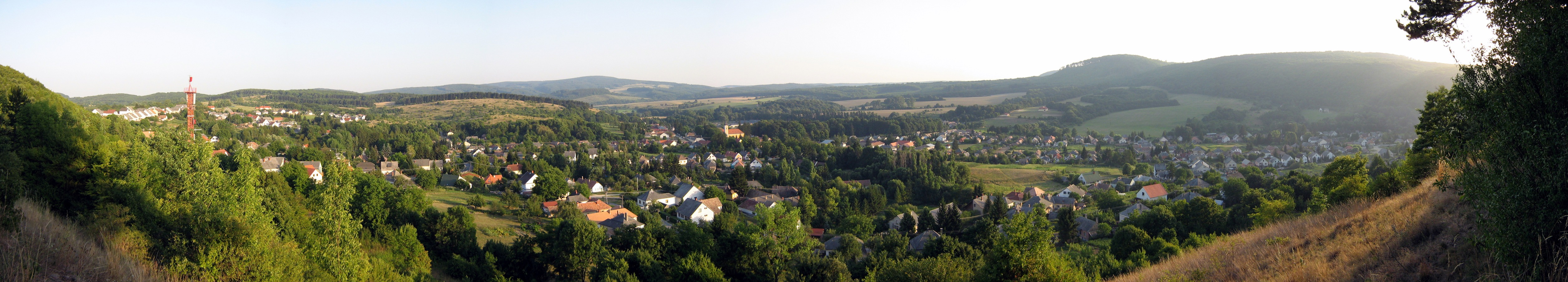
- Bakonybél

- Flag Coat of arms

- Location of Veszprém county in Hungary

- Location of Bakonybél
- Coordinates: 47.25285°N 17.72958°E
- Country: Hungary
- County: Veszprém

Area
  - Total: 24.36 km^{2} (9.41 sq mi)

Population (2004)
  - Total: 1,392
  - Density: 57.14/km^{2} (148.0/sq mi)
- Time zone: UTC+1 (CET)
  - Summer (DST): UTC+2 (CEST)
- Postal code: 8427
- Area code: 88

Bakonybél is a village in Veszprém county, Hungary, in Zirc District. A tourist destination with a number of sights and activities, the village is located in a basin surrounded by nearby mountains.

== History ==
The history of the village is closely connected to the Benedictine Bakonybél Abbey founded by Saint Stephen I in 1018. Saint Gellert resided here as a hermit between 1023 and 1030. The village had been completely destroyed during the Ottoman occupation and was later rebuilt and repopulated with Slovaks and Germans.

=== The Jewish community ===
In the 19th and 20th centuries, a small Jewish community lived in the village, in 1880 23 Jews lived in the village, most of whom were murdered in the Holocaust. The community had a Jewish cemetery.

== Main sights ==
The Benedictine church and monastery were built in 1754 in Baroque style. There is also a chapel close to the village with the statue of Saint Gellert, the stations of Christ's sufferings and the holy trinity, at Ivy Spring (also known as Saint Spring), next to a lake supplied by the spring.

Another sight is the Ethnographic Museum in the village. There is also a museum of nature and forestry called the House of the Bakony Forests.

Another attraction is a 19th-century American ranch, not very far from the village, with horse-related activities.

There are also multiple routes for trips in the nearby forests and hills, offering scenery, caves and a lookout tower on the highest peak of the Bakony Mountains.

== Facilities ==
There is a three star hotel and several guest houses in the village. There are also restaurants and pubs. A number of small grocery stores and also separate greengrocers are available.
There is a community house providing tourist information, a doctor's office, and catering. The village has its own post office, pharmacy, day nursery, primary school and library with Internet access.

== See also ==
- (160001) Bakonybél minor planet,
