= Dudar =

- Flag Coat of arms

- Location of Dudar in Hungary
- Coordinates: 47.3072°N 17.9394°E
- Country: Hungary
- Region: Central Transdanubia
- County: Veszprém

Area
  - Total: 24.58 km^{2} (9.49 sq mi)

Population (2012)
  - Total: 1,534
  - Density: 62.41/km^{2} (161.6/sq mi)
- Time zone: UTC+1 (CET)
  - Summer (DST): UTC+2 (CEST)
- Postal code: 8416
- Area code: +36 88
- Website: https://dudar.hu/

Dudar is a village in Veszprém county, Hungary in Zirc District.

In 1559 it was property of Mihály Cseszneky.

== Sources ==
- Szíj Rezső: Várpalota
- Fejér megyei történeti évkönyv
- Hofkammerarchiv Wien
- Dudar története
