= Csetény =

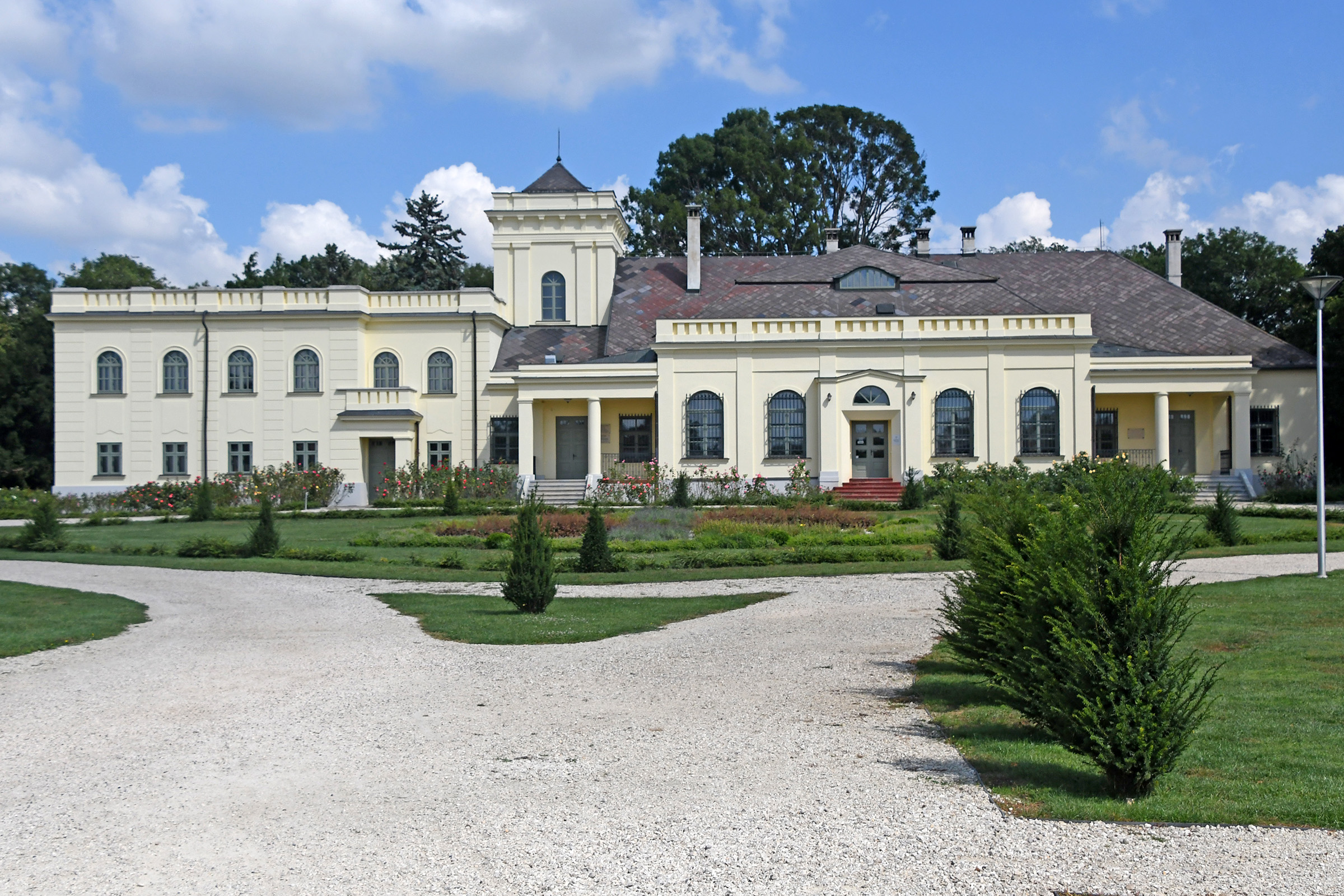
- The Holitscher mansion

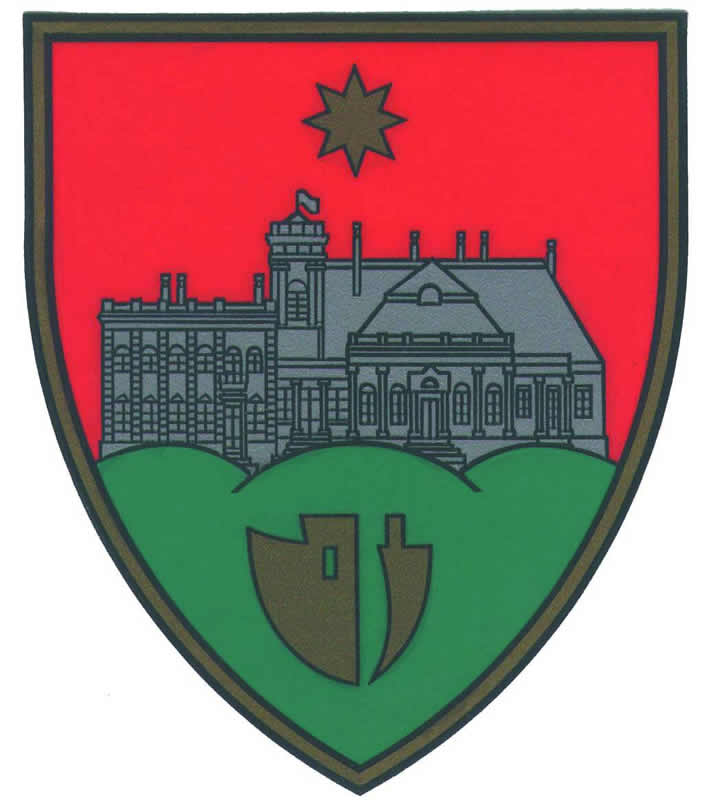
- Coat of arms

- Location of Veszprém county in Hungary

- Location of Csetény
- Coordinates: 47.31766°N 17.99882°E
- Country: Hungary
- County: Veszprém

Area
  - Total: 18.37 km^{2} (7.09 sq mi)

Population (2004)
  - Total: 2,049
  - Density: 111.54/km^{2} (288.9/sq mi)
- Time zone: UTC+1 (CET)
  - Summer (DST): UTC+2 (CEST)
- Postal code: 8417
- Area code: 88

Csetény is a village in Veszprém county, Hungary in Zirc District.
