= Bakony =

Mountainous region in Transdanubia, Hungary

Coordinates: 47°15′N 17°50′E

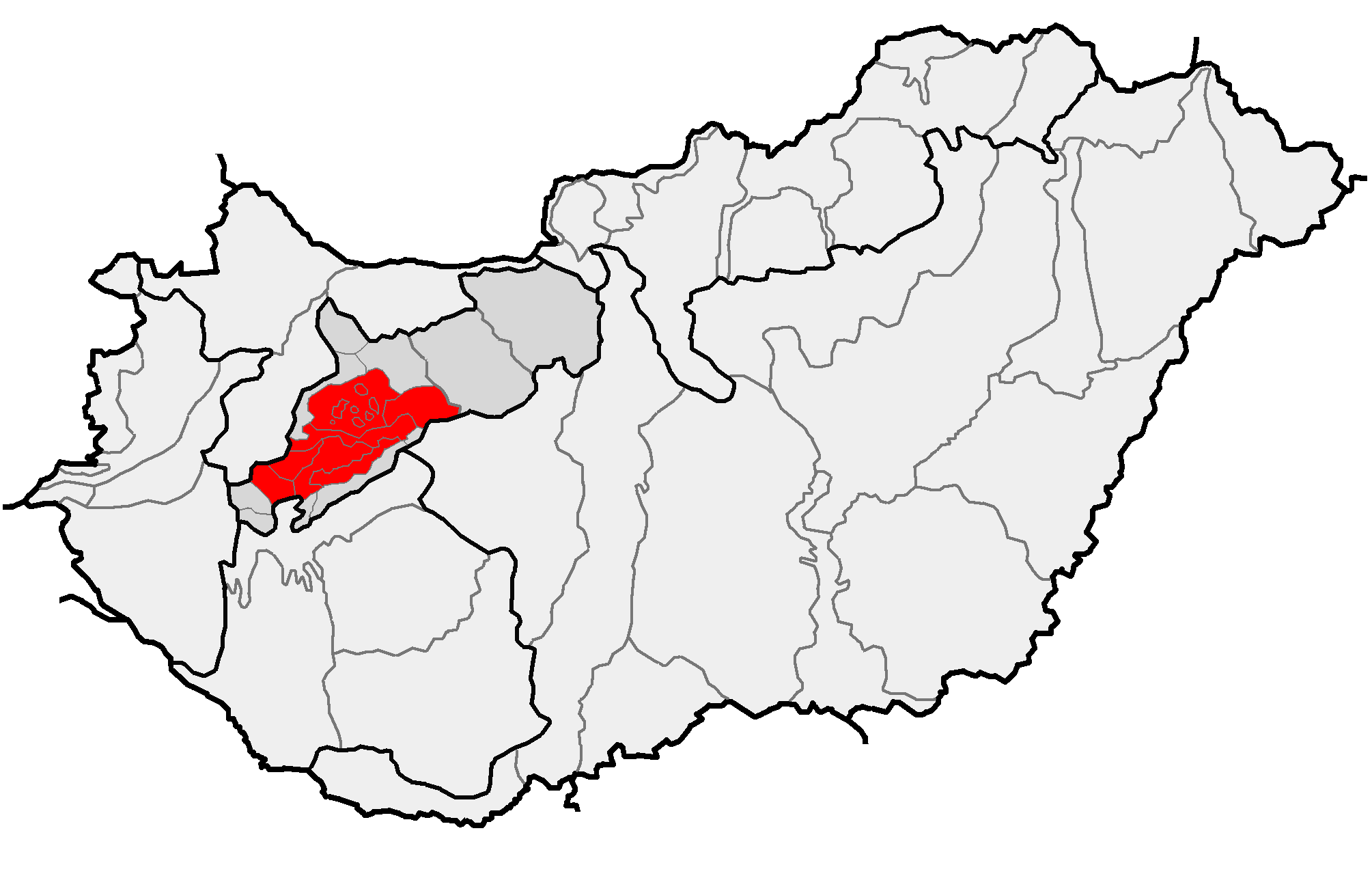
Location of Bakony within physical subdivisions of Hungary

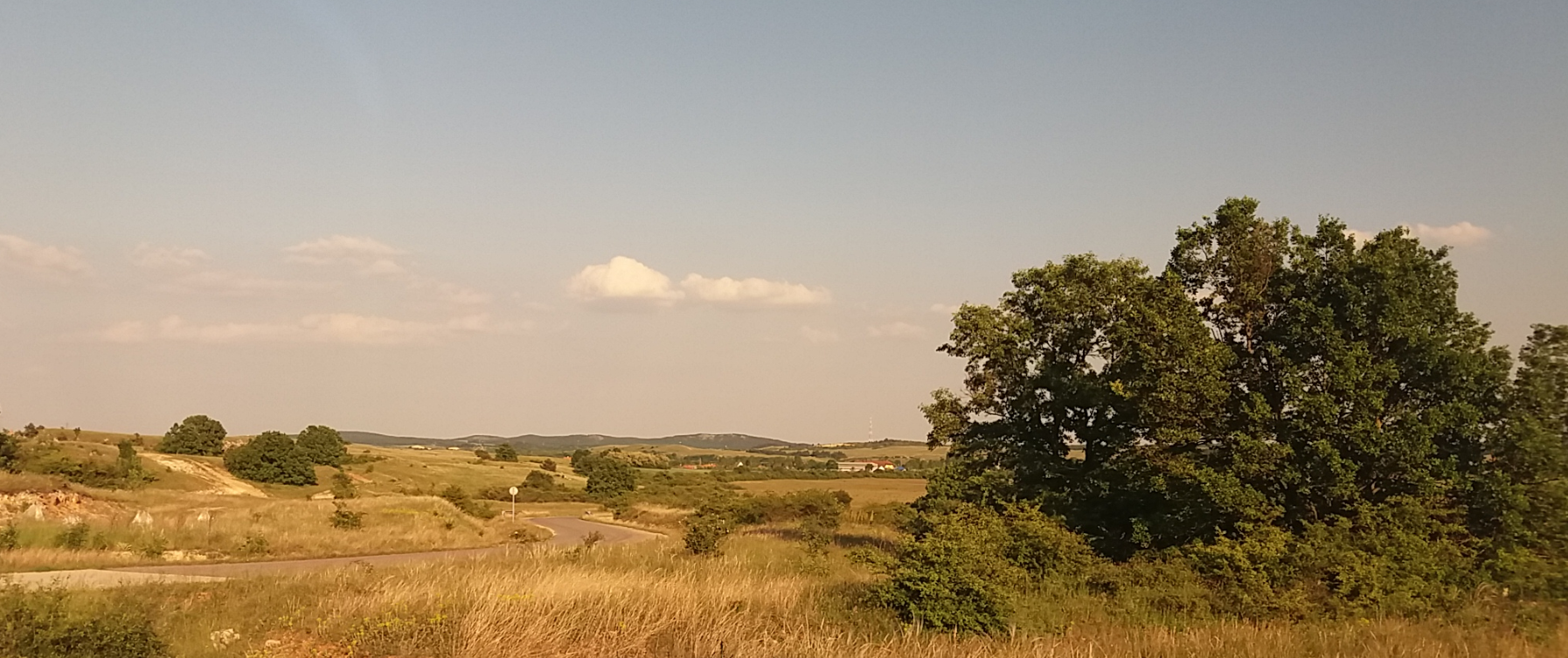
Landscape in the Bakony

Bakony (Hungarian pronunciation: [ˈbɒkoɲ]) is a mountainous region in Transdanubia, Hungary. It forms the largest part of the Transdanubian Mountains. It is located north of Lake Balaton and lies almost entirely in Veszprém county.

The Bakony is divided into the Northern and Southern Bakony through the Várpalota-Veszprém-Ajka-Devecser line. (706 m) high Kőris-hegy in the Northern Bakony is the highest peak of the range. Other high mountains are Som-hegy (649 m), Középső-Hajag (646 m), Öreg-Futóné (576 m) in the Northern Bakony, and Kab-hegy (599 m), Üsti-hegy (536 m) and Agár-tető (511 m) in Southern Bakony.

Zirc is often called the Capital of the Bakony because it is located in the center of the Northern Bakony. The Bakony Museum is located there and introduces visitors to the animals, plants and minerals of the Bakony.

== Gallery ==
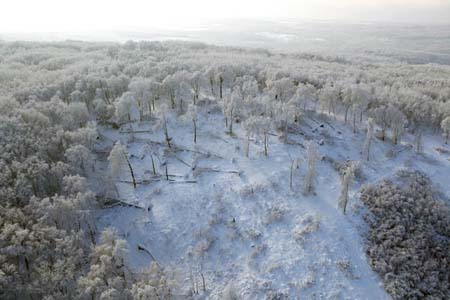
Bakony in winter

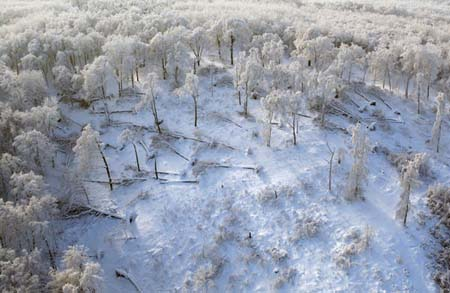

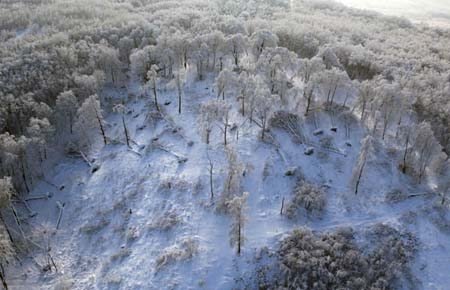

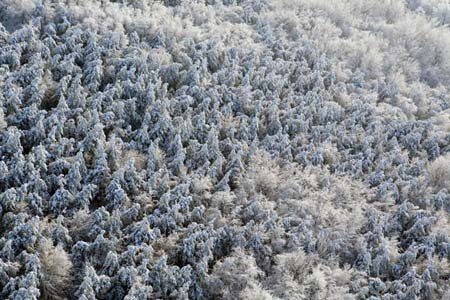

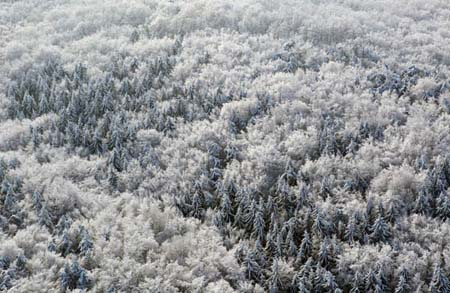

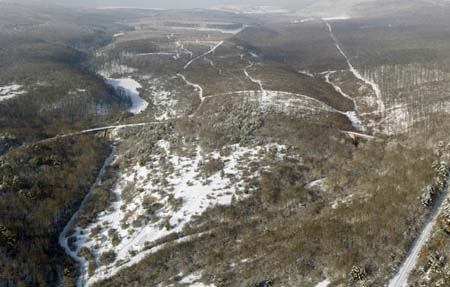
