= Zirc =

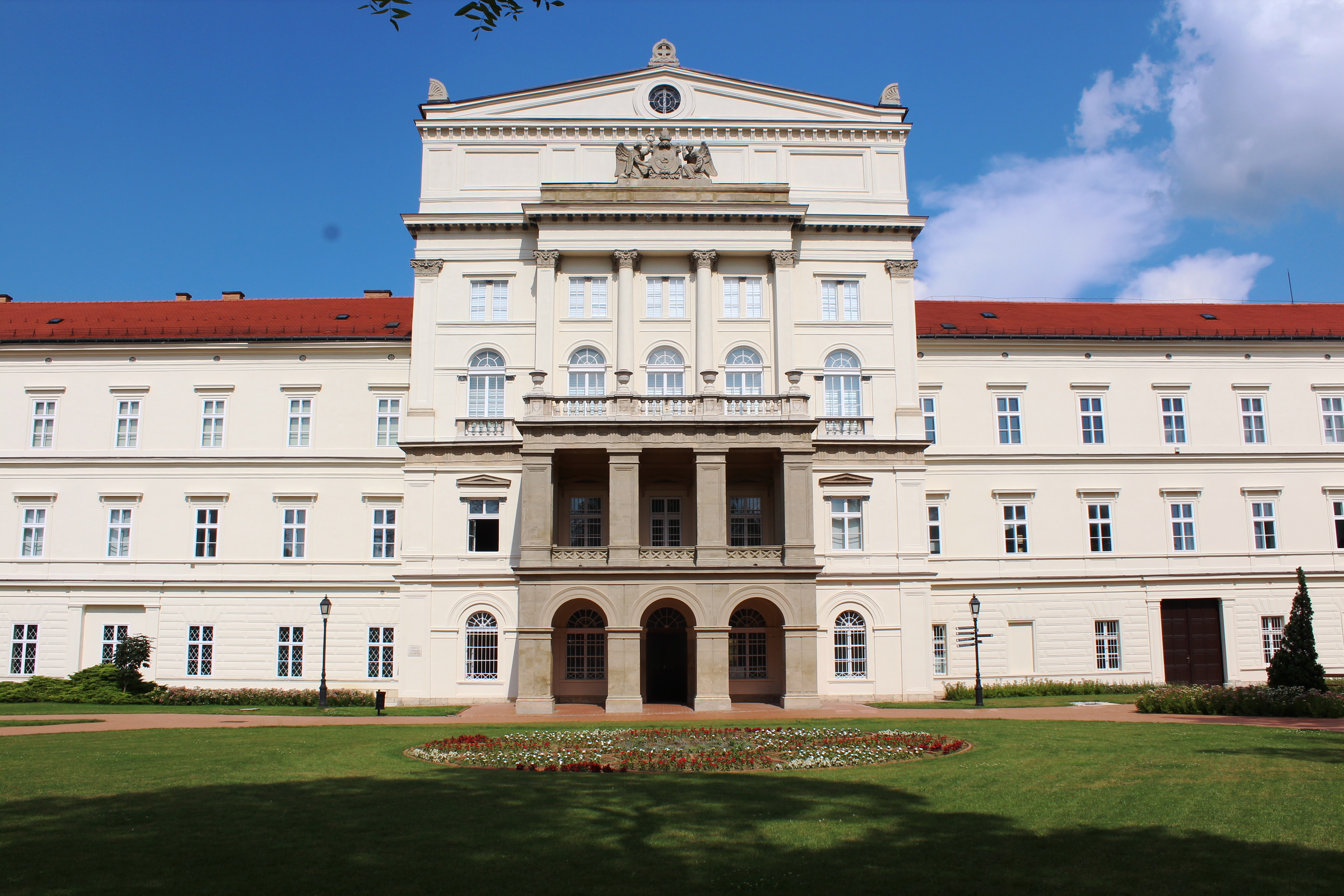
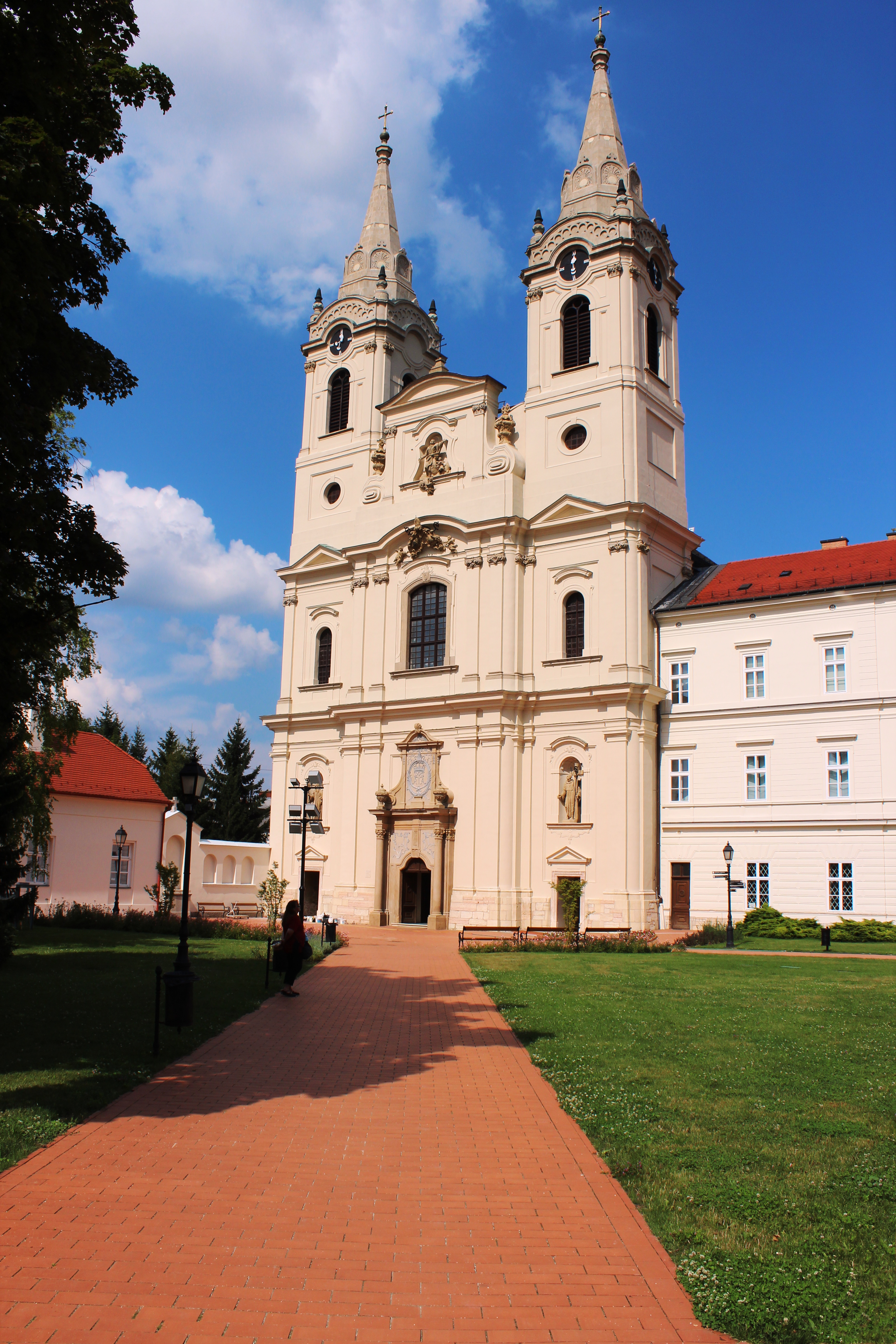
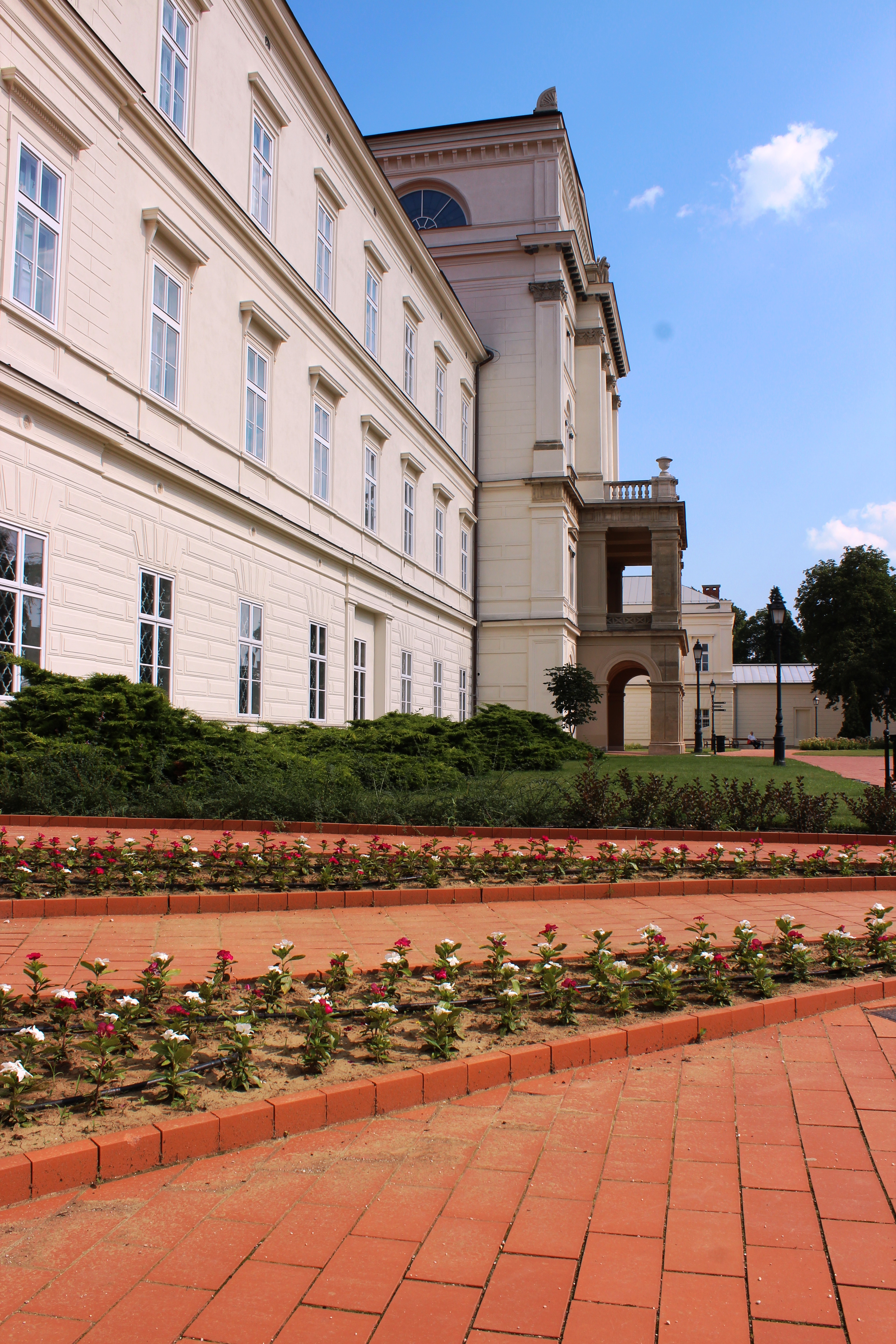
- Cistercian Convent at Zirc

- Flag Coat of arms

- Location of Zirc
- Coordinates: 47.26349°N 17.86928°E
- Country: Hungary
- County: Veszprém

Area
  - Total: 37.4 km^{2} (14.4 sq mi)

Population (2023)
  - Total: 6,552
  - Density: 175.1/km^{2} (454/sq mi)
- Time zone: UTC+1 (CET)
  - Summer (DST): UTC+2 (CEST)
- Postal code: 8420
- Area code: 88
- Website: zirc.hu

Zirc (German: Sirtz) is a town in Veszprém county, Hungary. It is the administrative seat of Zirc District.

At the end of the 19th century and the beginning of the 20th century, Jews lived in Zirc. In 1910, 92 Jews lived in Zirc, Some of them were murdered in the Holocaust.

== Attractions ==
- Zirc Abbey, a Cistercian abbey
  - Bakony Museum of Natural Sciences, situated in the territory of Zirc Abbey
  - Reguly Antal Memorial Library
- Zirc Arboretum
- Reguly Antal Ethnographic Museum and Folk Art Workshop

== Twin towns – sister cities ==
Zirc is twinned with:

- Pohlheim, Germany (1990)
- Baraolt, Romania (1990)
- Nivala, Finland (1998)
- Dertsen, Ukraine (2009)
