= List of populated places in Hungary (K) =

This is a list of cities, towns and villages of Hungary

KEY: T = Town ; V = Village

Name	Rank	County	District	Population	Post code
Kaba	T	Hajdú-Bihar	Püspökladányi	6,422	4183
Kacorlak	V	Zala	Nagykanizsai	237	8773
Kács	V	Borsod-Abaúj-Zemplén	Mezokövesdi	649	3424
Kacsóta	V	Baranya	Szentlorinci	298	7940
Kadarkút	V	Somogy	Kaposvári	2,800	7530
Kajárpéc	V	Gyor-Moson-Sopron	Téti	1,375	9123
Kajászó	V	Fejér	Ercsi	984	2472
Kajdacs	V	Tolna	Paksi	1,361	7051
Kakasd	V	Tolna	Bonyhádi	1,780	7122
Kákics	V	Baranya	Sellyei	225	7958
Kakucs	V	Pest	Dabasi	2,577	2366
Kál	V	Heves	Füzesabonyi	3,484	3350
Kalaznó	V	Tolna	Tamási	210	7194
Káld	V	Vas	Sárvári	1,156	9673
Kálló	V	Nógrád	Pásztói	1,471	2175
Kallósd	V	Zala	Zalaszentgróti	104	8785
Kállósemjén	V	Szabolcs-Szatmár-Bereg	Nagykállói	3,981	4324
Kálmáncsa	V	Somogy	Barcsi	705	7538
Kálmánháza	V	Szabolcs-Szatmár-Bereg	Nyíregyházai	2,109	4434
Kálócfa	V	Zala	Lenti	187	8988
Kalocsa	T	Bács-Kiskun	Kalocsai	18,297	6300
Káloz	V	Fejér	Abai	2,535	8124
Kám	V	Vas	Vasvári	478	9841
Kamond	V	Veszprém	Ajkai	449	8469
Kamut	V	Békés	Békési	1,155	5673
Kánó	V	Borsod-Abaúj-Zemplén	Kazincbarcikai	200	3735
Kántorjánosi	V	Szabolcs-Szatmár-Bereg	Mátészalkai	2,249	4335
Kány	V	Borsod-Abaúj-Zemplén	Encsi	79	3821
Kánya	V	Somogy	Tabi	478	8667
Kányavár	V	Zala	Lenti	154	8956
Kapolcs	V	Veszprém	Tapolcai	451	8294
Kápolna	V	Heves	Füzesabonyi	2,151	3355
Kápolnásnyék	V	Fejér	Gárdonyi	3,290	2475
Kapoly	V	Somogy	Tabi	747	8671
Kaposfo	V	Somogy	Kaposvári	1,820	7523
Kaposgyarmat	V	Somogy	Kaposvári	127	7473
Kaposhomok	V	Somogy	Kaposvári	467	7261
Kaposkeresztúr	V	Somogy	Kaposvári	382	7258
Kaposméro	V	Somogy	Kaposvári	2,563	7521
Kapospula	V	Tolna	Dombóvári	1,023	7251
Kaposújlak	V	Somogy	Kaposvári	667	7522
Kaposvár	county seat	Somogy	Kaposvári	68,090	7400
Kaposszekcso	V	Tolna	Dombóvári	1,368	7361
Kaposszerdahely	V	Somogy	Kaposvári	994	7476
Káptalanfa	V	Veszprém	Sümegi	901	8471
Káptalantóti	V	Veszprém	Tapolcai	410	8283
Kapuvár	T	Gyor-Moson-Sopron	Kapuvári	10,707	9330
Kára	V	Somogy	Tabi	71	7285
Karácsond	V	Heves	Gyöngyösi	3,161	3281
Karád	V	Somogy	Tabi	1,750	8676
Karakó	V	Vas	Celldömölki	237	9547
Karakószörcsök	V	Veszprém	Ajkai	323	8491
Karancsalja	V	Nógrád	Salgótarjáni	1,636	3181
Karancsberény	V	Nógrád	Salgótarjáni	995	3137
Karancskeszi	V	Nógrád	Salgótarjáni	1,949	3183
Karancslapujto	V	Nógrád	Salgótarjáni	2,897	3182
Karancsság	V	Nógrád	Salgótarjáni	1,161	3163
Kárász	V	Baranya	Komlói	397	7333
Karcag	T	Jász-Nagykun-Szolnok	Karcagi	22,579	5300
Karcsa	V	Borsod-Abaúj-Zemplén	Bodrogközi	2,025	3963
Kardos	V	Békés	Szarvasi	774	5552
Kardoskút	V	Békés	Orosházi	982	5945
Karmacs	V	Zala	Keszthely–Hévízi	834	8354
Károlyháza	V	Gyor-Moson-Sopron	Mosonmagyaróvári	518	9182
Karos	V	Borsod-Abaúj-Zemplén	Bodrogközi	485	3962
Kartal	V	Pest	Aszódi	5,857	2173
Kásád	V	Baranya	Siklósi	386	7827
Kaskantyú	V	Bács-Kiskun	Kiskorösi	1,078	6211
Kastélyosdombó	V	Somogy	Barcsi	334	7977
Kaszaper	V	Békés	Mezokovácsházi	2,107	5948
Kaszó	V	Somogy	Nagyatádi	148	7564
Katádfa	V	Baranya	Szigetvári	173	7914
Katafa	V	Vas	Körmendi	400	9915
Kátoly	V	Baranya	Pécsváradi	339	7661
Katymár	V	Bács-Kiskun	Bácsalmási	2,347	6455
Káva	V	Pest	Monori	682	2215
Kávás	V	Zala	Zalaegerszegi	249	8994
Kazár	V	Nógrád	Salgótarjáni	2,138	3127
Kazincbarcika	T	Borsod-Abaúj-Zemplén	Kazincbarcikai	32,442	3700
Kázsmárk	V	Borsod-Abaúj-Zemplén	Szikszói	1,028	3831
Kazsok	V	Somogy	Kaposvári	377	7274
Kecel	T	Bács-Kiskun	Kiskorösi	9,205	6237
Kecskéd	V	Komárom-Esztergom	Oroszlányi	1,927	2852
Kecskemét	county seat	Bács-Kiskun	Kecskeméti	107,604	6000
Kehidakustány	V	Zala	Zalaszentgróti	1,059	8784
Kék	V	Szabolcs-Szatmár-Bereg	Ibrány–Nagyhalászi	2,067	4515
Kékcse	V	Szabolcs-Szatmár-Bereg	Kisvárdai	1,662	4494
Kéked	V	Borsod-Abaúj-Zemplén	Abaúj–Hegyközi	242	3899
Kékesd	V	Baranya	Pécsváradi	215	7661
Kékkút	V	Veszprém	Tapolcai	74	8254
Kelebia	V	Bács-Kiskun	Kiskunhalasi	3,028	6423
Keléd	V	Tolna	Celldömölki	98	9549
Kelemér	V	Borsod-Abaúj-Zemplén	Ózdi	580	3728
Kéleshalom	V	Bács-Kiskun	Jánoshalmi	542	6444
Kelevíz	V	Somogy	Marcali	350	8714
Kemecse	V	Szabolcs-Szatmár-Bereg	Ibrány–Nagyhalászi	5,012	4501
Kemence	V	Pest	Szobi	1,088	2638
Kemendollár	V	Zala	Zalaegerszegi	540	8931
Kemeneshogyész	V	Veszprém	Pápai	590	8516
Kemeneskápolna	V	Vas	Celldömölki	113	9553
Kemenesmagasi	V	Vas	Celldömölki	977	9522
Kemenesmihályfa	V	Vas	Celldömölki	564	9511
Kemenespálfa	V	Vas	Celldömölki	478	9544
Kemenessömjén	V	Vas	Celldömölki	631	9517
Kemenesszentmárton	V	Vas	Celldömölki	239	9521
Kemenesszentpéter	V	Veszprém	Pápai	754	8518
Keménfa	V	Zala	Zalaegerszegi	97	8995
Kémes	V	Baranya	Siklósi	545	7843
Kemestaródfa	V	Tolna	Körmendi	238	9923
Kemse	V	Baranya	Sellyei	72	7839
Kenderes	V	Jász-Nagykun-Szolnok	Karcagi	5,339	5331
Kenéz	V	Tolna	Sárvári	289	9752
Kenézlo	V	Borsod-Abaúj-Zemplén	Sárospataki	1,358	3955
Kengyel	V	Jász-Nagykun-Szolnok	Törökszentmiklósi	4,321	5083
Kenyeri	V	Vas	Celldömölki	943	9514
Kercaszomor	V	Tolna	Oriszentpéteri	228	9945
Kercseliget	V	Somogy	Kaposvári	474	7256
Kerecsend	V	Heves	Egri	2,458	3396
Kerecseny	V	Zala	Nagykanizsai	275	8745
Kerekegyháza	T	Bács-Kiskun	Kecskeméti	6,081	6041
Kereki	V	Somogy	Balatonföldvári	551	8618
Kerékteleki	V	Komárom-Esztergom	Kisbéri	728	2882
Kerepes	V	Pest	Gödölloi	8,781	2144
Keresztéte	V	Borsod-Abaúj-Zemplén	Encsi	33	3821
Kerkabarabás	V	Zala	Lenti	303	8971
Kerkafalva	V	Zala	Lenti	129	8973
Kerkakutas	V	Zala	Lenti	150	8973
Kerkáskápolna	V	Vas	Oriszentpéteri	108	9944
Kerkaszentkirály	V	Zala	Letenyei	278	8874
Kerkateskánd	V	Zala	Lenti	180	8879
Kérsemjén	V	Szabolcs-Szatmár-Bereg	Fehérgyarmati	338	4912
Kerta	V	Veszprém	Ajkai	723	8492
Kertészsziget	V	Békés	Szeghalmi	474	5526
Keszeg	V	Nógrád	Rétsági	697	2616
Kesznyéten	V	Borsod-Abaúj-Zemplén	Tiszaújvárosi	1,898	3579
Keszohidegkút	V	Tolna	Tamási	255	7062
Keszthely	T	Zala	Keszthely–Hévízi	21,803	8360
Kesztölc	V	Komárom-Esztergom	Dorogi	2,605	2517
Keszü	V	Baranya	Pécsi	1,024	7668
Kétbodony	V	Nógrád	Rétsági	526	2655
Kétegyháza	V	Békés	Gyulai	4,464	5741
Kéthely	V	Somogy	Marcali	2,413	8713
Kétpó	V	Jász-Nagykun-Szolnok	Mezotúri	818	5411
Kétsoprony	V	Békés	Békéscsabai	1,581	5674
Kétújfalu	V	Baranya	Szigetvári	721	7975
Kétvölgy	V	Vas	Szentgotthárdi	138	9982
Kéty	V	Tolna	Szekszárdi	769	7174
Kevermes	V	Békés	Mezokovácsházi	2,402	5744
Kilimán	V	Zala	Nagykanizsai	289	8774
Kimle	V	Gyor-Moson-Sopron	Mosonmagyaróvári	2,300	9181
Kincsesbánya	V	Fejér	Móri	1,548	8044
Királd	V	Borsod-Abaúj-Zemplén	Ózdi	952	3657
Királyegyháza	V	Baranya	Szentlorinci	1,048	7953
Királyhegyes	V	Csongrád	Makói	727	6911
Királyszentistván	V	Veszprém	Veszprémi	439	8195
Kisapáti	V	Veszprém	Tapolcai	379	8284
Kisapostag	V	Fejér	Dunaújvárosi	1,259	2428
Kisar	V	Szabolcs-Szatmár-Bereg	Fehérgyarmati	1,123	4921
Kisasszond	V	Somogy	Kaposvári	175	7523
Kisasszonyfa	V	Baranya	Sellyei	228	7954
Kisbabot	V	Gyor-Moson-Sopron	Téti	229	9133
Kisbágyon	V	Nógrád	Pásztói	477	3046
Kisbajcs	V	Gyor-Moson-Sopron	Gyori	758	9062
Kisbajom	V	Somogy	Nagyatádi	455	7542
Kisbárapáti	V	Somogy	Tabi	536	7282
Kisbárkány	V	Nógrád	Bátonyterenyei	250	3075
Kisbér	T	Komárom-Esztergom	Kisbéri	5,874	2870
Kisberény	V	Somogy	Lengyeltóti	219	8693
Kisberzseny	V	Veszprém	Ajkai	99	8477
Kisbeszterce	V	Baranya	Sásdi	100	7391
Kisbodak	V	Gyor-Moson-Sopron	Mosonmagyaróvári	385	9234
Kisbucsa	V	Zala	Zalaegerszegi	476	8925
Kisbudmér	V	Baranya	Mohácsi	145	7756
Kiscsécs	V	Borsod-Abaúj-Zemplén	Tiszaújvárosi	219	3578
Kiscsehi	V	Zala	Letenyei	211	8888
Kiscsosz	V	Veszprém	Ajkai	130	8494
Kisdér	V	Baranya	Siklósi	135	7814
Kisdobsza	V	Baranya	Szigetvári	262	7985
Kisdombegyház	V	Békés	Mezokovácsházi	580	5837
Kisdorog	V	Tolna	Bonyhádi	863	7159
Kisecset	V	Nógrád	Rétsági	208	2655
Kisfalud	V	Gyor-Moson-Sopron	Kapuvári	838	9341
Kisfüzes	V	Heves	Pétervásárai	481	3256
Kisgörbo	V	Zala	Zalaszentgróti	234	8356
Kisgyalán	V	Somogy	Kaposvári	252	7279
Kisgyor	V	Borsod-Abaúj-Zemplén	Miskolci	1,655	3556
Kishajmás	V	Baranya	Sásdi	216	7391
Kisharsány	V	Baranya	Siklósi	568	7800
Kishartyán	V	Nógrád	Salgótarjáni	651	3161
Kisherend	V	Baranya	Pécsi	208	7763
Kishódos	V	Szabolcs-Szatmár-Bereg	Fehérgyarmati	88	4977
Kishuta	V	Borsod-Abaúj-Zemplén	Sátoraljaújhelyi	352	3994
Kisigmánd	V	Komárom-Esztergom	Komáromi	553	2948
Kisjakabfalva	V	Baranya	Siklósi	164	7773
Kiskassa	V	Baranya	Siklósi	286	7766
Kiskinizs	V	Borsod-Abaúj-Zemplén	Szikszói	355	3843
Kiskorpád	V	Somogy	Kaposvári	986	7524
Kisköre	V	Heves	Hevesi	6,842	3384
Kiskorös	T	Bács-Kiskun	Kiskorösi	15,063	6200
Kiskunfélegyháza	T	Bács-Kiskun	Kiskunfélegyházi	31,704	6100
Kiskunhalas	T	Bács-Kiskun	Kiskunhalasi	29,573	6400
Kiskunlacháza	V	Pest	Ráckevei	8,716	2340
Kiskunmajsa	T	Bács-Kiskun	Kiskunmajsai	12,089	6120
Kiskutas	V	Zala	Zalaegerszegi	199	8911
Kisláng	V	Fejér	Enyingi	2,658	8156
Kisléta	V	Szabolcs-Szatmár-Bereg	Nyírbátori	1,950	4325
Kislippó	V	Baranya	Siklósi	327	7775
Kislod	V	Veszprém	Ajkai	1,320	8446
Kismányok	V	Tolna	Bonyhádi	359	7356
Kismarja	V	Hajdú-Bihar	Berettyóújfalui	1,349	4126
Kismaros	V	Pest	Váci	1,871	2623
Kisnamény	V	Szabolcs-Szatmár-Bereg	Fehérgyarmati	341	4737
Kisnána	V	Heves	Gyöngyösi	2,258	3264
Kisnémedi	V	Pest	Váci	702	2165
Kisnyárád	V	Baranya	Mohácsi	249	7759
Kisoroszi	V	Pest	Szentendrei	799	2024
Kispalád	V	Szabolcs-Szatmár-Bereg	Fehérgyarmati	557	4956
Kispáli	V	Zala	Zalaegerszegi	248	8912
Kispirit	V	Veszprém	Ajkai	98	8496
Kisrákos	V	Tolna	Oriszentpéteri	234	9936
Kisrécse	V	Zala	Nagykanizsai	183	8756
Kisrozvágy	V	Borsod-Abaúj-Zemplén	Bodrogközi	213	3965
Kissikátor	V	Borsod-Abaúj-Zemplén	Ózdi	356	3627
Kissomlyó	V	Tolna	Celldömölki	260	9555
Kistamási	V	Baranya	Szigetvári	152	7981
Kistapolca	V	Baranya	Siklósi	221	7823
Kistarcsa	V	Pest	Gödölloi	9,418	2143
Kistelek	T	Csongrád	Kisteleki	7,607	6760
Kistokaj	V	Borsod-Abaúj-Zemplén	Miskolci	1,860	3553
Kistolmács	V	Zala	Letenyei	179	8868
Kistormás	V	Tolna	Szekszárdi	369	7068
Kistótfalu	V	Baranya	Siklósi	334	7768
Kisújszállás	T	Jász-Nagykun-Szolnok	Karcagi	12,741	5310
Kisunyom	V	Vas	Szombathelyi	373	9772
Kisvárda	T	Szabolcs-Szatmár-Bereg	Kisvárdai	18,028	4600
Kisvarsány	V	Szabolcs-Szatmár-Bereg	Vásárosnaményi	982	4811
Kisvásárhely	V	Zala	Zalaszentgróti	61	8341
Kisvaszar	V	Baranya	Sásdi	343	7381
Kisvejke	V	Tolna	Bonyhádi	424	7183
Kiszombor	V	Csongrád	Makói	4,215	6775
Kiszsidány	V	Vas	Koszegi	118	9733
Kisszállás	V	Bács-Kiskun	Kiskunhalasi	2,834	6421
Kisszékely	V	Tolna	Tamási	408	7082
Kisszekeres	V	Szabolcs-Szatmár-Bereg	Fehérgyarmati	601	4963
Kisszentmárton	V	Baranya	Sellyei	307	7841
Kissziget	V	Zala	Lenti	187	8954
Kisszolos	V	Veszprém	Ajkai	133	8483
Klárafalva	V	Csongrád	Makói	510	6773
Kocs	V	Komárom-Esztergom	Tatai	2,718	2898
Kocsér	V	Pest	Ceglédi	2,057	2755
Kocsola	V	Tolna	Dombóvári	1,434	7212
Kocsord	V	Szabolcs-Szatmár-Bereg	Mátészalkai	3,070	4751
Kóka	V	Pest	Nagykátai	4,289	2243
Kokad	V	Hajdú-Bihar	Derecske–Létavértesi	675	4284
Kolontár	V	Veszprém	Ajkai	850	8468
Komádi	T	Hajdú-Bihar	Berettyóújfalui	6,055	4138
Komárom	T	Komárom-Esztergom	Komáromi	19,641	2900
Komjáti	V	Borsod-Abaúj-Zemplén	Edelényi	335	3765
Komló	T	Baranya	Komlói	27,332	7300
Komlódtótfalu	V	Szabolcs-Szatmár-Bereg	Csengeri	114	4765
Komlósd	V	Somogy	Barcsi	206	7582
Komlóska	V	Borsod-Abaúj-Zemplén	Sárospataki	321	3937
Komoró	V	Szabolcs-Szatmár-Bereg	Kisvárdai	1,415	4622
Kompolt	V	Heves	Füzesabonyi	2,272	3356
Kondó	V	Borsod-Abaúj-Zemplén	Miskolci	648	3775
Kondorfa	V	Vas	Oriszentpéteri	642	9943
Kondoros	V	Békés	Szarvasi	5,917	5553
Kóny	V	Gyor-Moson-Sopron	Csornai	2,671	9144
Konyár	V	Hajdú-Bihar	Derecske–Létavértesi	2,272	4133
Kópháza	V	Gyor-Moson-Sopron	Sopron–Fertodi	1,887	9495
Koppányszántó	V	Tolna	Tamási	427	7094
Korlát	V	Borsod-Abaúj-Zemplén	Abaúj–Hegyközi	315	3886
Koroncó	V	Gyor-Moson-Sopron	Gyori	1,883	9113
Kórós	V	Baranya	Sellyei	238	7841
Kosd	V	Pest	Váci	2,295	2612
Kóspallag	V	Pest	Szobi	807	2625
Kótaj	V	Szabolcs-Szatmár-Bereg	Nyíregyházai	4,570	4482
Kovácshida	V	Baranya	Siklósi	286	7847
Kovácsszénája	V	Baranya	Pécsi	55	7678
Kovácsvágás	V	Borsod-Abaúj-Zemplén	Sátoraljaújhelyi	647	3992
Kozárd	V	Nógrád	Pásztói	186	3053
Kozármisleny	V	Baranya	Pécsi	4,247	7761
Kozmadombja	V	Zala	Lenti	55	8988
Köblény	V	Baranya	Komlói	290	7334
Köcsk	V	Vas	Celldömölki	306	9553
Kökény	V	Baranya	Pécsi	566	7668
Kokút	V	Somogy	Kaposvári	611	7530
Kölcse	V	Szabolcs-Szatmár-Bereg	Fehérgyarmati	1,406	4965
Kölesd	V	Tolna	Szekszárdi	1,670	7052
Kölked	V	Baranya	Mohácsi	1,153	7717
Kömlo	V	Heves	Hevesi	4,922	3372
Kömlod	V	Komárom-Esztergom	Oroszlányi	1,185	2853
Kömöro	V	Szabolcs-Szatmár-Bereg	Fehérgyarmati	602	4943
Kömpöc	V	Bács-Kiskun	Kiskunmajsai	781	6134
Körmend	T	Vas	Körmendi	12,535	9900
Környe	V	Komárom-Esztergom	Tatabányai	4,466	2851
Köröm	V	Borsod-Abaúj-Zemplén	Miskolci	1,244	3577
Koröshegy	V	Somogy	Balatonföldvári	1,698	8617
Körösladány	V	Békés	Szeghalmi	5,086	5516
Körösnagyharsány	V	Békés	Sarkadi	694	5539
Köröstarcsa	V	Békés	Békési	2,842	5622
Koröstetétlen	V	Pest	Ceglédi	906	2745
Körösújfalu	V	Békés	Szeghalmi	705	5536
Körösszakál	V	Hajdú-Bihar	Berettyóújfalui	914	4136
Körösszegapáti	V	Hajdú-Bihar	Berettyóújfalui	1,002	4135
Koszárhegy	V	Fejér	Székesfehérvári	1,370	8152
Koszeg	T	Vas	Koszegi	11,783	9730
Koszegdoroszló	V	Vas	Koszegi	280	9725
Koszegpaty	V	Vas	Koszegi	217	9739
Koszegszerdahely	V	Vas	Koszegi	490	9725
Kötcse	V	Somogy	Balatonföldvári	520	8627
Kötegyán	V	Békés	Sarkadi	1,599	5725
Kotelek	V	Jász-Nagykun-Szolnok	Szolnoki	1,791	5062
Kovágóörs	V	Veszprém	Tapolcai	914	8254
Kovágószolos	V	Baranya	Pécsi	1,343	7673
Kovágótöttös	V	Baranya	Pécsi	314	7675
Kövegy	V	Csongrád	Makói	457	6912
Köveskál	V	Veszprém	Tapolcai	448	8274
Krasznokvajda	V	Borsod-Abaúj-Zemplén	Encsi	524	3821
Kulcs	V	Fejér	Adonyi	1,925	2458
Kunadacs	V	Bács-Kiskun	Kunszentmiklói	1,745	6097
Kunágota	V	Békés	Mezokovácsházi	3,018	5746
Kunbaja	V	Bács-Kiskun	Bácsalmási	1,806	6435
Kunbaracs	V	Bács-Kiskun	Kecskeméti	680	6043
Kuncsorba	V	Jász-Nagykun-Szolnok	Törökszentmiklósi	757	5412
Kunfehértó	V	Bács-Kiskun	Kiskunhalasi	2,265	6413
Kunhegyes	T	Jász-Nagykun-Szolnok	Tiszafüredi	8,506	5340
Kunmadaras	V	Jász-Nagykun-Szolnok	Karcagi	5,850	5321
Kunpeszér	V	Bács-Kiskun	Kunszentmiklói	675	6096
Kunszállás	V	Bács-Kiskun	Kiskunfélegyházi	1,711	6115
Kunszentmárton	T	Jász-Nagykun-Szolnok	Kunszentmártoni	9,637	5440
Kunszentmiklós	T	Bács-Kiskun	Kunszentmiklói	9,088	6090
Kunsziget	V	Gyor-Moson-Sopron	Gyori	1,198	9184
Kup	V	Veszprém	Pápai	460	8595
Kupa	V	Borsod-Abaúj-Zemplén	Szikszói	188	3813
Kurd	V	Tolna	Dombóvári	1,344	7226
Kurityán	V	Borsod-Abaúj-Zemplén	Kazincbarcikai	1,808	3732
Kustánszeg	V	Zala	Zalaegerszegi	573	8919
Kutas	V	Somogy	Nagyatádi	1,567	7541
Kutasó	V	Nógrád	Pásztói	112	3066
Kübekháza	V	Csongrád	Szegedi	1,615	6755
Külsosárd	V	Zala	Lenti	99	8978
Külsovat	V	Veszprém	Pápai	866	9532
Küngös	V	Veszprém	Balatonalmádi	575	8162

== Notes ==
- Cities marked with * have several different post codes, the one here is only the most general one.
