= Celldömölk District =

Celldömölk District Celldömölki járás
- Districts of Hungary
- Coat of arms

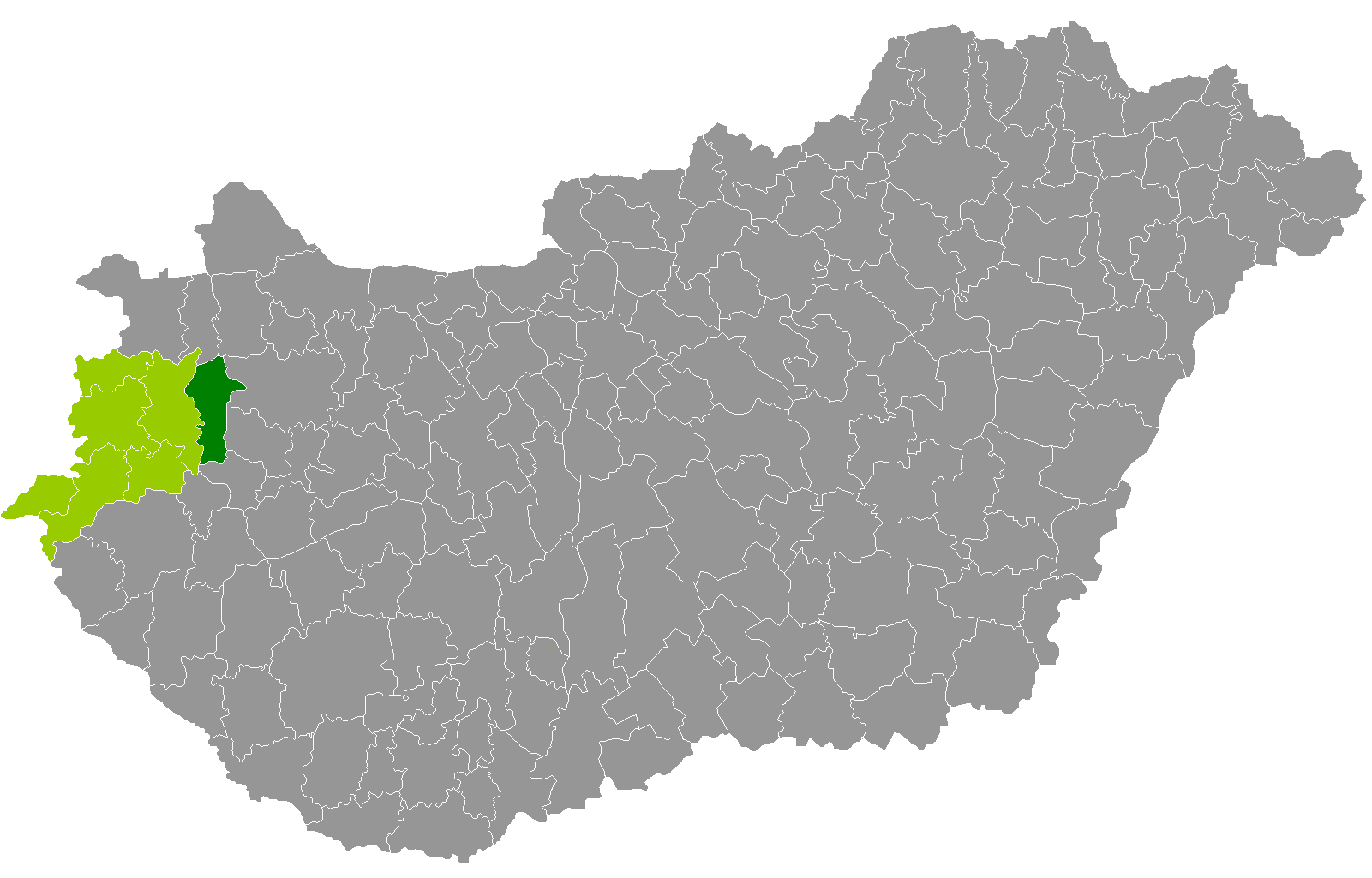
- Celldömölk District within Hungary and Vas County.
- Coordinates: 47.25°N 17.15°E
- Country: Hungary
- County: Vas
- District seat: Celldömölk

Area
  - Total: 474.13 km^{2} (183.06 sq mi)
  - Rank: 4th in Vas

Population (2011 census)
  - Total: 24,630
  - Rank: 5th in Vas
  - Density: 52/km^{2} (130/sq mi)

Celldömölk (Hungarian: Celldömölki járás) is a district in eastern part of Vas County. Celldömölk is also the name of the town where the district seat is found. The district is located in the Western Transdanubia Statistical Region.

== Geography ==
Celldömölk District borders with Kapuvár District and Csorna District (Győr-Moson-Sopron County) to the north, Pápa District and Devecser District (Veszprém County) to the east, Sümeg District (Veszprém County) to the south, Sárvár District to the west. The number of the inhabited places in Celldömölk District is 28.

== Municipalities ==
The district has 2 towns and 26 villages. (population of 1 January 2013)

- Boba (826)
- Borgáta (134)
- **Celldömölk** (11,156) – district seat
- Csönge (382)
- Duka (219)
- Egyházashetye (326)
- **Jánosháza** (2,553)
- Karakó (188)
- Keléd (82)
- Kemeneskápolna (95)
- Kemenesmagasi (826)
- Kemenesmihályfa (492)
- Kemenespálfa (396)
- Kemenessömjén (606)
- Kemenesszentmárton (200)
- Kenyeri (898)
- Kissomlyó (219)
- Köcsk (259)
- Mersevát (598)
- Mesteri (264)
- Nagysimonyi (998)
- Nemeskeresztúr (286)
- Nemeskocs (300)
- Ostffyasszonyfa (797)
- Pápoc (276)
- Szergény (325)
- Tokorcs (347)
- Vönöck (739)

The bolded municipalities are cities.

== Demographics ==
Religion in Celldömölk District (2011 census)
1. Catholic Church (47.5%)
2. Greek Catholicism (0.10%)
3. Lutheranism (22.6%)
4. Calvinism (2.30%)
5. Other religions (0.60%)
6. Non-religious (3.10%)
7. Atheists (0.50%)
8. Undeclared (23.3%)

In 2011, it had a population of 24,630 and the population density was 52/km^{2}.

Year	County population	Change
2011	24,630	n/a

=== Ethnicity ===
Besides the Hungarian majority, the main minorities are the Roma (approx. 400) and German (250).

Total population (2011 census): 24,630
Ethnic groups (2011 census): Identified themselves: 21,954 persons:

- Hungarians: 21,175 (96.45%)
- Gypsies: 372 (1.69%)
- Germans: 247 (1.13%)
- Others and indefinable: 160 (0.73%)

Approx. 3,000 persons in Celldömölk District did not declare their ethnic group at the 2011 census.

=== Religion ===
Religious adherence in the county according to 2011 census:

- Catholic – 11,718 (Roman Catholic – 11,688; Greek Catholic – 24);
- Evangelical – 5,570;
- Reformed – 565;
- other religions – 143;
- Non-religious – 766;
- Atheism – 124;
- Undeclared – 5,744.

== See also ==
- List of cities and towns in Hungary
