= Baranya County 1st constituency =

Constituency in Hungary (2012-)

Coordinates: 46°04′15″N 18°13′59″E

Baranya County 1st constituency (Pécs)
- Constituency for the National Assembly
- Location of Baranya county 01 within Baranya county

- Location of Baranya county within Hungary
- County: Baranya
- Electorate: 70,739 (2026)
- Major settlements: Pécs

Current constituency
- Created: 2011
- Party: Tisza
- Member: Diána Ruzsa
- Elected: 2026

The 1st constituency of Baranya County (Hungarian: Baranya megyei 01. számú országgyűlési egyéni választókerület) is one of the single member constituencies of the National Assembly, the national legislature of Hungary. The constituency standard abbreviation: Baranya 01. OEVK.

Since 2026, it has been represented by Diána Ruzsa of the Tisza party.

== Geography ==
The 1st constituency is located in central part of Baranya County.

=== List of municipalities ===
The constituency includes the following municipalities:

1. Gyód
2. Keszü
3. Kökény
4. Pécs: Inner part and northern and southern suburban part of the city.
5. Pécsudvard
6. Pogány

== Members ==
The constituency was first represented by Péter Csizi of the Fidesz from 2014 to 2018. An Independent politician Tamás Mellár was elected in 2018. After this election he joined the Dialogue for Hungary party and he was re-elected in 2022 (with United for Hungary support). In 2026, Diána Ruzsa of the Tisza party was elected to represent the constituency.

Election	Member	Party	%	Ref.
2014	Péter Csizi	Fidesz	37.19	
2018	Tamás Mellár	Independent (until 2018)	39.26	
2018	Tamás Mellár	Dialogue (from 2018)	39.26	
2022 (Note: Mellár was a member of Dialogue. He ran as a joint candidate of the United for Hungary electoral alliance during the 2022 parliamentary election.)	Tamás Mellár	Dialogue (from 2018)	44.01	
2026	Diána Ruzsa	Tisza	62.97	
