= István Blazsetin =

István Blazsetin may refer to:

- István Blazsetin (1941–2001) (1941–2001), Croatian writer from Hungary
- István Blazsetin (born 1963), Croatian poet and scientist from Hungary
