= Croats of Hungary =

Croats of Hungary Hrvati u Mađarskoj
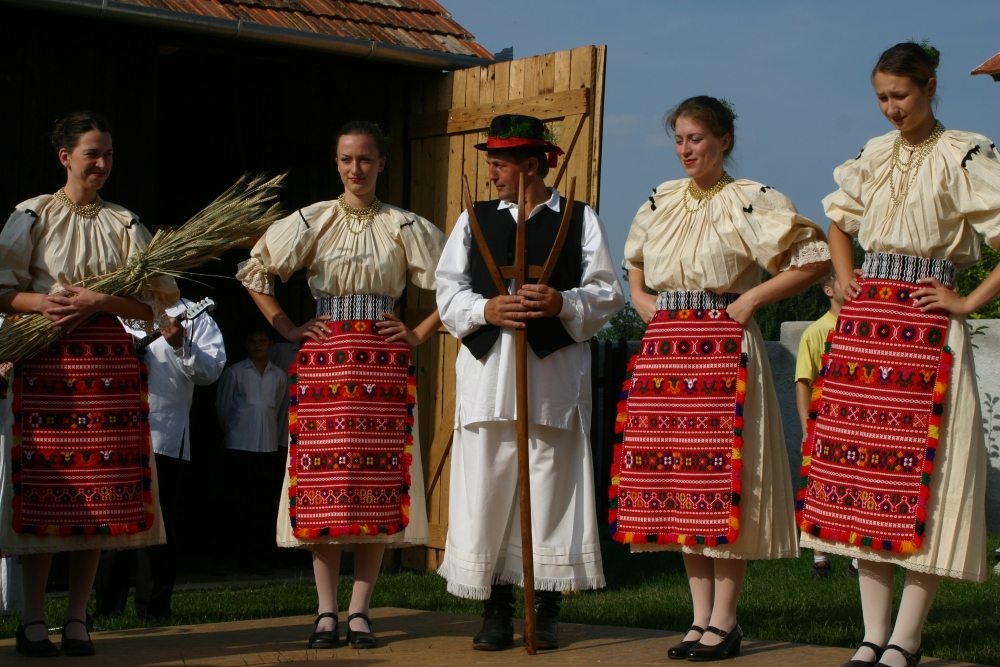
- Croats from Baranya County, Hungary

Total population
- 26,774

Regions with significant populations
- Baranya County: 7,185
- Zala County: 3,770
- Bács-Kiskun County: 3,502
- Vas County: 3,197
- Győr-Moson-Sopron County: 3,028
- Budapest: 2,186
- Somogy County: 1,547
- Pest County: 980
- Csongrád County: 358
- Fejér County: 353
- Tolna County: 178
- Veszprém County: 131

Languages
- Croatian, Hungarian

Religion
- Roman Catholicism

Related ethnic groups
- Croats, Croats of Vojvodina, Burgenland Croats

The Hungarian Croats (Croatian: Hrvati u Mađarskoj; Hungarian: Magyarországi horvátok) are an ethnic minority in Hungary. According to the 2011 census, there were 26,774 Croats in Hungary or 0.3% of population.

Croats of Hungary belong to several ethnographic subgroups. The following groups called themselves through history as Croats: Bunjevci (Danubian Croats), Burgenland Croats, Podravina Croats, Pomurje Croats, Raci Croats, and Šokci. These Croats live along the Croatian-Hungarian border, along the Austrian-Hungarian border, and Serbian-Hungarian border.

== Ethnology ==
Bošnjaci
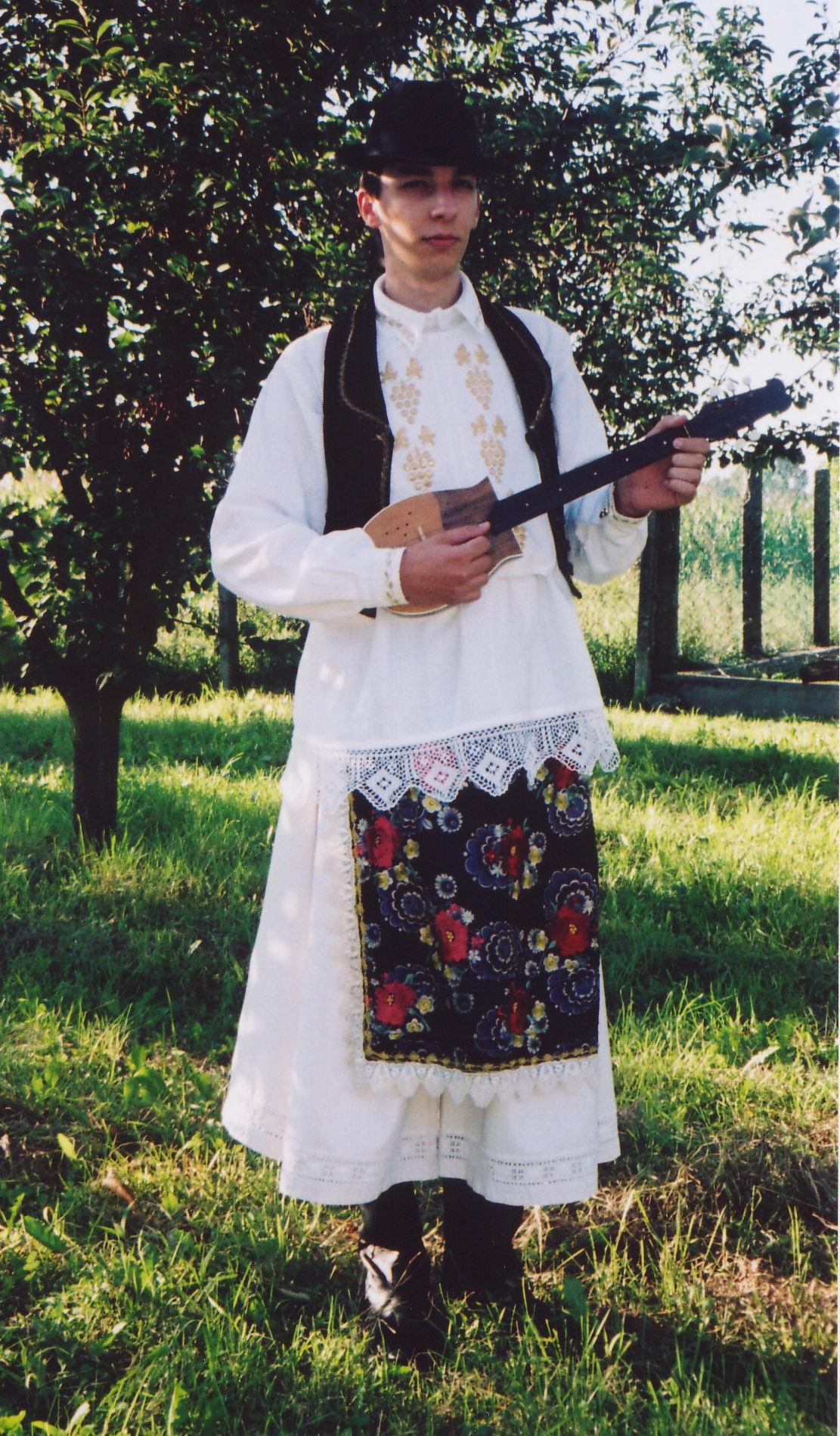
- Bošnjak male from Hungary

Total population
- Croats

Regions with significant populations
- Hungary

Languages
- mostly Croatian

Religion
- Predominantly Roman Catholic

Related ethnic groups
- Croats

The common ethnonym and autonym is horvátok (Croats). In Baranya, there is a community of Croats with Bosnian Catholic origin which is known as bosnyákok (Bosniaks) (Croatian: Bošnjaci, singular Bošnjak; Hungarian: Bosnyákok, in Hungarian literature also Baranyai bosnyákok). They live in Baranya, in the city of Pécs, also in the villages Kökény, Szemely, Udvar, Szalánta (they came there in the 18th century; today they make 32% of the village population), Pécsudvard, Németi, Pogány et cetera. Until recently, Croat Bosniak Catholics were the significant community in Áta, Szőke and Szőkéd, but those Croats have significantly magyarized.

In the village of Hercegszántó there is a community of Šokci (Hungarian: sokácok). In Bács-Kiskun, the community of Bunjevci (Hungarian: bunyevácok) declare as Bunjevci or Croats. Croats immigrated in the Early modern period.

== Geography ==
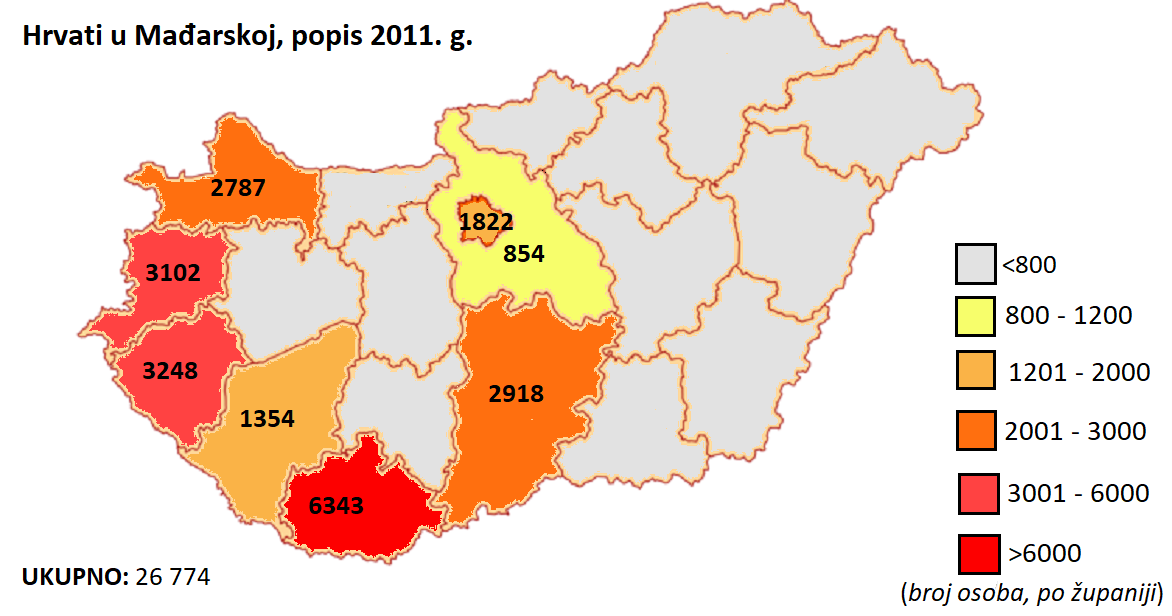
Map of Croats in Hungary

Croat communities are scattered in several parts of Hungary, mostly in the western and southern part of the country, and along the Danube, including Budapest with neighbourhood.

According to 2011 population census, 7,185 Croats live in Baranya County, 3,770 in Zala County, 3,502 in Bács-Kiskun County, 3,197 in Vas County, 3,028 in Győr-Moson-Sopron County, 2,186 in Budapest, 1,547 in Somogy County, 980 in Pest County, 358 in Csongrád-Csanád County, 353 in Fejér County, 178 in Tolna County, and 131 in Veszprém County..

== Cultural institutions ==
- Scientific Institute of Croats of Hungary
- Croat Theatre of Pécs
- Hrvatski glasnik, magazine

Day of Croats of Hungary (Croatian: Dan Hrvata u Mađarskoj) is celebrated on St. Martin's Day (11 November).

== Notable people ==
Notable Hungarian Croats or Hungarians of Croat descent:

- Flórián Albert, footballer (Šokci mother).
- Ivan Antunović (Hungarian: Antunovich János), Catholic bishop (Bunjevci)
- Blanka Bíró, Hungarian handballer
- István Blazsetin (Croatian: Stipan Blažetin)
- István Gyurity (Croatian: Stipan Đurić), Hungarian actor
- György Garics (Croatian: Jurica Garić), Hungarian footballer
- Gyula Lóránt (born Lipovics), Hungarian footballer
- Miklós Páncsics, footballer.
- Petar Pekić (Hungarian: Pékity Péter), Croatian historian (Bunjevci)

== See also ==
- Croatia–Hungary relations
- Croatian diaspora
- List of Croats
- Ethnic groups in Hungary
- Hungarians in Croatia

== Sources and references ==
- (in Croatian) Croatica Kht. Dinko Šokčević: Povijest Hrvata u Mađarskoj
