= Ignjat Granitz =

Croatian businessman

- Born: 1845; Kemenesmagasi, Austrian Empire, (now Hungary)
- Died: 17 December 1908 (aged 62–63); Zagreb, Austro-Hungarian monarchy, (now Croatia)
- Spouse: Paula (née Deutsch) Granitz

Ignjat Granitz (born Ignatz Granitz; 1845 – 17 December 1908) was a Croatian-Jewish industrialist, philanthropist and publisher.

== Early life and family ==
Granitz house

Granitz was born in Kemenesmagasi, Hungary, to a poor peasant Jewish family. In 1864, Granitz finished teacher training college in Győr. He attended rabbinical school in Bratislava, but soon quit the education because of his liberal views. Granitz worked as a teacher in Sárvár, and later in Nagykanizsa. In Nagykanizsa he meet his future wife Paula (née Deutsch), with whom he moved to Zagreb in 1869. In 1870, Granitz married Paula, and together they had four daughters, Olga, Zlata, Štefanija and Janka. Olga and Zlata later married two Jewish brothers, Ernest and Rikard Schulz.

"Granitz house" was a three-story house which was built for the Granitz family in 1886 by architect Hermann Bollé. Granitz and his family were philanthropists as they often aided poor and needy, organizing charity fundraisers. He was an active member of the Israelites Zagreb community. Granitz died on 17 December 1908 in Zagreb and was buried at the Mirogoj Cemetery. His wife died in 1917.

The Granitz family lived in the "Granitz house" until the Nazi occupation of Zagreb and Independent State of Croatia establishment in 1941. Independent State of Croatia regime seized all the assets of the Granitz family, including their house. His daughter Olga (married Schulz) was killed on the street amid Zagreb by unknown Ustaša. Second daughter Zlata (married Schulz) killed herself when Gestapo came for her. Third daughter Štefanija survived the war hiding in Netherlands, and fourth daughter Janka (married Wolf) was arrested by Ustaše and later freed by her son, Pavao Vuk-Pavlović, former students. Granitz's grandchildren, sons-in-law and most family members had been killed during the Holocaust. After the war, in the newly established SFR Yugoslavia, Granitz properties were not returned to the surviving members of his family.

== Career ==
In Zagreb, where he moved from Hungary, Granitz meet his future business partner Lavoslav Hartman. At first, Granitz was employed at Hartman printing office, and in 1878 they established the joint company "Hartman & Granitz". After Hartmans death, Granitz and his new business partner, Vilim Schwartz, paid out the Hartman widow, and in 1882 they formed the new company called "Ignjat Granitz & Comp.". Skillfully using social connections and trading skills, Granitz rapidly expanded his business with new and modern printing machines. In 1883, "Ignjat Granitz & Comp." became the first Croatian printer of school books in the Kingdom of Croatia-Slavonia. "Ignjat Granitz & Comp." also published "Agramer Zeitung", newspapers on German published from 1848 to 1912. Granitz was among the founders of the paper factory "Zagrebačka tvornica papira" in 1895, member of the "Croatian-Slavonian commercial bank", member of the "Commercial Chamber" and one of the founding members of the "Industrialists Union" of Kingdom of Croatia-Slavonia. Later in life, he was named the honorary life Vice President of the "Industrialists Union". He was also the member of the Freemasonry lodge "Ljubav bližnjemu" and the city representative in the Zagreb City Assembly. Granitz was close friend of known Croatian painter and politician, Izidor Kršnjavi. After his death, "Ignjat Granitz & Comp." was merged with the printing house of Ivan Novak, to found the Graphic and Publishing Bureau "Tipografija d.d." which published the papers "Jutarnji list", "Večer", "Obzor" and "Svijet". In 1959, "Tipografija d.d." was merged with "Narodni list", to found the newspaper house "Vjesnik".

== Bibliography ==
- Snješka Knežević, Aleksander Laslo (2011). Židovski Zagreb. Zagreb: AGM, Židovska općina Zagreb. ISBN 978-953-174-393-8.
- Polić, Milan (2001). Život i djelo Pavla Vuk-Pavlovića. Zagreb: Hrvatsko filozofsko društvo. ISBN 953-164-069-6.
