= Diána Ruzsa =

Hungarian politician (born 1979)

Member of the National Assembly
- Assuming office 9 May 2026
- Succeeding: Tamás Mellár
- Constituency: Baranya 1st

Personal details
- Born: 1979 (age 46–47)
- Party: Tisza Party

Diána Ruzsa (born 1979) is a Hungarian politician who was elected member of the National Assembly in 2026. She previously worked as a cardiologist.
