= Egyházashetye =

- Village
- Flag Coat of arms

- Location of Egyházashetye
- Coordinates: 47.16974°N 17.11801°E
- Country: Hungary
- Region: Western Transdanubia
- County: Vas
- District: Celldömölk

Area
  - Total: 13.2 km^{2} (5.1 sq mi)

Population (1 January 2025)
  - Total: 301
  - Density: 22.8/km^{2} (59.1/sq mi)
- Time zone: UTC+1 (CET)
  - Summer (DST): UTC+2 (CEST)
- Postal code: 9554
- Area code: (+36) 95

Egyházashetye is a village in Vas County, Hungary.

== Famous people ==
The poet Dániel Berzsenyi was born there in 1776.
