= Mersevát =

- Village
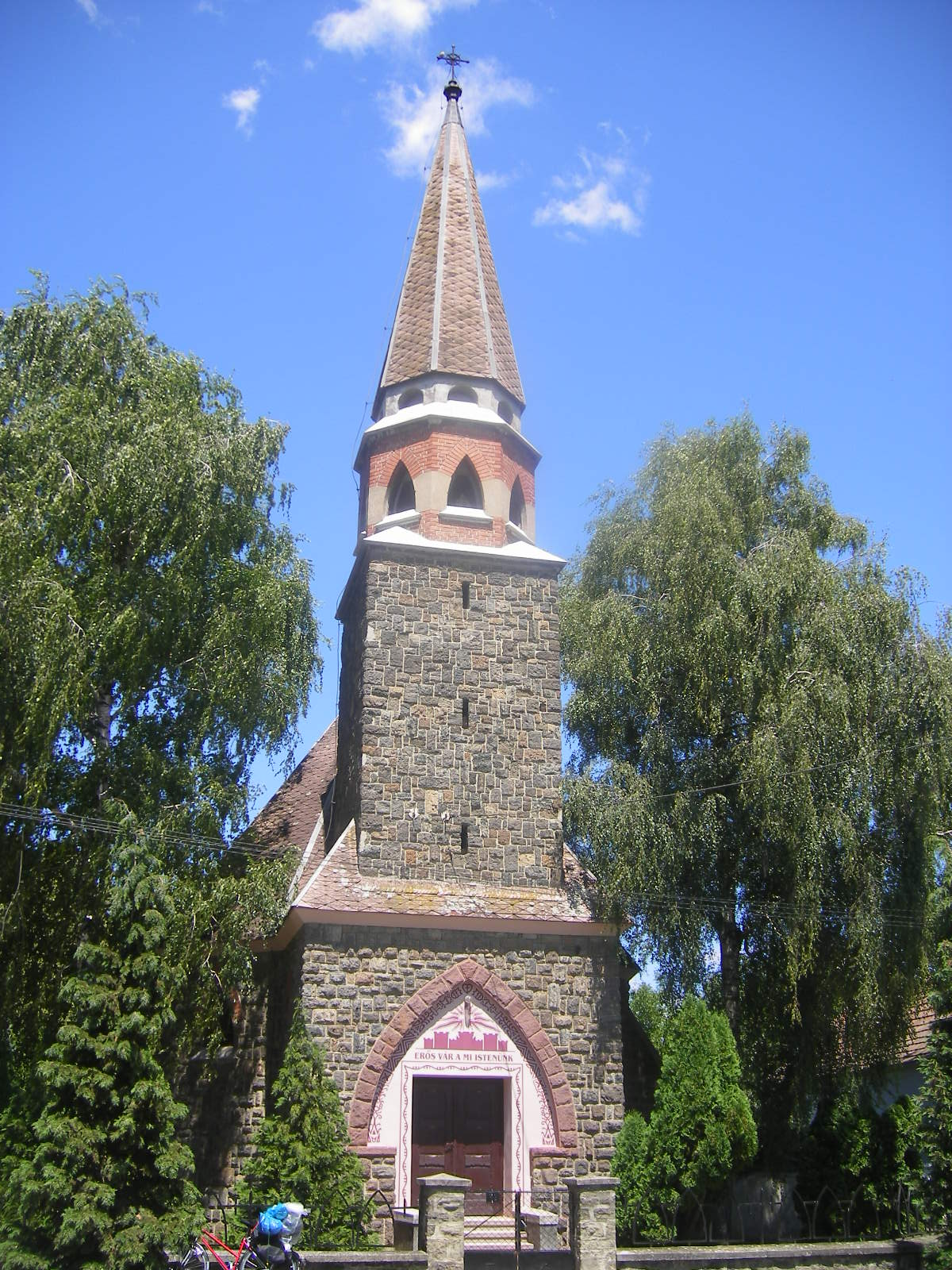

- Flag Coat of arms

- Location of Mersevát
- Coordinates: 47.28910°N 17.20603°E
- Country: Hungary
- Region: Western Transdanubia
- County: Vas
- District: Celldömölk

Area
  - Total: 10.54 km^{2} (4.07 sq mi)

Population (1 January 2026)
  - Total: 570
  - Density: 54/km^{2} (140/sq mi)
- Time zone: UTC+1 (CET)
  - Summer (DST): UTC+2 (CEST)
- Postal code: 9531
- Area code: (+36) 95
- Website: www.mersevat.hu

Mersevát is a village in Vas county, Hungary.

== History ==
Mersevát was created in 1906 with the unification of two small villages, named Merse and Belsővat.

== Notable people ==
- József Tóth (1929–2017), footballer
