= Croat Theatre of Pécs =

Hrvatsko kazalište Pečuh Pécsi Horvát Színház
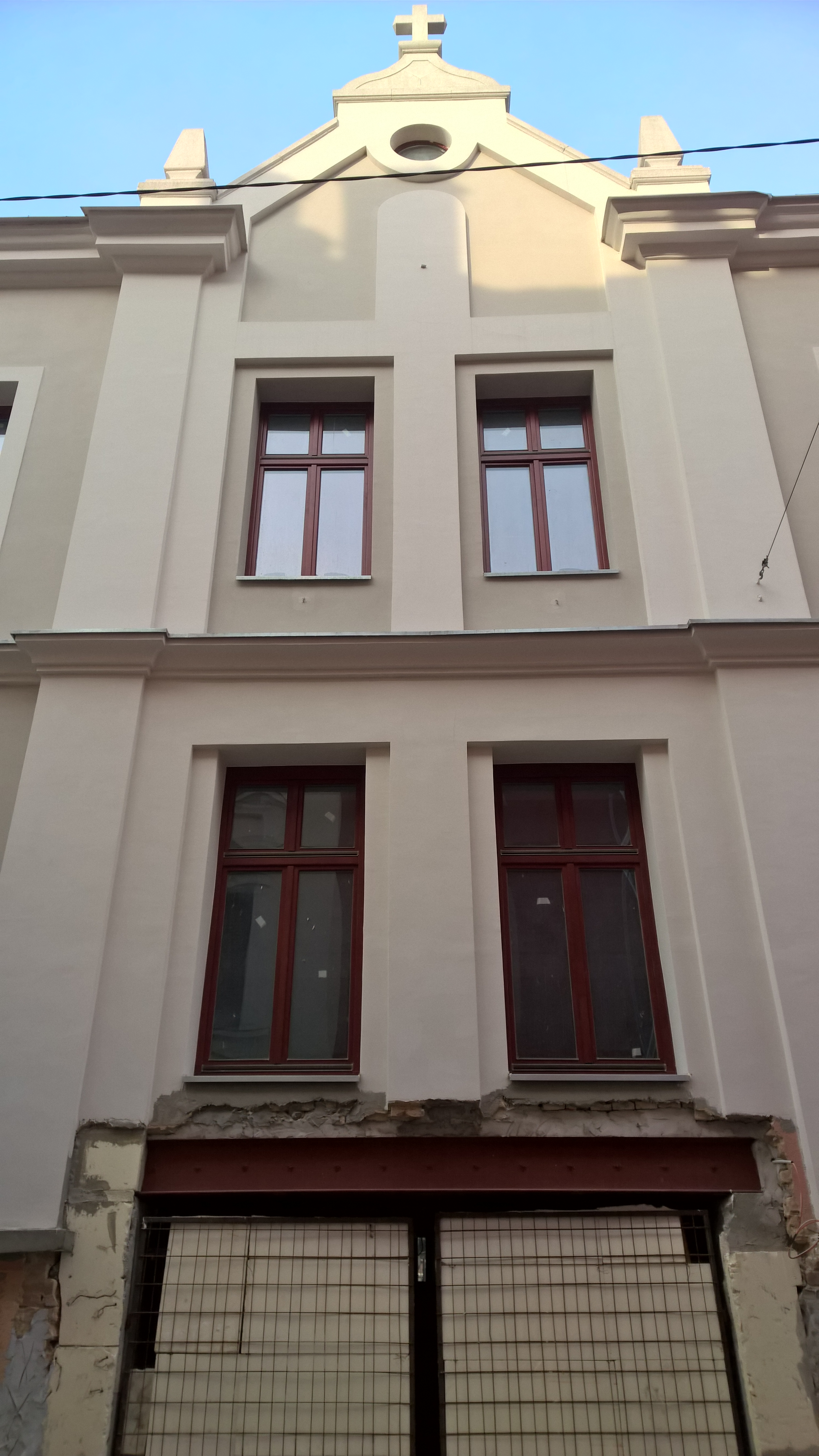
- Interactive map of Hrvatsko kazalište Pečuh; Pécsi Horvát Színház
- Address: Anna utca 17, Pécs
- Location: Pécs, Baranya county, Hungary
- Coordinates: 46°4′39.23″N 18°13′18.11″E
- Type: Theatre

Construction
- Opened: 1998

Website
- Hrvatsko kazalište Pečuh

The Croat Theatre of Pécs (Hungarian: Pécsi Horvát Színház, Croatian: Hrvatsko kazalište Pečuh) is the professional theatre of Croat minority in Pécs, Hungary.

== History ==
The Croat Theatre of Pécs is the first self-initiative institution of Croats in Hungary. It was founded in 1990 by Antun Vidaković, after years of work and organization, with the support of local Croat intellectuals like Ivica Đurok, Mišo Balaž or Đuro Franković, and Magyars like Zoltán Bachmann, János Erdős, or László Bükkösdi. Convincing local and national authorities, support was gathered to fund the mission. The theatre premiered in 1990 with the play Kraljevo by Krleža. Vidaković still manages the institution, which operates as a complete theater since 1998.

== Cast & crew ==
Most of the contributors are Croats, but there are also Magyars.

- Velimir Čokljat
- István Gyurity, actor
- Damir Lončar
- Jozo Matorić
- Vlasta Ramljak
- Slaven Vidaković
- Stjepan Filaković, theatre director
- László Bogassy
- Slaven Vidaković

== Events ==
The theatre organizes summer games since 2002.
