= István Gyurity =

Hungarian actor and singer

- Born: 27 February 1970 (age 55)

István Gyurity (Croatian: Stipan Đurić; born 27 February 1970) is a Hungarian film and stage actor and folk music (starogradske pjesme) singer. He sings mostly traditional folk songs, these include Veselje ti navješćujem and Starogradski splet.

Đurić is the deputy of Hungarian Croat minority (Croatian minority self-government) in Hungary) in Budapest. He lives in Budapest.

== Theatre ==
He is the stage actor of Croat Theatre of Pécs. He also performed in Croatia, in Croatian National Theatre in Osijek, and Theatre Joza Ivakić in Vinkovci and in Hungary, in Operette Theatre in Budapest.

== Singing ==
As a singer he performed on Croatian national TV with Žiga i Bandisti (Glazbeni festival pjesme Podravine i Podravlja in Pitomača in 2009).

== Movies ==
Đurić was an actor in several movies and TV Series. He appears as narrator in Hungarian documentaryVajdasági vérfürdő - 1944 (2004).

== Selected filmography ==
Year	Name	Type	Role
1966	Szamba	movie	
2000	Kisváros	TV series	
2001	Sacra Corona	movie	
2003	Tea	TV series	
2005	Fekete kefe	movie	
2005	Szeress most!	TV series	

== Sources ==
- (in Croatian) Hrvatski glasnik br.47/2005.
- (in Croatian) Vijenac br.365 Trend vesele apokalipse, February 28, 2008
- (in Hungarian) Arcusfest 2009 2009. évi díjazottak
- (in Hungarian) Movie haven – szinkhronhangok Gyurity István
- (in Hungarian) Port.hu Gyurity István
- (in Croatian) Pécsi Horvát Színház – Hrvatsko kazalište Pečuh Stipan Đurić
