= Dragomir Dujmov =

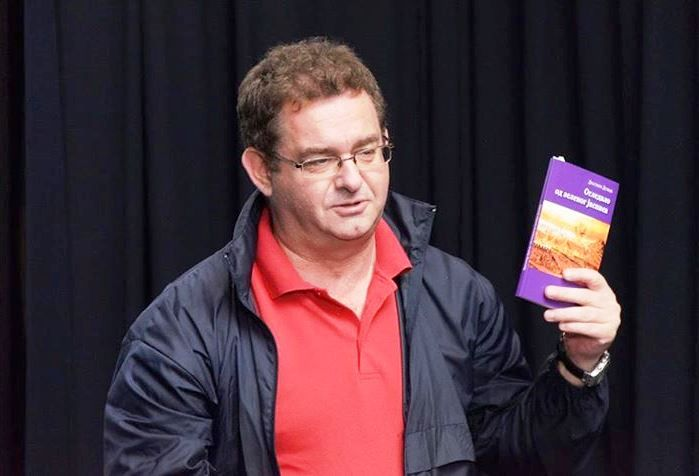

Dragomir Dujmov (Serbian Cyrillic: Драгомир Дујмов, born 17 March 1963) is a Serbian poet, novelist and short story writer from Hungary.

== Biography ==
Dujmov is considered to be one of the leading Serbian poet and writer in Hungary. Dragomir Dujmov was born on March 17, 1963, in Szentes (Hungary). He grew up in a patriotic Serbian family in Katymar near the Serbian-Hungarian border close to the town of Baja. He continued his education in Budapest in the Serbo-Croatian Secondary School. He graduated from the University of Novi Sad's Faculty of Philosophy in 1989.(Serbia). Dujmov is a teacher in Serbian Grammar-school in Budapest.

Dragomir Dujmov started his literary career as a poet. There followed a period in which Dujmov concentrated on the writing of short stories, tales and novels about Serbs in Hungary. In 1992 he published a book of poetry Sunce se nebom bori (Sun fightings with Heaven). His first novel Beli putevi (White Roads) was published in 2000. Dujmov takes his material from the history and life of Serbs in Hungary or Austria-Hungary. The author describes the life of Serbs in Budapest and other places in Hungary.

Dragomir Dujmov elected as a member of Union of Serbian Writers in Belgrade. He received the literature Award of Matica iseljenika Srbije (Belgrade, 2006) and literature Award of Zadužbina "Jakova Ignjatovića" (Budapest, 2004).

== Works ==
=== Poetry ===
- Generacijska antologija, poetry, 1991 (joint edition of two poets, Hungarian Croat poet Stjepan Blažetin and Hungarian Serb poet Dragomir Dujmov; Blažetin's part of the book is titled Krhotine; Dujmov's part is titled Pesme/Pjesme)
- Sunce se nebom bori Sun fightings with Heaven (Budapest, 1992) ISBN 963 04 2419 3
- Nemir boja Restlessness Colours (Budapest, 1997) ISBN 963 8197 08 0
- Meridijani Meridians (Budapest, 2000) ISBN 963 03 9866 4

=== Tales ===
- Zgužvano doba Crumpled Epoch (Budapest, 2001) ISBN 963 008595 X
- Prevoznik tajni Transporter of Secrets (Budapest, 2005) ISBN 963 216 455 5
- Budimske priče Tales from Buda (Budapest, 2007) ISBN 978 963 06 3980 4
- Bajske legende Legends of Baja (Budapest, 2021) ISBN 978 615 01 3336 2

=== Novels ===
- Beli putevi White Roads (Budapest, 2000) ISBN 963 00 5203 2
- Voz savesti Train of Conscience (Budapest, 2005) Award of Matica iseljenika Srbije (Belgrade) ISBN 963 219 449 7
- Voz savesti Train of Conscience (Budapest, 2009) ISBN 978 963 87632 2 8 http://snnovine.com/viewer/2016/24/pdfs/sm01.pdf
- Voz savesti Train of Conscience (Budapest, 2018) ISBN 978 615 81048 0 7
- Raskršće Cross-road (Budapest, 2007) ISBN 963 06 0778 6
- Vreme mesečarenja Time of sleepwalking (Budapest, 2014) ISBN 978 963 08 8670 3
- Ogledalo od zelenog jaspisa The mirror of green jaspis (Budapest, 2015) ISBN 978 963 12 1762 9
- Sablja u jeziku The sword in tongue (Budapest, 2016) ISBN 978 963 12 4766 4
- Jesejevo stablo Tree of Jesse (Budapest, 2017) ISBN 978 963 12 8403 4
- Pod nebom boje purpura Under the purple sky (Budapest, 2018) ISBN 978 615 00 1449 4
- Kad na nebu zacari uštap Time of the full moon (Budapest, 2020) ISBN 978 615 00 9645 2
- Pod senkom budimskog Gerzeleza Under the shadow of Buda's Gellért-hegy (Budapest, 2024) ISBN 978 615 02 0854 1
- Ikona u kori bagrema Icon in acacia bark (Budapest, 2025) ISBN 978 615 02 4537 9

=== Rock-opera ===
- Pastir vukova Shepherd of Wolves - St. Sava - libretto (Budapest, 1994) Serbian Theatre in Budapest

=== Essay ===
- Čuvar peštanskog kandila Patron of lights in Budapest (Budapest, 2005) (Tribute to Stojan D. Vujičić, Serbian writer from Budapest)

=== Scientific work ===
- Zaboravljeni srpski listovi u Budimpešti Forgotten Serbian newspapers in Budapest (Budapest, 2007)
- Santovački letopis sa dopunom Chronicle of Santovo with the additions (Budapest, 2010)
- Hram svetog velikomučenika Georgija u Budimpešti St. George Serbian Orthodox Church in Budapest (Budapest, 2011)
- Budimpeštom srpski znamen Serbian attractions in Budapest (Budapest, 2012)
- Budimpeštom srpski znamen Serbian attractions in Budapest (Budapest, 2017)
- Baranjski glasnik Baranya Messenger (Budapest, 2018)
