= Péter Csizi =

Hungarian politician

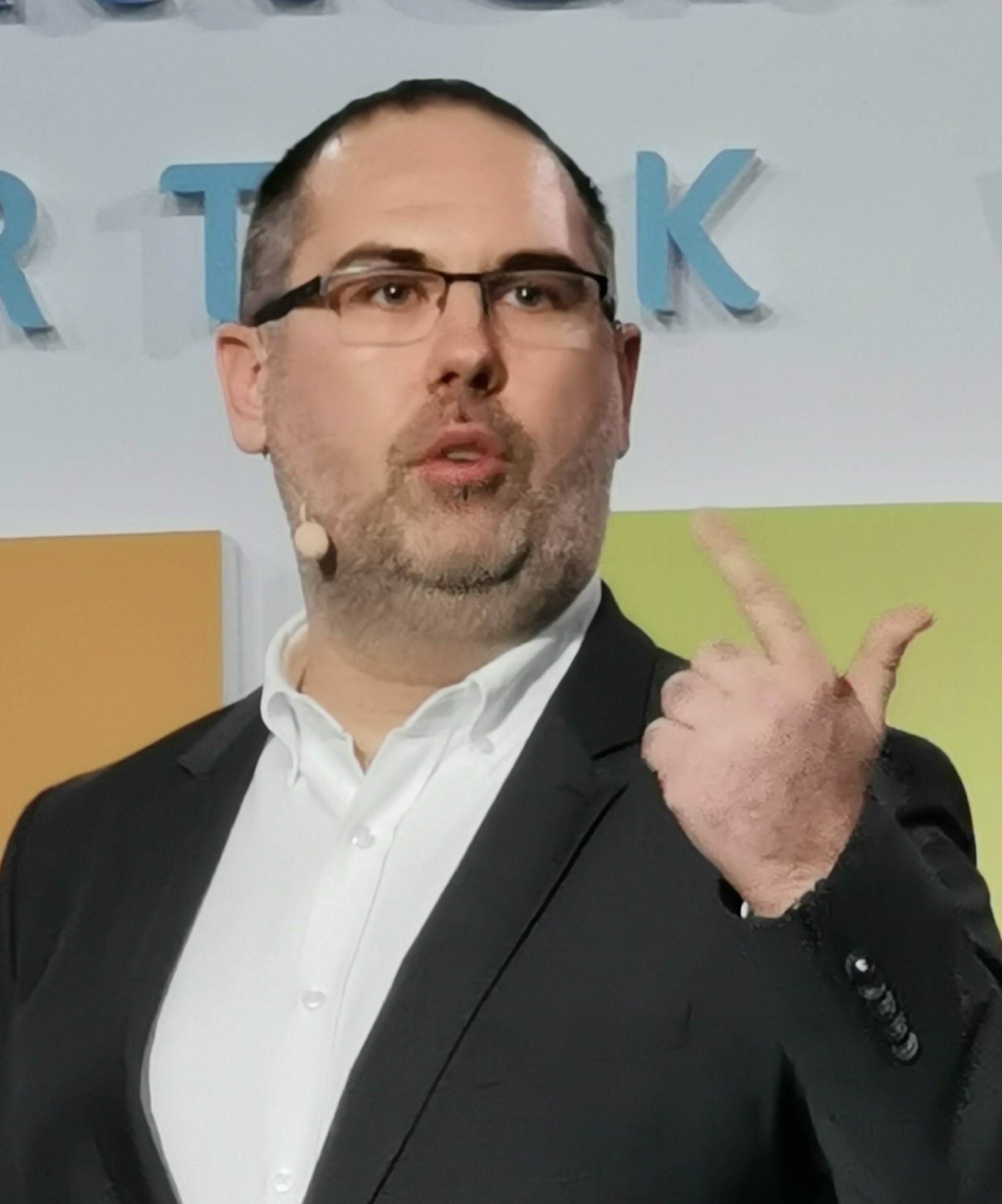
- Péter Csizi

Member of the National Assembly
- In office 14 May 2010 – 7 May 2018

Personal details
- Born: 24 August 1982 (age 43) Pécs, Hungary
- Party: Fidesz
- Spouse: Mária Csiziné Ratár
- Children: Csenge
- Profession: politician

Péter Csizi (born 24 August 1982) is a Hungarian politician, member of the National Assembly (MP) from Baranya County Regional List between 2010 and 2014. He represented Pécs (Baranya County Constituency I) from 2014 to 2018. He was a member of the Committee on Youth, Social, Family, and Housing affairs from 14 May 2010 until 5 May 2014, the Legislative Committee from 6 May 2014 to 16 February 2015, and the National Security Committee from 16 February 2015 to 7 May 2018.

Csizi was appointed chairman of that governing council, which was formed in September 2017 to help the work of Zsolt Páva, the mayor of Pécs. As the city suffers from heavy debts and Páva lost confidence in the Fidesz, the opposition portal Magyar Nemzet considered, Páva was "placed under guardianship" and Csizi became the de facto manager of Pécs.

Csizi was defeated by the independent candidate Tamás Mellár in the 2018 parliamentary election. For a week it seemed, Csizi obtained a mandate from the joint list of Fidesz–KDNP (being the last one), but the governing coalition lost a single seat against Jobbik after processing the votes received from abroad.

== Personal life ==
He is married. His wife is Mária Csiziné Ratár. They have a daughter, Csenge.
