= Szergény =

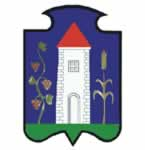
- Coat of arms

- Location of Szergény in Hungary
- Coordinates: 47°19′42.92″N 17°16′6.89″E
- Country: Hungary
- Region: Western Transdanubia
- County: Vas
- Subregion: Celldömölki
- Rank: Village

Area
  - Total: 15.61 km^{2} (6.03 sq mi)

Population (1 January 2008)
  - Total: 344
  - Density: 22.0/km^{2} (57.1/sq mi)
- Time zone: UTC+1 (CET)
  - Summer (DST): UTC+2 (CEST)
- Postal code: 9523
- Area code: +36 95
- KSH code: 27793
- Website: www.szergeny.hu

Szergény is a village in Vas county, Hungary. It is about 84 miles (135 km) west of Budapest. There are a few UNESCO World Heritage sites not far, including the Millenary Benedictine Abbey of Pannonhalma which is about 29 miles (46 km) away.
