= István Blazsetin (born 1963) =

Croatian writer and historian

Blazsetin István (Croatian: Stjepan Blažetin) (Nagykanizsa, Hungary, January 7, 1963) is a Croatian poet, literature critic, literature historian and literature theorist, translator and anthologist from Hungary. He translates literary works from Hungarian to Croatian.

== Biography ==
Stjepan Blažetin is the son of the Croatian poet from Hungary, Stipan Blažetin. Since government policy at the time of Stjepan's birth allowed only Hungarian names and prohibited Croatian names, both of them have the first name "István" in official documents.

Currently Stjepan Blažetin works in the Department of Croatian Studies in the Faculty of Philosophy (Faculty of Humanities, part of University of Pécs) in Pécs. Blažetin performs the duty of scientific secretary of Scientific Institute of Croats of Hungary.

He has participated in the international scientific meeting Riječki filološki dani with the topics Hungarian anthologies of Croatian poetry from WWII until today and Ranko Marinković's Kiklop in Hungarian.

He's a contributor to the Croatian minority self-government annual magazine from Budapest Hrvatski kalendar.

He began writing poetry in 1991. His first published work also included poems written by the Hungarian Serb Dragomir Dujmov.

According to literature critics, with the works of Stjepan Blažetin the poetry in Croatian of Hungarian Croats has entered the postmodern era. Blažetin's poetry is influenced by the poetry of Joja Ricov.

== Works ==
- Generacijska antologija, poetry, 1991 (joint edition of two poets, Hungarian Croat poet Stjepan Blažetin and Hungarian Serb poet Dragomir Dujmov; Blažetin's part of the book is titled Krhotine; Dujmov's part is titled Pesme/Pjesme)
- Porcija besmisla zb(i)rka (first time presented on the Days of Balint Vujkov in 2003),
- Književnost Hrvata u Mađarskoj od 1918. do danas, 1998, (winner of Matica hrvatska award Srebrna povelja in 2000)
- Rasuto biserje, anthology of Croatian poetry in Hungary 1945–2000, (editor)
- Dječja književnost Hrvata u Mađarskoj od 1945. do danas, 2000
- Mala antologija dječje poezije iz Mađarske, 2000

Blažetin translated from Hungarian into Croatian Paklene priče of Tvrtko Vujić and the works of Miklos Radnoti.

== Sources ==
- Vjesnik Društveni i politički život Hrvata u Mađarskoj, 2000.
