= Pogány =

- Village (Falva)
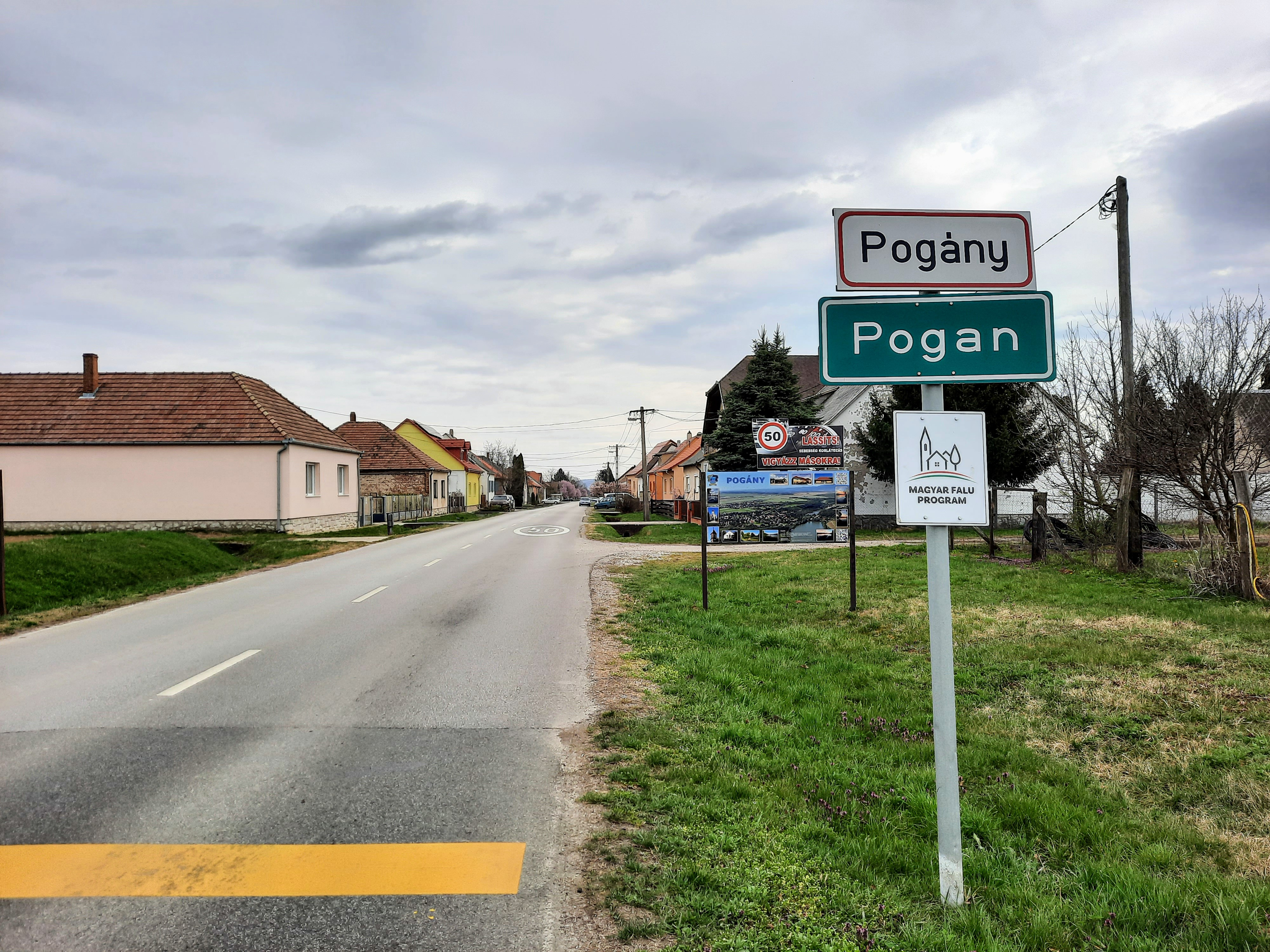
- Pécsi street in Pogány

- Coat of arms

- Location of Pogány
- Coordinates: 45.98214°N 18.25623°E
- Country: Hungary
- County: Baranya

Area
  - Total: 11.55 km^{2} (4.46 sq mi)

Population (2018)
  - Total: 1,299
  - Density: 94.89/km^{2} (245.8/sq mi)
- Time zone: UTC+1 (CET)
  - Summer (DST): UTC+2 (CEST)
- Postal code: 7666
- Area code: 72
- Website: http://www.pogany.hu/

Pogány (Croatian: Pogan) is a village in Baranya county, Hungary.

== Location ==
Pogány is located south of Pécs, near Hungary's Highway 58.

== History ==
The first written record of Pogány dates to 1181, with the village's church to St. Barbara appearing as early as 1334. During the Ottoman occupation of Hungary, the village was depopulated, but slowly regained population.

In the 18th century, Serbs and Croats settled in the village, but the Serbs quickly left. In 1845, a school was built in the village.

== Demographics ==
As of the 2011 census, 90.1% of the population was Hungarian, 15.1% German, 10.4% Croatian, and 1.3% Gypsy. The villagers were 39.8% Roman Catholic, 10.7% Reformed, 3.2% Lutheran, 1.1% Greek Catholic, and 22.2% non-denominational (20.8% did not declare their religion).
