= Tamás Mellár =

Hungarian economist, statistician, professor and politician

Mellár Tamás
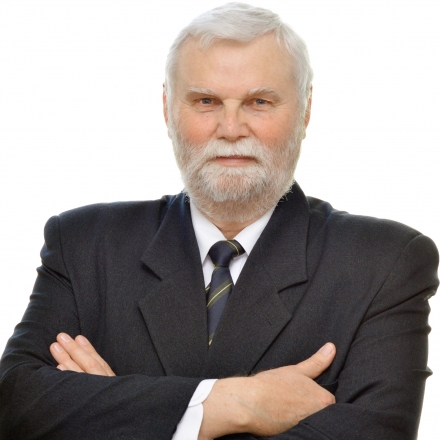

Member of the National Assembly of Hungary for Baranya 01. OEVK
- In office 19 May 2018 – 8 May 2026

Personal details
- Born: 18 March 1954 (age 72) Alsónyék, Hungary
- Citizenship: Hungary
- Party: Independent
- Other political affiliations: Dialogue (2018–)

Tamás Mellár (born 18 March 1954 in Alsónyék, Hungary) is a Hungarian economist, statistician, professor and politician. He was a member of parliament in the National Assembly of Hungary (Országgyűlés) from May 2018 to May 2026.

In August 2025, Mellár announced he would not stand again to help the Tisza Party win.
