= Kisbucsa =

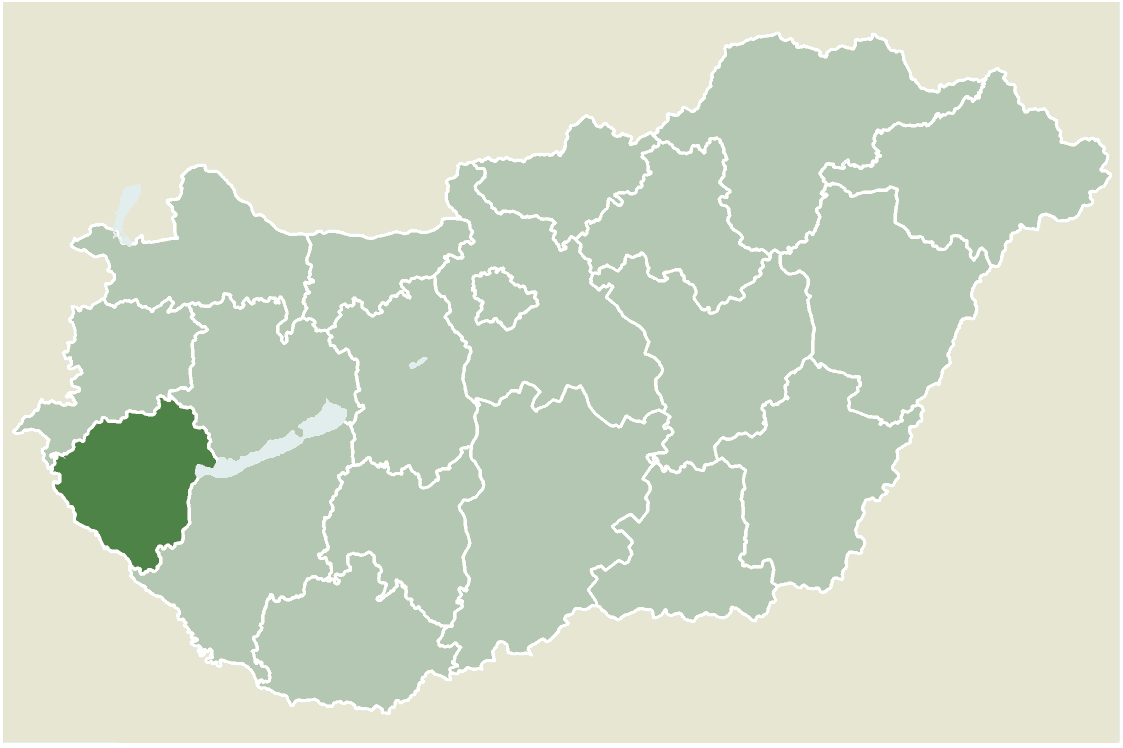
- Location of Zala county in Hungary

- Location of Kisbucsa
- Coordinates: 46.81864°N 16.94144°E
- Country: Hungary
- County: Zala

Area
  - Total: 8.8 km^{2} (3.4 sq mi)

Population (2004)
  - Total: 476
  - Density: 54.09/km^{2} (140.1/sq mi)
- Time zone: UTC+1 (CET)
  - Summer (DST): UTC+2 (CEST)
- Postal code: 8925
- Area code: 92

Kisbucsa is a village in Zala County, Hungary.
