= Alsónyék =

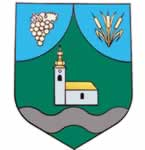
- Coat of arms

- Location of Alsónyék in Hungary
- Coordinates: 46.20279°N 18.73555°E
- Country: Hungary
- Region: Southern Transdanubia
- County: Tolna
- Subregion: Szekszárdi
- Rank: Village

Government
  - Mayor: Dózsa Pál Tibor

Area
  - Total: 32.05 km^{2} (12.37 sq mi)

Population (1 January 2008)
  - Total: 786
  - Density: 24.5/km^{2} (63.5/sq mi)
- Time zone: UTC+1 (CET)
  - Summer (DST): UTC+2 (CEST)
- Postal code: 7148
- Area code: +36 74
- KSH code: 11563
- Website: www.alsonyek.hu

Alsónyék is a village in Tolna County, Hungary.
