= Káptalanfa =

- Flag Coat of arms

- Location of Veszprém county in Hungary

- Location of Káptalanfa
- Coordinates: 47.06410°N 17.34467°E
- Country: Hungary
- County: Veszprém

Area
  - Total: 33.71 km^{2} (13.02 sq mi)

Population (2004)
  - Total: 906
  - Density: 26.87/km^{2} (69.6/sq mi)
- Time zone: UTC+1 (CET)
  - Summer (DST): UTC+2 (CEST)
- Postal code: 8471
- Area code: 87

Káptalanfa is a village in Veszprém county, Hungary.

Like all the surrounding villages, Káptalanfa also hold their own 'Village Day'. It contains horse riding, food cooking- and football competitions between local teams. The day ends with a dance.
