= Nemeskeresztúr =

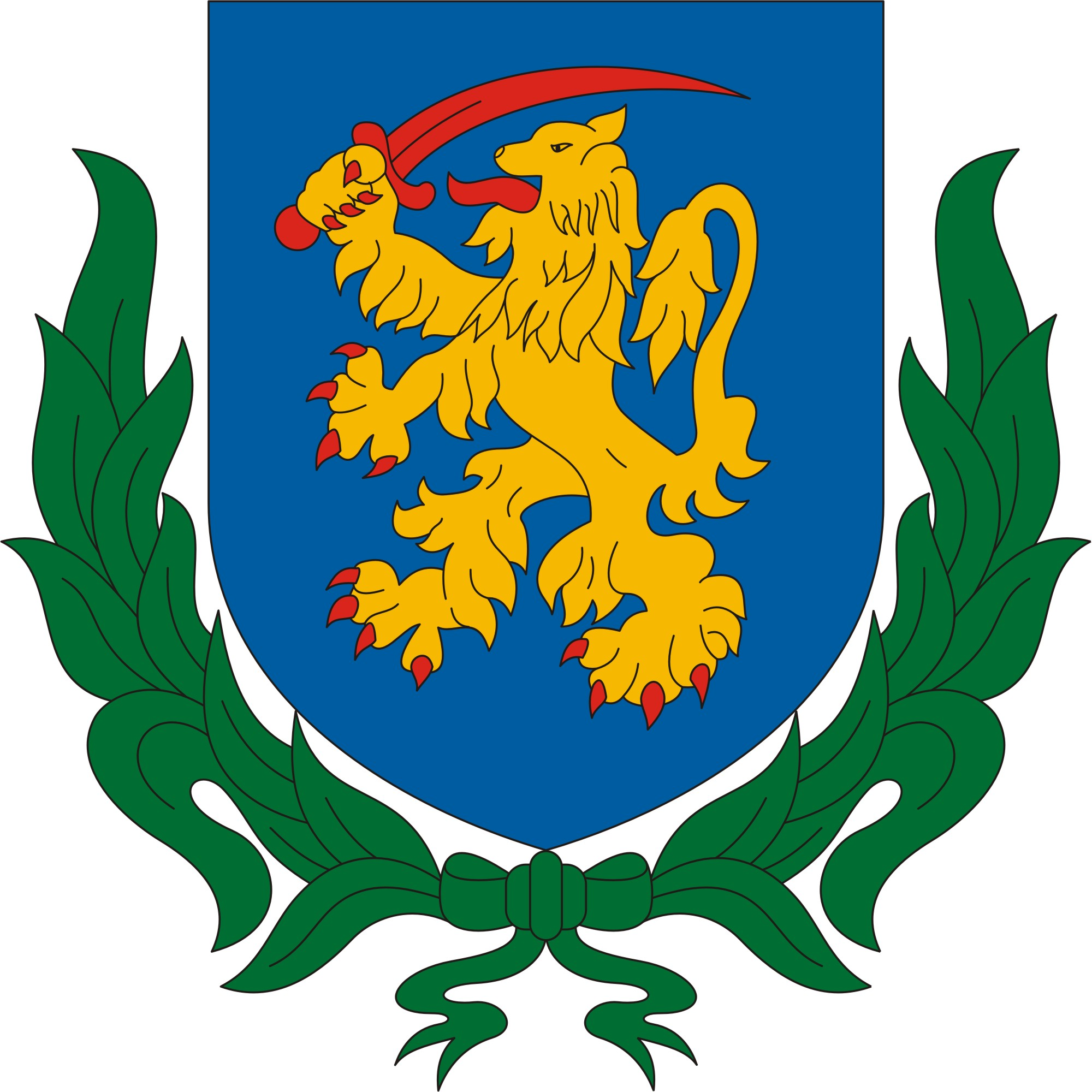
- Coat of arms

- Location of Nemeskeresztúr in Hungary
- Coordinates: 47.09313°N 17.19545°E
- Country: Hungary
- Region: Western Transdanubia
- County: Vas
- Subregion: Celldömölki
- Rank: Village

Area
  - Total: 12.17 km^{2} (4.70 sq mi)

Population (1 January 2008)
  - Total: 285
  - Density: 23.4/km^{2} (60.7/sq mi)
- Time zone: UTC+1 (CET)
  - Summer (DST): UTC+2 (CEST)
- Postal code: 9548
- Area code: +36 95
- KSH code: 03674
- Website: https://nemeskeresztur.gportal.hu/

Nemeskeresztúr is a village in Vas county, Hungary.
