= Kacorlak =

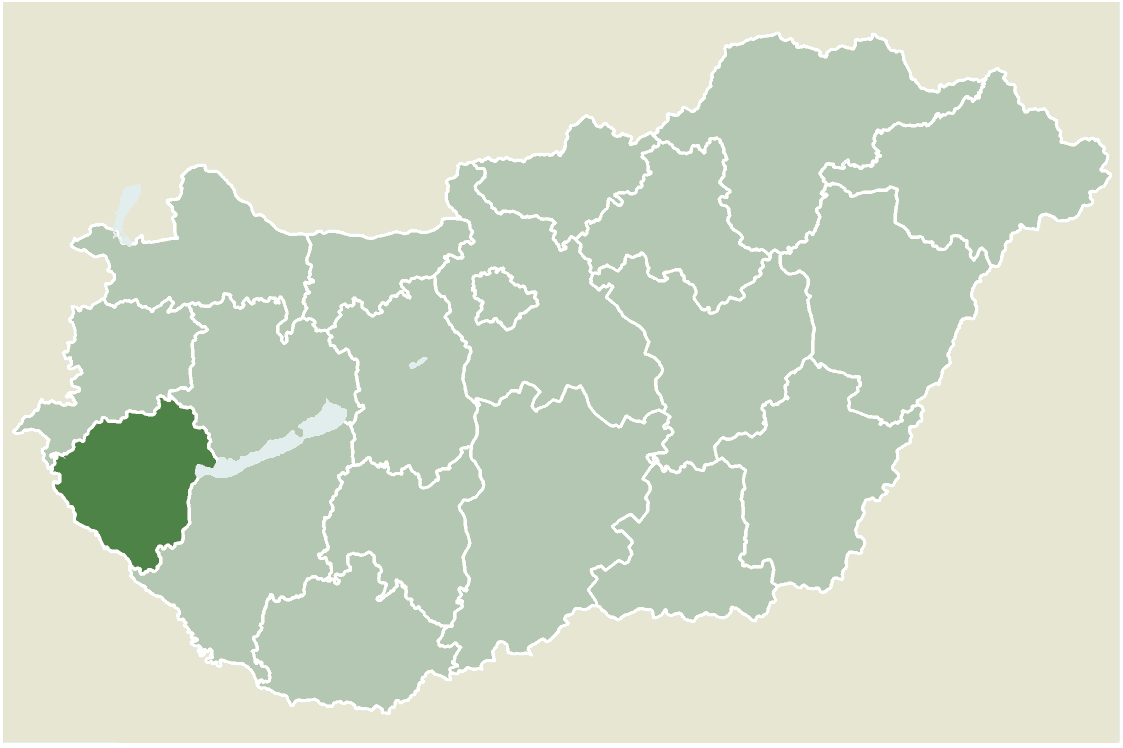
- Location of Zala county in Hungary

- Location of Kacorlak
- Coordinates: 46.57436°N 16.95149°E
- Country: Hungary
- County: Zala

Area
  - Total: 7.6 km^{2} (2.9 sq mi)

Population (2004)
  - Total: 234
  - Density: 30.78/km^{2} (79.7/sq mi)
- Time zone: UTC+1 (CET)
  - Summer (DST): UTC+2 (CEST)
- Postal code: 8773
- Area code: 93

Kacorlak is a village in Zala County, Hungary.
