= Nagysimonyi =

- Coat of arms

- Location of Nagysimonyi in Hungary
- Coordinates: 47°15′49″N 17°03′50″E
- Country: Hungary
- Region: Western Transdanubia
- County: Vas
- Subregion: Celldömölki
- Rank: Village

Area
  - Total: 15.67 km^{2} (6.05 sq mi)

Population (1 January 2008)
  - Total: 976
  - Density: 62.3/km^{2} (161/sq mi)
- Time zone: UTC+1 (CET)
  - Summer (DST): UTC+2 (CEST)
- Postal code: 9561
- Area code: +36 95
- KSH code: 26143
- Website: http://nagysimonyi.hu/

Nagysimonyi is a village in Vas county, Hungary.
