= Kisapáti =

- Location of Veszprém county in Hungary

- Location of Kisapáti
- Coordinates: 46.84459°N 17.46808°E
- Country: Hungary
- County: Veszprém

Government
  - Mayor: Bicskei Sándor (Ind.)

Area
  - Total: 6.89 km^{2} (2.66 sq mi)

Population (2022)
  - Total: 328
  - Density: 47.6/km^{2} (123/sq mi)
- Time zone: UTC+1 (CET)
  - Summer (DST): UTC+2 (CEST)
- Postal code: 8284
- Area code: 87

Kisapáti is a village in Veszprém county, Hungary.
