= Ostffyasszonyfa =

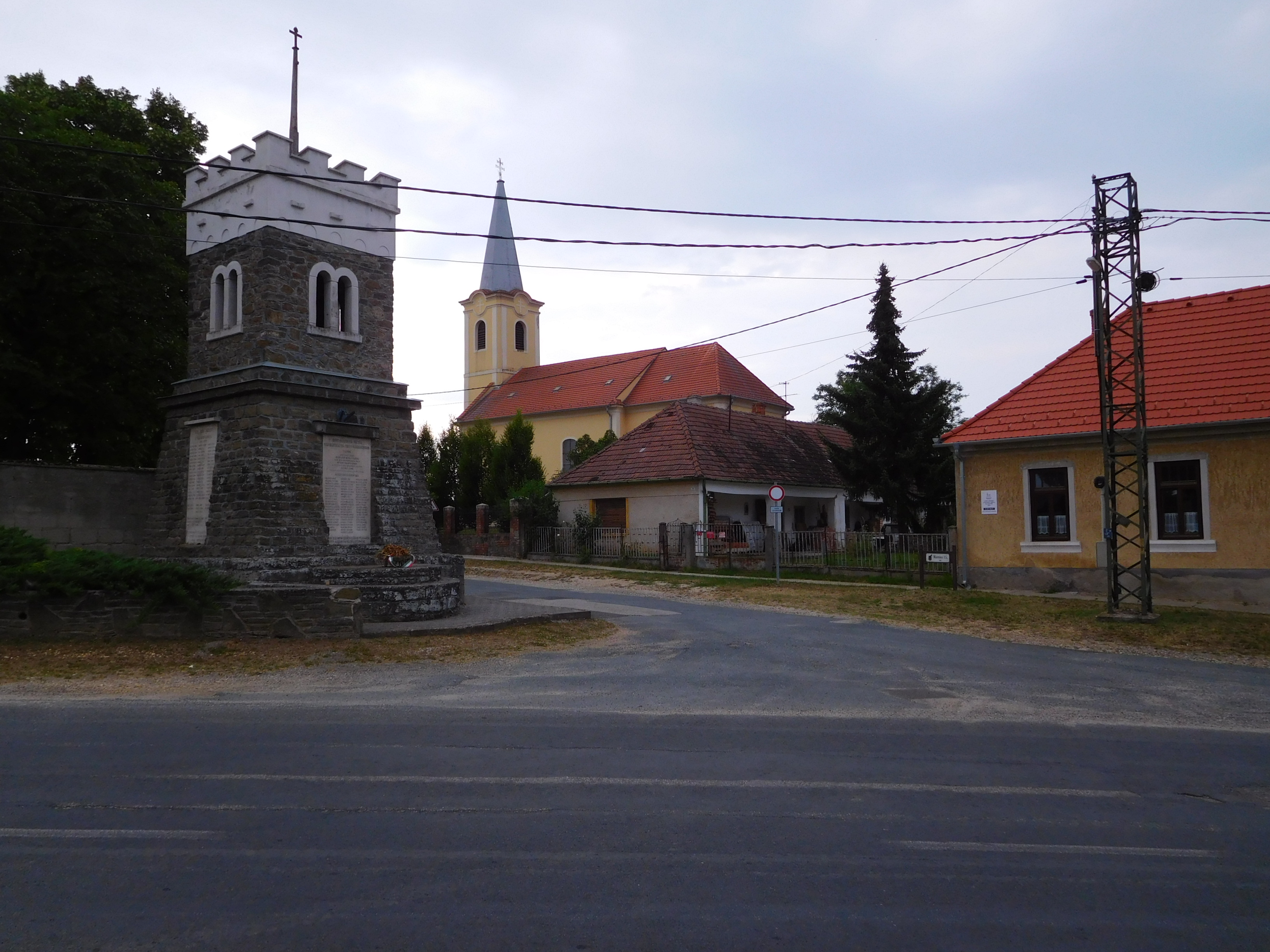
- Ostffyasszonyfa - village center

- Coat of arms

- Location of Vas county in Hungary

- Location of Ostffyasszonyfa
- Coordinates: 47.32894°N 17.04452°E
- Country: Hungary
- County: Vas

Government
  - Mayor: Attila Ács (Independent) 2022-present

Area
  - Total: 34.31 km^{2} (13.25 sq mi)

Population (2004)
  - Total: 841
  - Density: 24.51/km^{2} (63.5/sq mi)
- Time zone: UTC+1 (CET)
  - Summer (DST): UTC+2 (CEST)
- Postal code: 9512
- Area code: 95

Ostffyasszonyfa (Hungarian: [ˈoʃtfiɒssoɲfɒ]) is a village in Vas county, Hungary. The village was first recorded in 1346 under the name Azzunfalva. By then it was already an important ferry point on the River Rába, and in later centuries also gained military strategic importance. Wooden bridges were constructed here, which were replaced by an iron bridge in the 19th century. The iron bridge was destroyed during World War II and the present bridge was built in the late 1960s.

== Name ==
The Osttfy- prefix in the village's name no doubt refers to the early landlords, but the origin of the latter part (asszonyfa: literally „the lady’s village”) has two interpretations. According to one it refers to the property right of a queen, and to the other it was to memorialize the Virgin Mary. The validity of the latter interpretation was reinforced by a 1758 source, which mentions the existence of a miracle-making icon of the Virgin brought here from Sopron County in 1620.

== History ==
The village had an old castle, which was built around 1250 in the marshy land at the confluence of the River Rába and the stream Lánka. At the time of Ferenc Ostffy it was known under the name Snake Stone Castle (Kígyókő-vár). The castle was pulled down by the Garai family on the grounds that Ferenc Ostffy had revolted against King Zsigmond. Today what remains of the castle is known as Csonkavár.

The village's first known lord was János Lökös, who was stripped of his land and cattle in the 14th century. The forfeited properties were passed into the hands of the Kun originated Ost family, whose descendants were the later Osttfys. Besides them, the Csornai family, the Török family from Enying, the Zichy family and the Vidos family all owned properties here, primarily gained through their marriage relationship with the Osttfys.

One of the largest Austro-Hungarian prisoner of war camps was on the outskirts of the village and the prisoners are memorialized in the cemetery and exhibition in the community centre.
