= Tokorcs =

- Location of Vas county in Hungary

- Location of Tokorcs
- Coordinates: 47.27835°N 17.08707°E
- Country: Hungary
- County: Vas

Area
  - Total: 6.4 km^{2} (2.5 sq mi)

Population (2004)
  - Total: 294
  - Density: 45.93/km^{2} (119.0/sq mi)
- Time zone: UTC+1 (CET)
  - Summer (DST): UTC+2 (CEST)
- Postal code: 9561
- Area code: 95

Tokorcs is a village in Vas county, Hungary.
