= Kisvásárhely =

Coordinates: 47°00′N 17°12′E

- Village
- Interactive map of Kisvásárhely
- Country: Hungary
- Region: Western Transdanubia
- County: Zala County
- Time zone: UTC+1 (CET)
  - Summer (DST): UTC+2 (CEST)

Kisvásárhely is a village in Zala County, Hungary.
