= Kávás =

Coordinates: 46°52′N 16°43′E

- Village
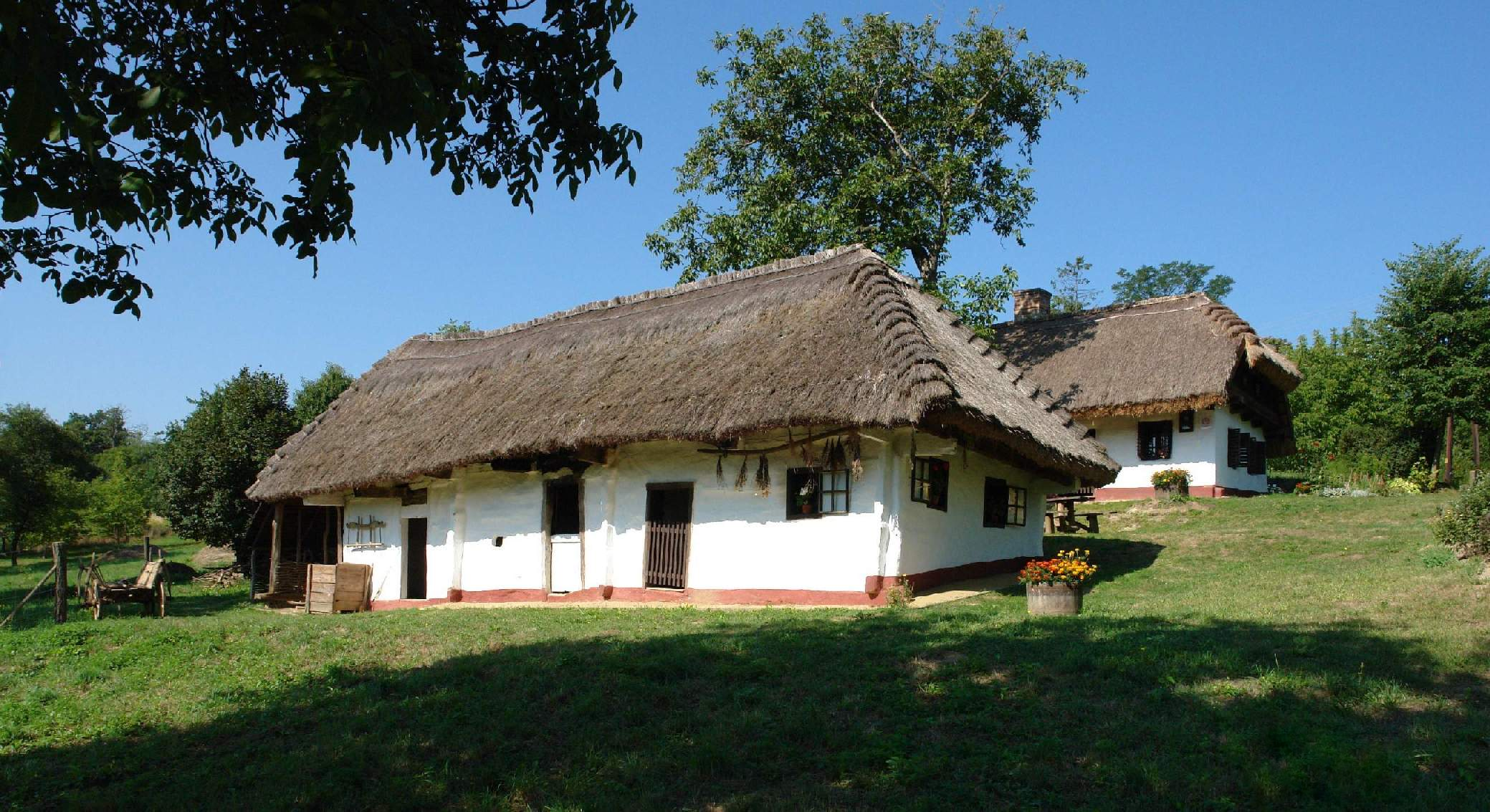
- Residences in Kávás. The lower building is also a museum.
- Interactive map of Kávás
- Country: Hungary
- Region: Western Transdanubia
- County: Zala County
- Time zone: UTC+1 (CET)
  - Summer (DST): UTC+2 (CEST)

Kávás is a village in Zala County, Hungary. There is a civil guard in the village.
