= Kisrécse =

Coordinates: 46°30′N 17°04′E

- Village
- Interactive map of Kisrécse
- Country: Hungary
- Region: Western Transdanubia
- County: Zala County
- Time zone: UTC+1 (CET)
  - Summer (DST): UTC+2 (CEST)
- Motorways: M7
- Distance from Budapest: 204 km (127 mi) Northeast

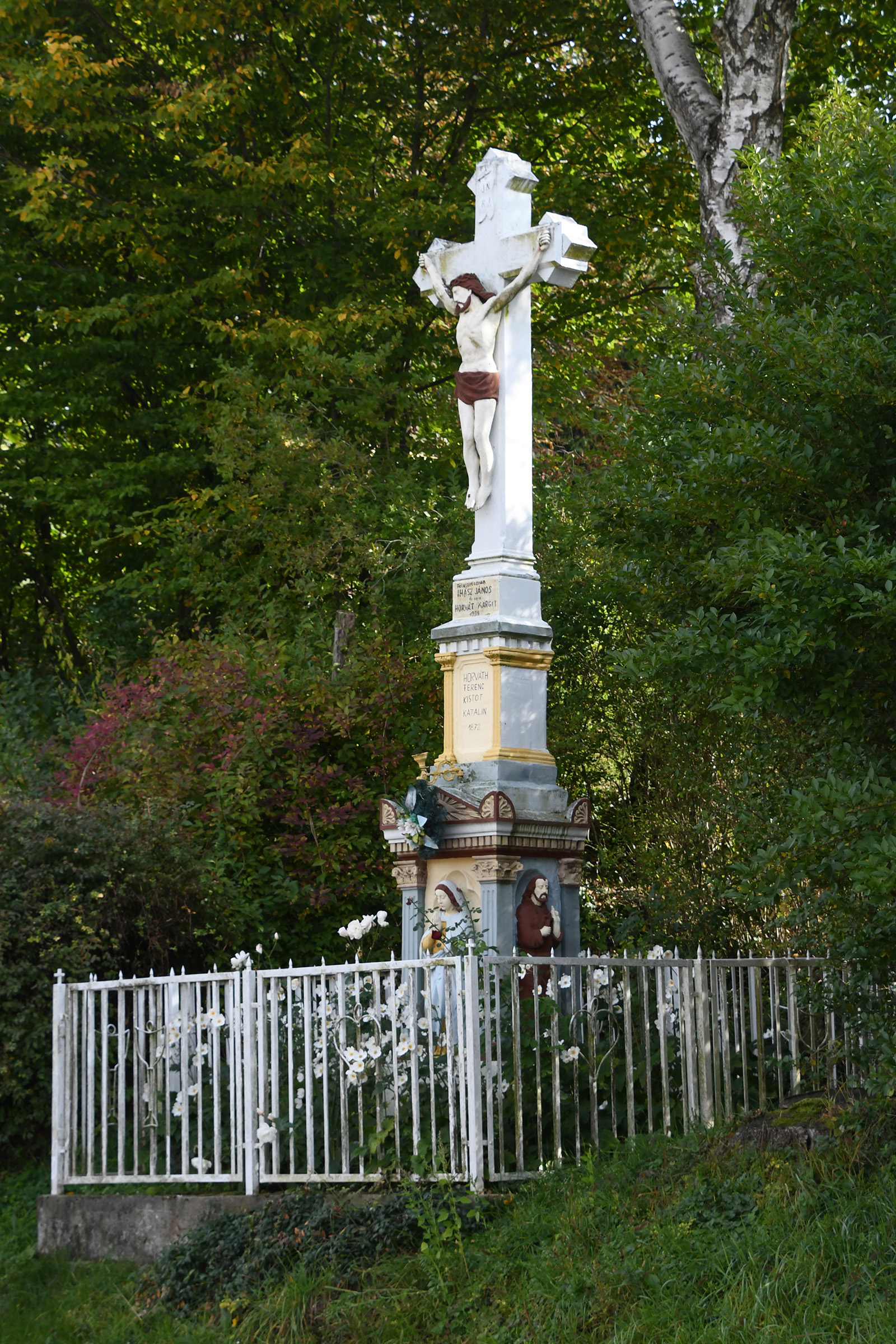
Painted cross in Kisrécse

Kisrécse is a village in Zala County, Hungary.
