= Keszü =

- Village
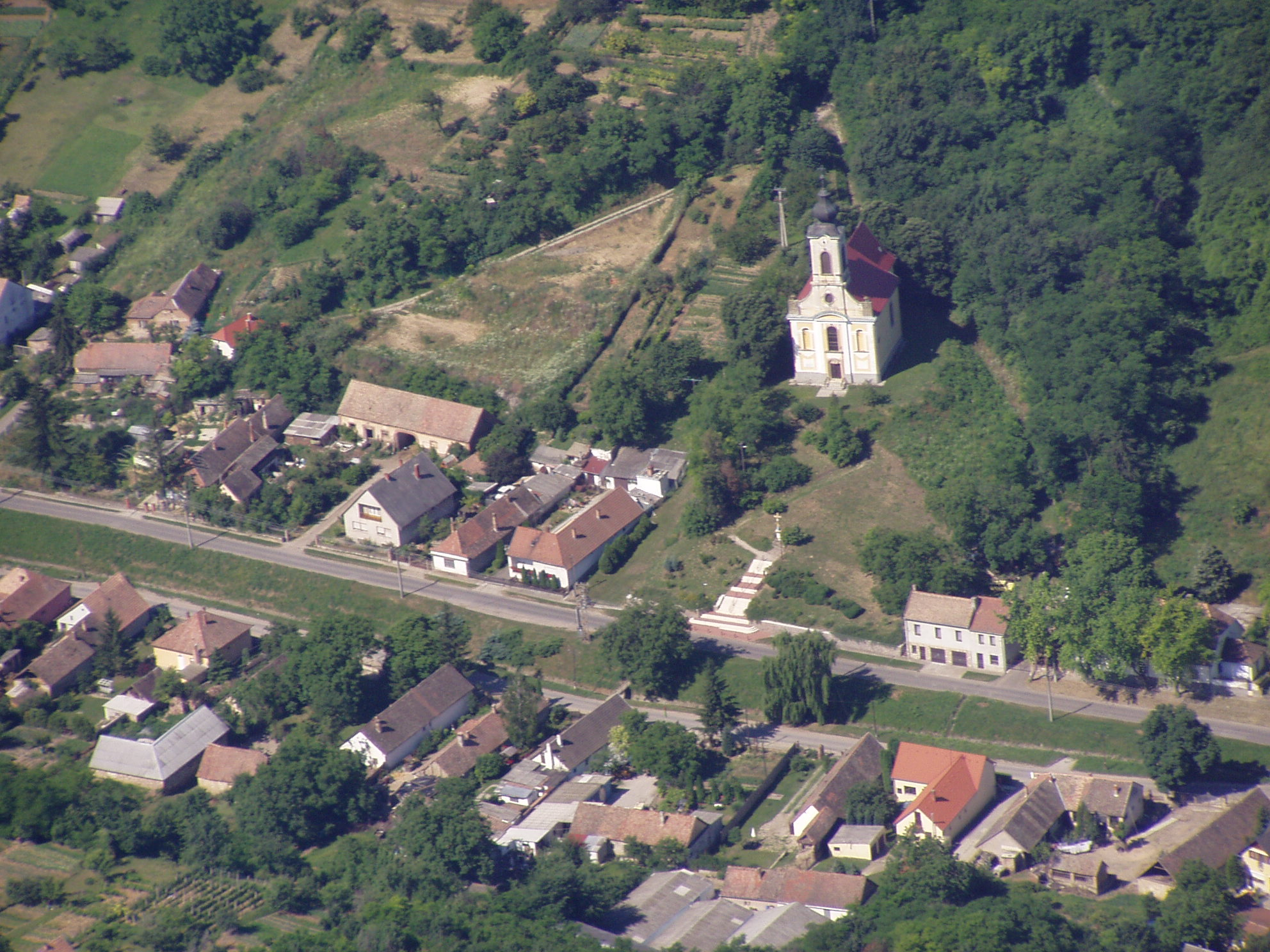
- Roman Catholic Church in Keszüi
- Interactive map of Keszü
- Coordinates: 46°01′N 18°11′E
- Country: Hungary
- County: Baranya
- Time zone: UTC+1 (CET)
  - Summer (DST): UTC+2 (CEST)

Keszü is a village in Baranya county, Hungary.
