= Kemenessömjén =

Village in Vas, Hungary

- Coat of arms

- Location of Kemenessömjén in Hungary
- Coordinates: 47.29545°N 17.13276°E
- Country: Hungary
- Region: Western Transdanubia
- County: Vas
- Subregion: Celldömölki
- Rank: Village

Area
  - Total: 16.05 km^{2} (6.20 sq mi)

Population (1 January 2008)
  - Total: 609
  - Density: 37.9/km^{2} (98.3/sq mi)
- Time zone: UTC+1 (CET)
  - Summer (DST): UTC+2 (CEST)
- Postal code: 9517
- Area code: +36 95
- KSH code: 24484
- Website: www.kemenessomjen.hu

Kemenessömjén is a village in Vas county, Hungary.
