= István Blazsetin (1941–2001) =

Croatian writer (1941–2001)

Stipan Blažetin
- Born: 24 October 1941; Hercegszántó, Hungary
- Died: 4 March 2001 (aged 59); Pécs, Hungary
- Other names: István Blazsetin
- Occupations: Writer and educator

István Blazsetin (Croatian: Stipan Blažetin, 24 October 1941 – 4 March 2001) was a Croatian writer, cultural worker and pedagogue from Hungary. According to some authors, he is considered to be a Croatian writer from Vojvodina, Serbia. He wrote poetry, novels and children's literature. Blažetin was an important collector of oral literature heritage of the Pomurje Croats.

== Biography ==
Blazsetin lived and worked in Hungarian town of Tótszerdahely (Serdahel).

As a worker in education, he was an important author of workbooks, audio textbooks, and teaching manuals. He was a member of the Croatian Writers Society. Blažetin wrote poetry for children in Croatian.

He was the father of the Croatian poet Stjepan Blažetin. The policy at that time dictated only Hungarian names could be used, so they are both shown as "István" in Hungarian documents.

== Works ==
- Srce na dlanu, poetry, 1981
- Bodoljaši, a novel for the children, 1986
- Tralala, tralala, propjevala svirala, poetry for children, 1990
- Korenje
- Lirske narodne pjesme pomurskih Hrvata u Totszerdahelyju, Kajkavsko-čakavsko razmeđe, Kajkavski zbornik. Izlaganja na znanstvenim skupovima u Zlataru 1970-1974., Narodno sveučilište "Ivan Goran Kovačić", Zlatar, 1974. p. 117-123 (a collection of folk oral poetry)

Some of his poetry entered an anthology of Croatian poetry in Hungary, 1945-2000. Rasuto biserje (ed.: Stjepan Blažetin).

His works became the part of the anthology Pjesništvo Hrvata u Mađarskoj = Poemaro de kroatoj en Hungario (Poetry of Croats in Hungary) (ed.: Đuro Vidmarović, Marija Belošević and Mijo Karagić).

== Awards ==
- honorary title "Excellent educational worker"

== External sources ==
- (in Croatian) Hrvatski glasnik (.pdf datoteka)
- (in Croatian and Hungarian) Oktatási és Kulturális Minisztérium Okvirni program hrv. jezika i književnosti za dvojezične škole - Književna baština Hrvata u Mađarskoj
- (in Croatian) Hrvatska književnost u Mađarskoj
- (in Croatian) Književni krug Reči Rieč, poezija, proza, književnost Stipan Blažetin
