= Kemenesszentmárton =

- Location of Vas county in Hungary

- Location of Kemenesszentmárton
- Coordinates: 47.29452°N 17.16170°E
- Country: Hungary
- County: Vas

Area
  - Total: 4.29 km^{2} (1.66 sq mi)

Population (2004)
  - Total: 240
  - Density: 55.94/km^{2} (144.9/sq mi)
- Time zone: UTC+1 (CET)
  - Summer (DST): UTC+2 (CEST)
- Postal code: 9521
- Area code: 95

Kemenesszentmárton is a village in Vas county, Hungary.

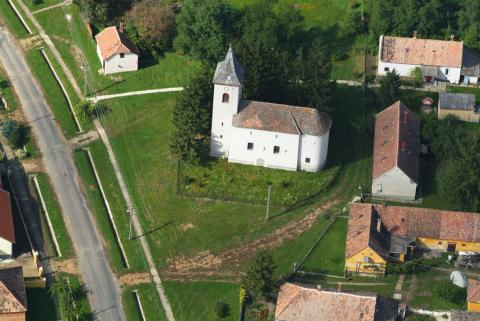
Aerial photograph of Kemenesszentmárton.
