= Kemenespálfa =

- Coat of arms

- Location of Kemenespálfa in Hungary
- Coordinates: 47.13620°N 17.17453°E
- Country: Hungary
- Region: Western Transdanubia
- County: Vas
- Subregion: Celldömölki
- Rank: Village

Area
  - Total: 13.72 km^{2} (5.30 sq mi)

Population (1 January 2008)
  - Total: 456
  - Density: 33.2/km^{2} (86.1/sq mi)
- Time zone: UTC+1 (CET)
  - Summer (DST): UTC+2 (CEST)
- Postal code: 9544
- Area code: +36 95
- KSH code: 20996
- Website: https://kemenespalfa.hu/

Kemenespálfa is a village in Vas county, Hungary.
