= Keléd =

- Coat of arms

- Location of Keléd in Hungary
- Coordinates: 47.07881°N 17.11641°E
- Country: Hungary
- Region: Western Transdanubia
- County: Vas
- Subregion: Celldömölki
- Rank: Village

Area
  - Total: 8.72 km^{2} (3.37 sq mi)

Population (1 January 2008)
  - Total: 76
  - Density: 8.7/km^{2} (23/sq mi)
- Time zone: UTC+1 (CET)
  - Summer (DST): UTC+2 (CEST)
- Postal code: 9549
- Area code: +36 95
- KSH code: 32036
- Website: http://keled.hu/

Keléd is a village in Vas county, Hungary.
