= Kemenesmihályfa =

- Location of Vas county in Hungary

- Location of Kemenesmihályfa
- Coordinates: 47.28503°N 17.11380°E
- Country: Hungary
- County: Vas

Area
  - Total: 17.81 km^{2} (6.88 sq mi)

Population (2004)
  - Total: 562
  - Density: 31.55/km^{2} (81.7/sq mi)
- Time zone: UTC+1 (CET)
  - Summer (DST): UTC+2 (CEST)
- Postal code: 9511
- Area code: 95

Kemenesmihályfa is a village in Vas county, Hungary.
