= Kökény =

Kökény Kukinj
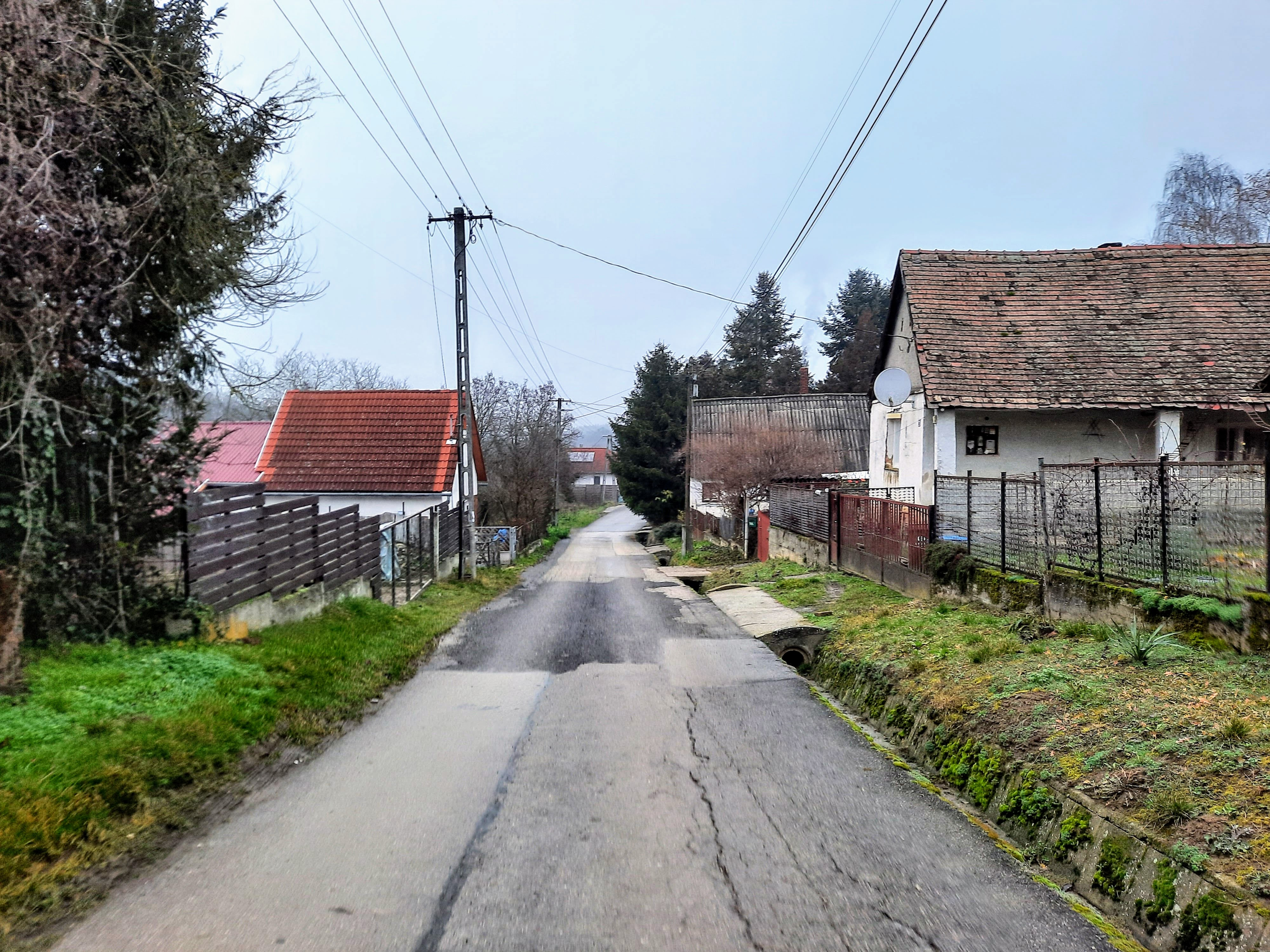

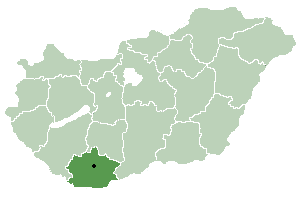
- Location of Baranya county in Hungary

- Kökény
- Coordinates: 45.9969°N 18.2028°E
- Country: Hungary
- County: Baranya

Population (2005)
  - Total: 566
- Time zone: UTC+1 (CET)
  - Summer (DST): UTC+2 (CEST)
- Postal code: 7668

Kökény (Croatian: Kukinj) is a village in Baranya County, Hungary.

== Geography ==
It has a population of 566 people (2005). Its postal code is 7668.

== Demography ==
- Magyars
- Croats

== Culture ==
In 2006, Kökény won the award of Hrvatska matica iseljenika (Croatian Heritage Foundation, organization of Croat diaspora), Najselo.

- folklore society «Ladislav Matušek»
