= Kemenesmagasi =

- Location of Vas county in Hungary

- Location of Kemenesmagasi
- Coordinates: 47.33183°N 17.20755°E
- Country: Hungary
- County: Vas

Area
  - Total: 33.19 km^{2} (12.81 sq mi)

Population (2004)
  - Total: 934
  - Density: 28.14/km^{2} (72.9/sq mi)
- Time zone: UTC+1 (CET)
  - Summer (DST): UTC+2 (CEST)
- Postal code: 9522
- Area code: 95

Kemenesmagasi rotatable.png

Kemenesmagasi is a village in Vas county, Hungary.
