= Apponyi family =

Hungarian noble family

Coat of arms as granted in 1739

The House of Apponyi, also known as Apponyi de Nagy-Appony, was a prominent and powerful Hungarian family of the high upper nobility of the Kingdom of Hungary, whose members remained notable even after the kingdom's dismemberment in the successor states of Hungary and Czechoslovakia.

== History ==
While tracing its origins to the High Middle Ages, the family became prominent in the 18th century with its elevation to the rank of Counts of Nagy-Appony in 1739 and the acquisition of seventeen grand domains between 1760 and 1800. In the last century of the Habsburg monarchy, four of its members received the Order of the Golden Fleece, a total held in a draw among the European nobility by the houses of Esterházy, Batthyány, Cziráki and Pálffy (4 each). In addition, Albert Apponyi received the Order in 1921 shortly after the end of the monarchy. In addition to this the Apponyi family sat within all Hungarian Kings and then Habsburg private courts which was reserved only for the most powerful and important members of the Kingdom.

The family's name refers to Appony, now Oponice, a region located North of Nitra in present-day Slovakia, in which the family established itself in the late 14th century. Nagy-Appony ("Greater Appony") is the southern part of the area, which was long ruled by the Apponyi family.

Many Apponyis were active in the military, politics, and/or the Catholic Church, as was customary in Hungarian aristocratic families. More distinctive of the Apponyi family was its tradition of Diplomacy for the Kingdom of Hungary then the Habsburg monarchy, and briefly for Interwar Hungary in the significant case of Albert Apponyi. Bibliophilia was another distinguished Apponyi family tradition, the most prominent legacy of which is the Apponyi Library, now a part of the Slovak National Library and still located in the former Apponyi Castle in Oponice.

== Nomenclature ==
The Apponyis, like other Hungarian magnates, juggled different languages when it came to given names. They were typically bilingual in Hungarian and German and educated in other languages as well, and went by corresponding names depending on context. Thus, the Hungarian name Apponyi Antal refers to the same individual as Anton Apponyi (German), Antoine Apponyi (French), or Antonius Apponyi (Latin) - Latin having remained widely used as a written language in Hungary well into the modern era. English-language historiography generally displays the first given name in Hungarian, but with the family name put last as customary in Europe outside of Hungary, e.g. Antal Apponyi. During Josephinism and its aftermath until around the Compromise of 1867, however, the use of Hungarian was suppressed in nobility families such as the Apponyis, and German names were more customary.

== From the 14th to the 18th century ==
The Apponyis claimed ancestors among the Magyar tribes through the Péc clan. Beyond genealogy, little is known of the family history until the Late Middle Ages.

=== Miklós (Nicolaus) Apponyi (late 14th/early 15th century) ===
In Miklós's time the family was granted the fortress of Appony (now Oponice) by King Sigismund in 1392, upon which it took up the Apponyi name.

=== Barons Péter (?–1626) and Pál Apponyi (1564–1624) ===
Brothers Péter and Pál were made Barons in June 1606 by King Rudolf in recognition of their fight against the Ottomans. They were signatories of the Peace of Vienna with Stephen Bocskai in the same year. They died without heirs, which meant no sons could carry on the baronial title.

=== Baron Balázs (Blasius) Apponyi (?–1637) ===
Balázs, a cousin of Péter and Pál, inherited the Appony domain after Péter's death. He in turn was made a Baron by King Ferdinand II, on 12 November 1624, possibly for his literary activity and/or role in negotiations in Vienna with the supporters of Gabriel Bethlen. On 8 January 1636 Ferdinand II appointed him one of his Hungarian royal advisers. He was a distinguished writer of religious poetry in Latin. He died without male heirs, which meant the Apponyi family remained untitled until the elevation of Lázár to Baron in 1718. He was buried in the monastery of Horné Lefantovce.

=== János Apponyi (early 17th century) ===
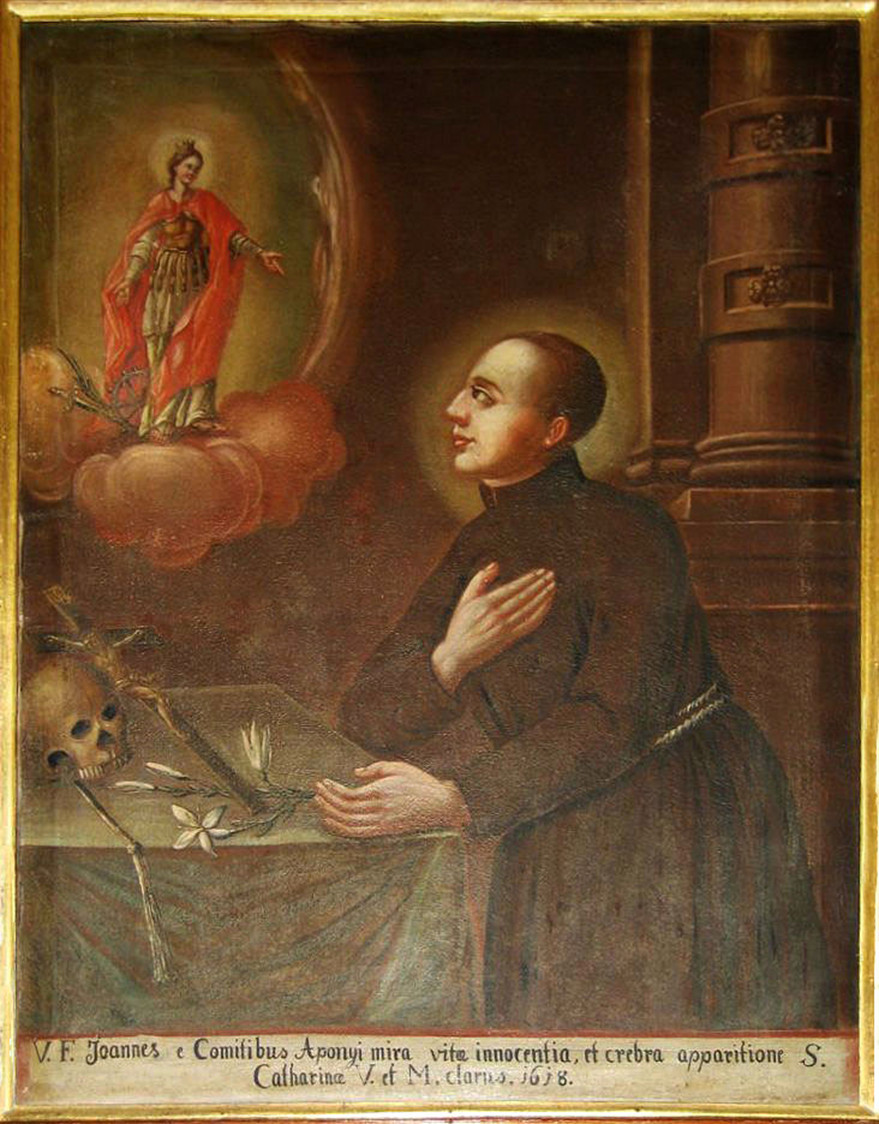
Apparition of Catherine of Alexandria to János Apponyi (1618)

János is said to have joined the Franciscan order as a young nobleman and to have had a vision of Saint Catherine of Alexandria, in 1617 or 1618. Tradition has that he died shortly afterwards, after his family refused to acknowledge his religious vocation. In his memory, Count Kristóf Erdődy founded a monastery dedicated to Saint Catherine in Dejte (now Dechtice) in 1618. The monastery, today known as Katarínka, was dissolved in 1786 by Joseph II but its ruined church still stands.

=== Count Lázár Apponyi (?–1739) ===
Lázár fought at the Siege of Buda (1686), where his father Miklós Apponyi died. He was personally raised to the hereditary rank of Baron by Charles VI in Vienna on 16 February 1718, for his outstanding military contribution to the Habsburg fights against the Ottoman Empire. Charles VI then made Lázár Count of Nagy-Appony on 30 May 1739 in Laxenburg, and his descendants kept that title until the end of the monarchic period. The family's coat of arms also dates from that moment.

=== József Apponyi (1718–1787) ===
József, son of Lázár, joined the Society of Jesus in Vienna in 1736, studied there and in Graz until 1741, then taught grammar in Győr (1742) and Trnava (1743). He later lectured in philosophy, logic, mathematics, physics, theology, and ethics. His Oratio de augustissimo verbi incarnati mysterio was published in Vienna in 1745. He remained a Catholic priest after the Suppression of the Society of Jesus.

=== Count Antal György (Anton Georg) Apponyi (1751–1817) ===
Antal György (or György Antal), grandson of Lázár and son of György László (Georg Ladislaus) Apponyi (1736–1782), was a major cultural figure who founded the Apponyi Library. Joseph Haydn dedicated him six quartets in 1793 (No. 54 to 59, Op. 71 & 74), since known as "Apponyi Quartets". Wolfgang Amadeus Mozart is also believed to have composed several pieces for him. In 1795, Antal György Apponyi invited Ludwig van Beethoven to try his hand at a string quartet, an attempt that only materialized a few years later with the Opus 18 quartets published in 1801. From 1784 he rebuilt the castle in the domain his father had purchased in Hőgyész, and spent much of his later life there.

== Éberhárd Line ==
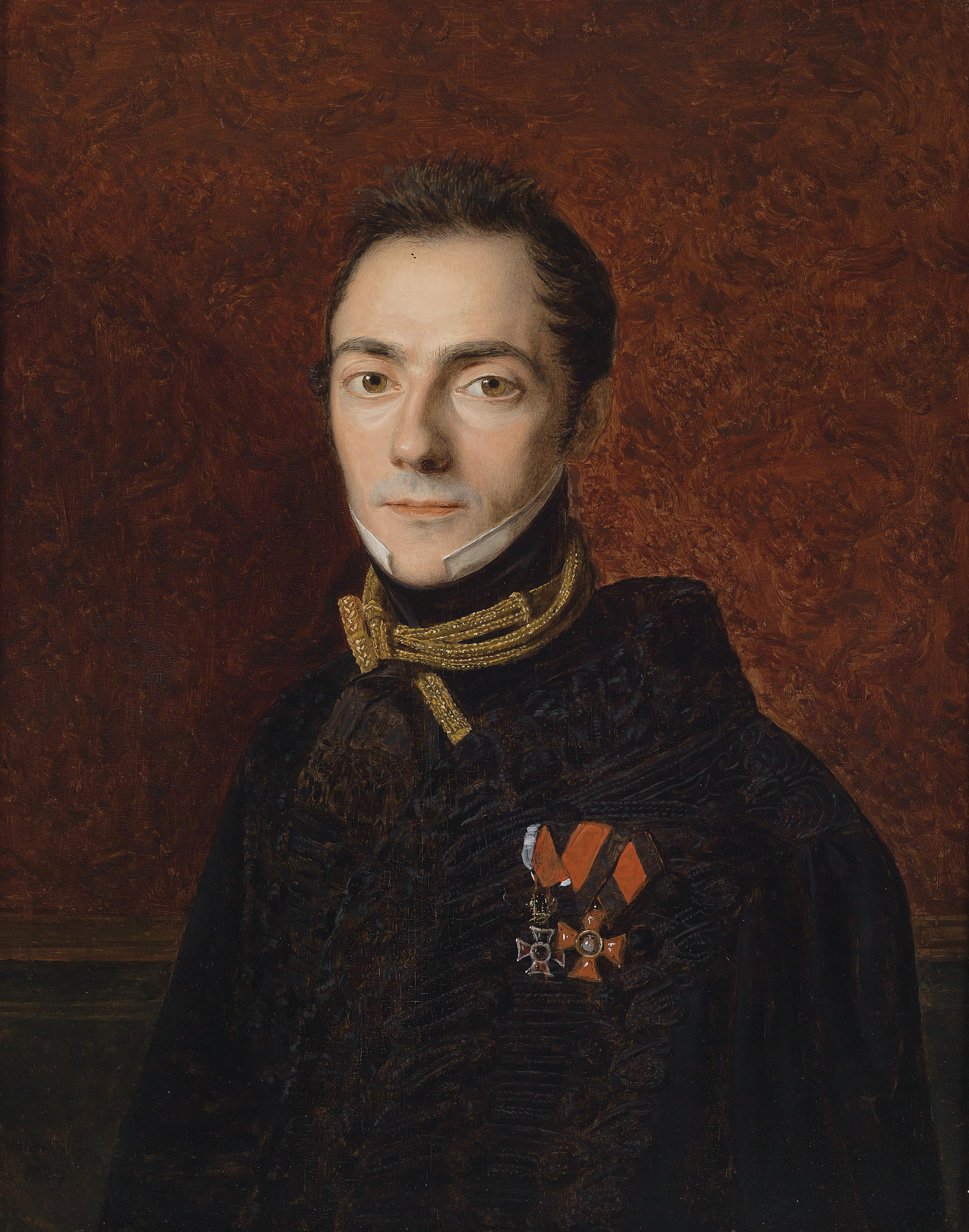
György Apponyi by Ferdinand Georg Waldmüller, 1827

György (Georg) Apponyi (1780–1849), eldest son of Antal György, established himself in Eberhárd (now Malinovo), a castle near Pressburg (Pozsony, today's Bratislava) which had been purchased by his grandfather György and which his descendants kept until the dismemberment of the Kingdom of Hungary. Members of this branch are still alive today.

=== Count György (Georg) Apponyi (1808–1899) ===
György, son of György and grandson of Antal György, was a prominent conservative politician. He was Hungarian chancellor (1846–48) and Speaker of the Hungarian House of Magnates in 1861.

=== Count Albert Apponyi (1846–1933) ===
Albert, son of György, was a major Hungarian statesman of the conservative Party of Independence and '48. He is remembered both for his notorious 1907 legislation on the Magyarization of public education in the Kingdom of Hungary, known as Apponyi Law or Lex Apponyi, and for his brilliant (though unsuccessful) defense of Hungarian positions in the negotiations that led to the Treaty of Trianon in 1920. He received the Order of the Golden Fleece in 1921. He was also well respected by all of the major leaders of the time, such as Theodore Roosevelt who considered him a very dear friend, along with stayed at his estate when he came to visit Budapest in 1910. Upon his death he was also granted the title of prince regent a title which although not hereditary in nature can still be used for state matters and when referring to Albert Apponyi.

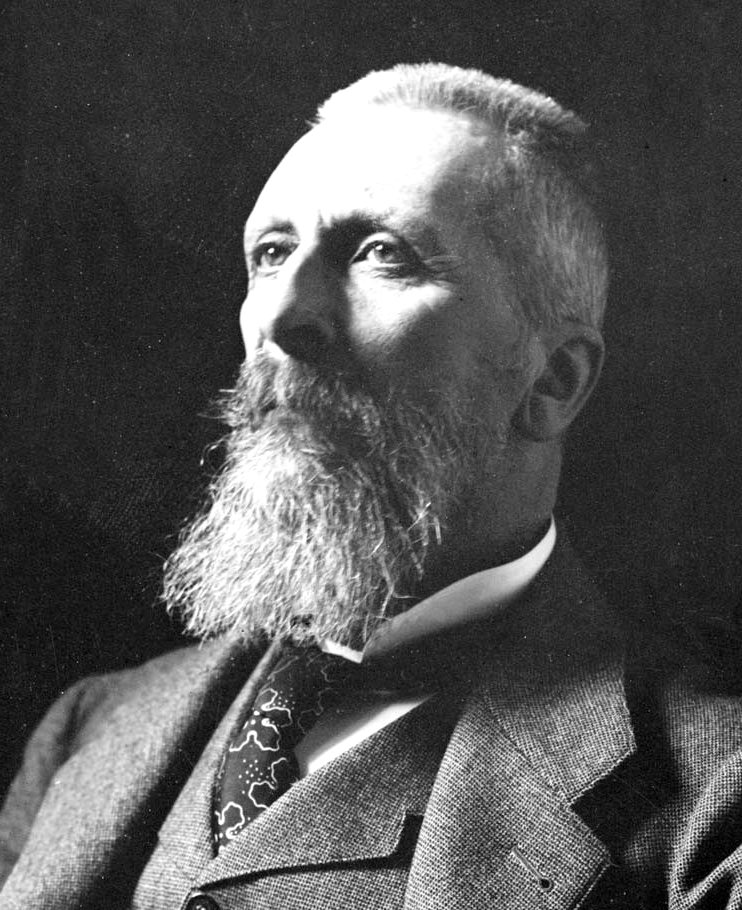
Albert Apponyi (1846–1933)

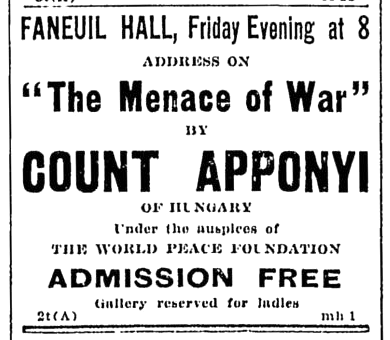
Publicity for a conference given by Albert Apponyi in Boston, 1911

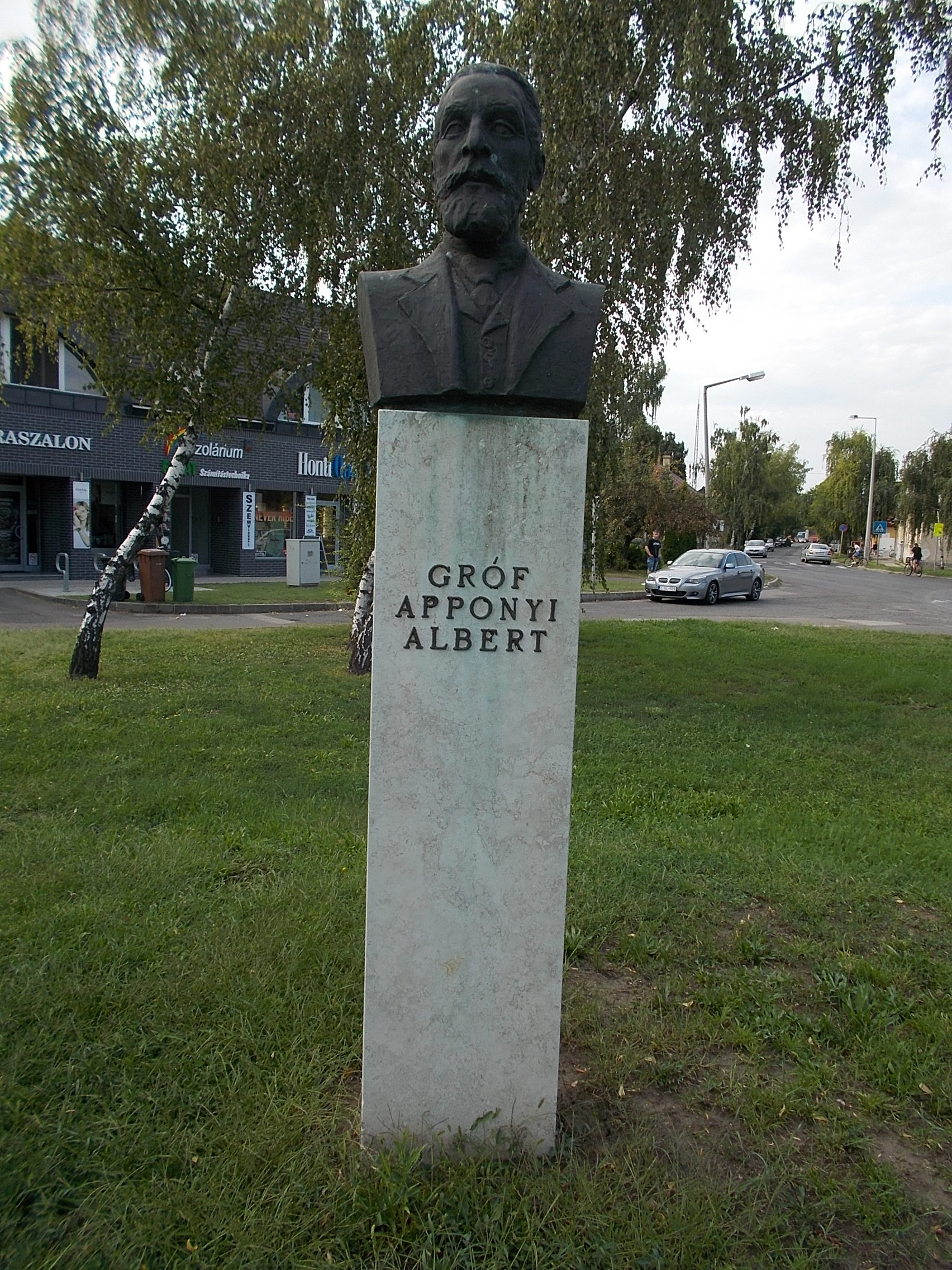
Monument to Albert Apponyi in Jászberény, Hungary

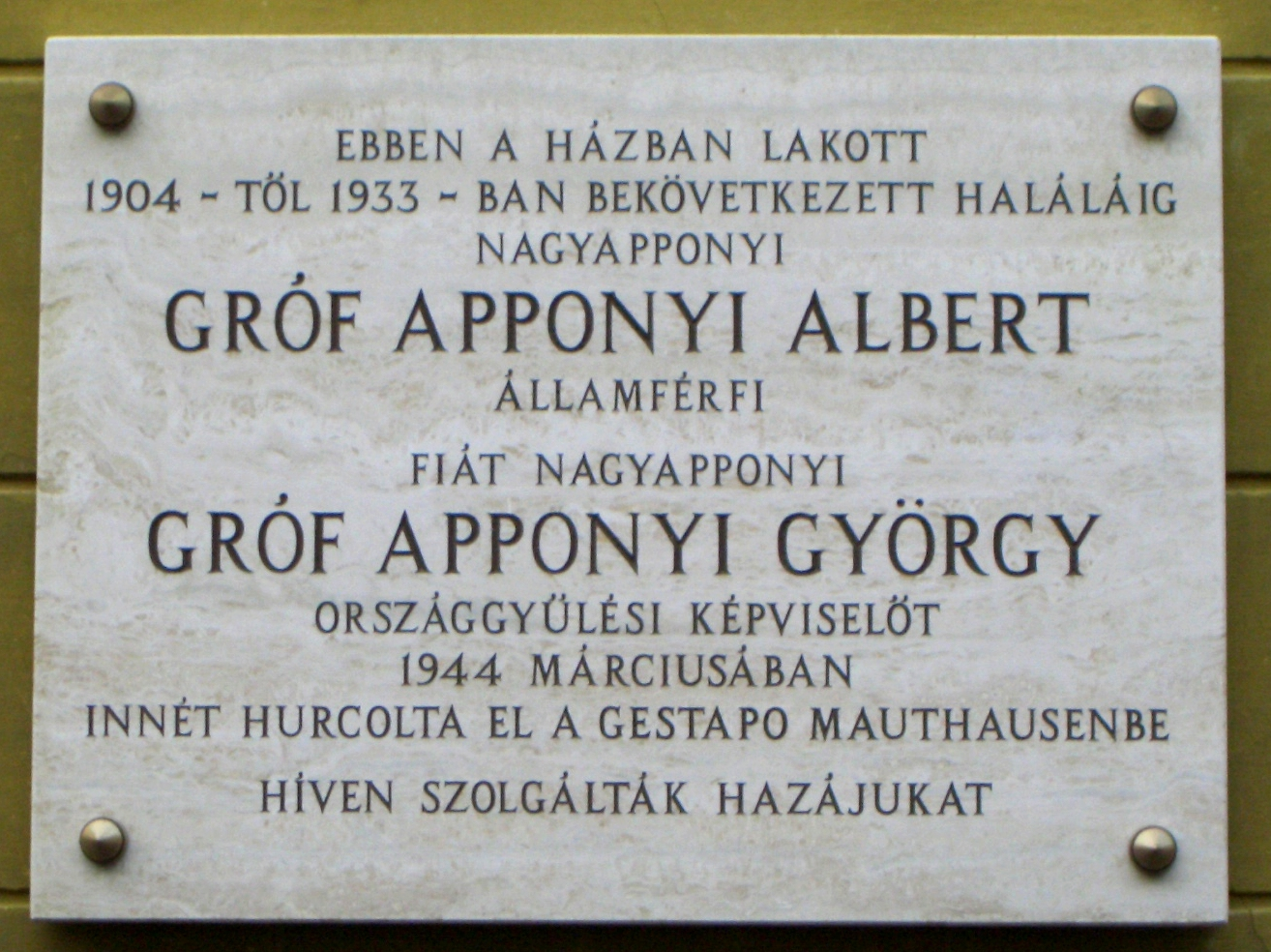
Memorial plaque on the former house of Albert Apponyi and his son György in Castle Quarter of Budapest, Hungary

=== Countess Klotild (Clotilde) Apponyi (1867–1942) ===
Clotilde, née von Mensdorff-Pouilly and wife of Albert, was a prominent advocate of women's rights and women's suffrage, and a delegate for Hungary to the League of Nations in 1935–1937.

== Appony Line ==
Antal György Apponyi's second son Antal and his descendants kept custody of the ancestral family property in Oponice, where they lived until 1935. A branch of this family line held the Hőgyész domain until 1939.

=== Count Antal (Anton) Apponyi (1782–1852) ===
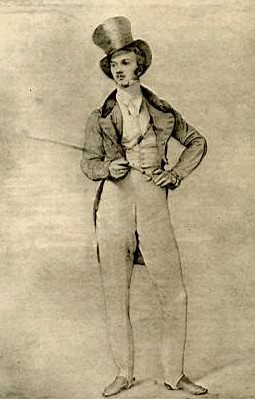
Antoine Apponyi by Ingres (1823), Fogg Art Museum

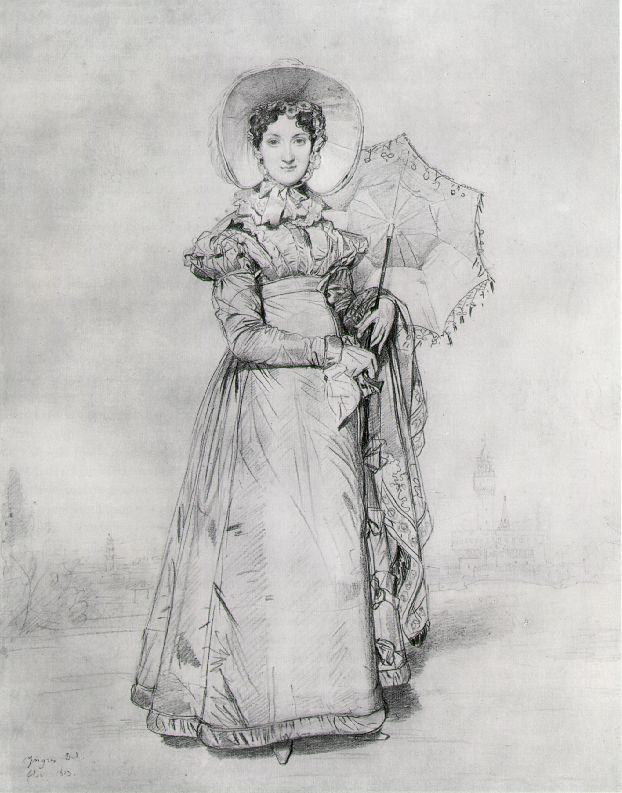
Thérèse Apponyi by Ingres (1823), Fogg Art Museum

Antal was a diplomat for the Habsburg monarchy in Karlsruhe (Grand Duchy of Baden), Florence (Grand Duchy of Tuscany) from 1816 to 1819, and Rome (Papal States) from 1820 to 1826. In 1826 he became Ambassador in Paris, a position he held until 1848. He received the Order of the Golden Fleece in 1836. He died in the Apponyi castle on 17 October 1852.

=== Countess Teresa Apponyi (1790–1874) ===
Maria Teresa, née Nogarolla in Munich of an old family originally from Verona, married Antal Apponyi in 1808. She impressed diplomats at the Congress of Vienna and gained the nickname la divine Thérèse. Frédéric Chopin dedicated her his Nocturne Op. 27 No. 1 and Op. 27 No. 2.

=== Count Lajos (Ludwig) Apponyi (1849–1909) ===
Lajos, grandson of Antal and son of Gyula Apponyi (1816–1857), was appointed Marshal of the Court in Hungary (Hofmarschall in Ungarn) by Emperor Franz Joseph in December 1895, a newly created position that entailed guardianship of the royal palaces of Budapest and Gödöllő. Among other functions, he represented the monarchy at the ceremonial reburial of King Béla III and Queen Agnes of Antioch in Matthias Church on 21 October 1898. He was a member of the Budapest Park Club and of the Budapest Applied Art Society.

=== Countess Margit (Marguerite) Apponyi (1848–1931) ===
Marguerite, née von Seherr-Thoss (de) from an ancient noble family in Silesia, married Lajos Apponyi in 1871. She was an active manager of the Appony estate and of the family's literary legacy. She ensured the publications of the memoirs of Rezső Apponyi (of the Jablánc line) and of her son Henrik Apponyi. She also had the decades-long correspondence of her mother-in-law Szofia (née Sztáray, wife of Gyula) with Charles de Montalembert edited by François Buloz and published in the Revue des deux Mondes in 1913. She devoted herself to philanthropy, together with her husband, especially with the hospital and school in Oponice.

=== Count Henrik Apponyi (1885–1935) ===
Henrik started a diplomatic career, in Berlin (1912–1913) and Istanbul (1913–1914), but that was cut short by World War I and the end of the Habsburg monarchy. He relocated to Oponice in 1918 and dedicated his life to adventurous traveling, particularly in Sudan (1924) and India and Tibet (1930). His travel notes were published in London in 1937 under the title My big-game hunting diary from India and the Himalayas, with a foreword by the Viscount Halifax whom Henrik had met while in India. The book came out after the deaths of both his mother Marguerite, who had promoted the publication project, and that of Henrik himself. He died in Berlin in unclear circumstances.

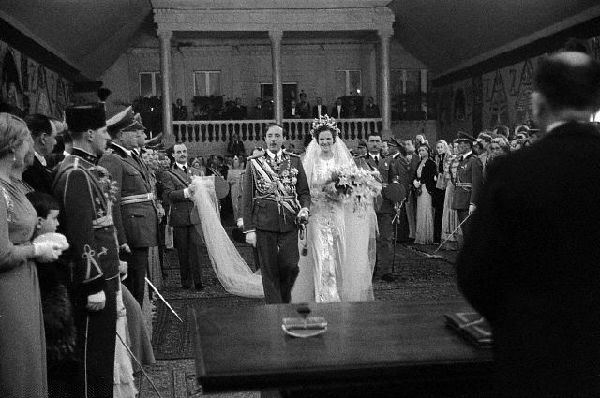
Wedding of Geraldine Apponyi with King Zog, 1938

=== Geraldine Apponyi (1915–2002) ===
Geraldine was a granddaughter of Lajos and daughter of Gyula Apponyi (1873–1924) and his American wife Gladys Virginia Steuart (1891–1947). She married King Zog I of Albania in Tirana, in a grand ceremony on 27 April 1938. She reigned as Queen consort for less than a year, then spent most of her long life in exile.

== Lengyel line ==
The two brothers Rezső and Gyula Apponyi inherited Lengyel Castle in 1863 from their uncle József Apponyi (1788–1863), third son of Antal György. Rezső took over Lengyel while Gyula stayed in Appony (Oponice). Members of this branch lived in Lengyel until 1930.

=== Count Rezső (Rudolf) Apponyi (1812–1876) ===
Rudolf, son of Antal, was a diplomat, initially in Paris and Saint Petersburg where he married in 1843, with Emperor Nicholas I and Empress Alexandra Feodorovna both attending. He later served in Karlsruhe (1847–1849), Turin (1849–1853), Munich (1853–1856), London (1856–1871, from 1860 as Ambassador), and Paris (Ambassador, 1871–1876). He received the Order of the Golden Fleece in 1865. In 1866 he contracted the sublease of the Habsburg Embassy in London on Belgrave Square, where the Embassy of Austria remains to this day.

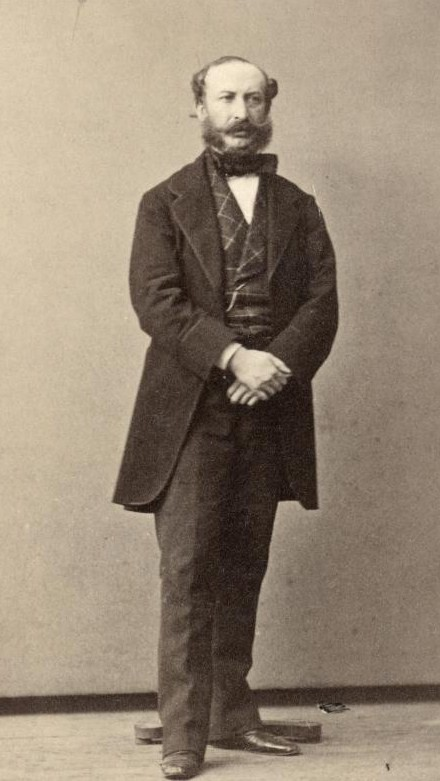
Rudolf Apponyi

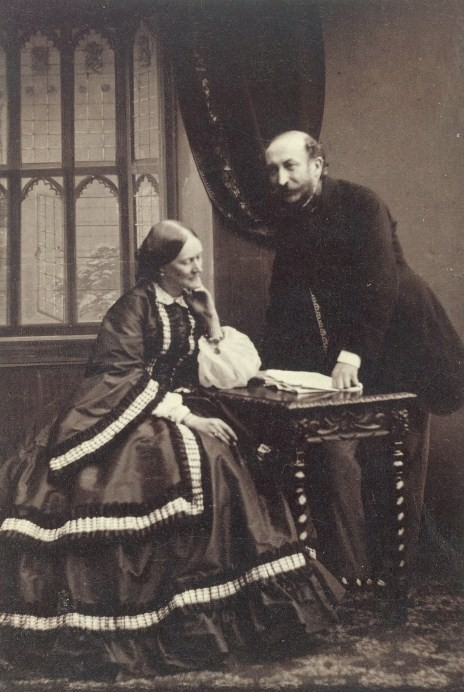
Rudolf with his wife Anna von Benckendorff

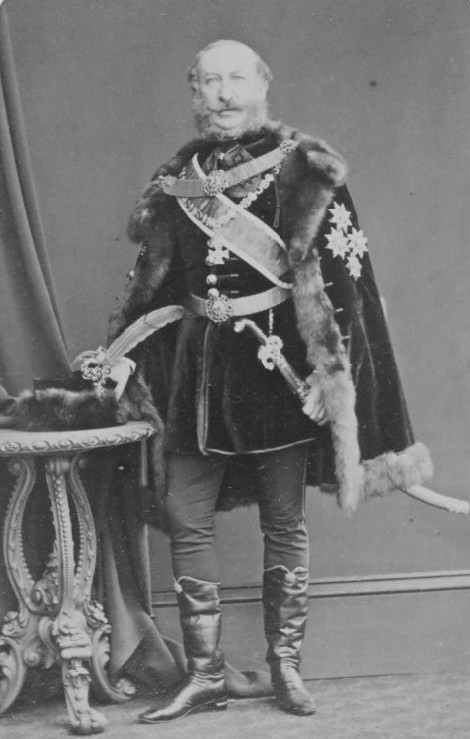
Rudolf in ceremonial attire, 1860s

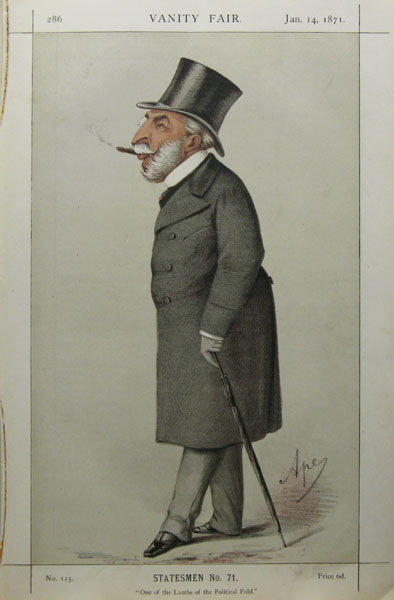
Caricature of Rudolf Apponyi in the British Vanity Fair, 1871

=== Count Sándor (Alexander) Apponyi (1844–1925) ===
Sándor, son of Rezső, started as a diplomat. He left that service in 1876 to devote himself to bibliophilia. He received the Order of the Golden Fleece in 1907.

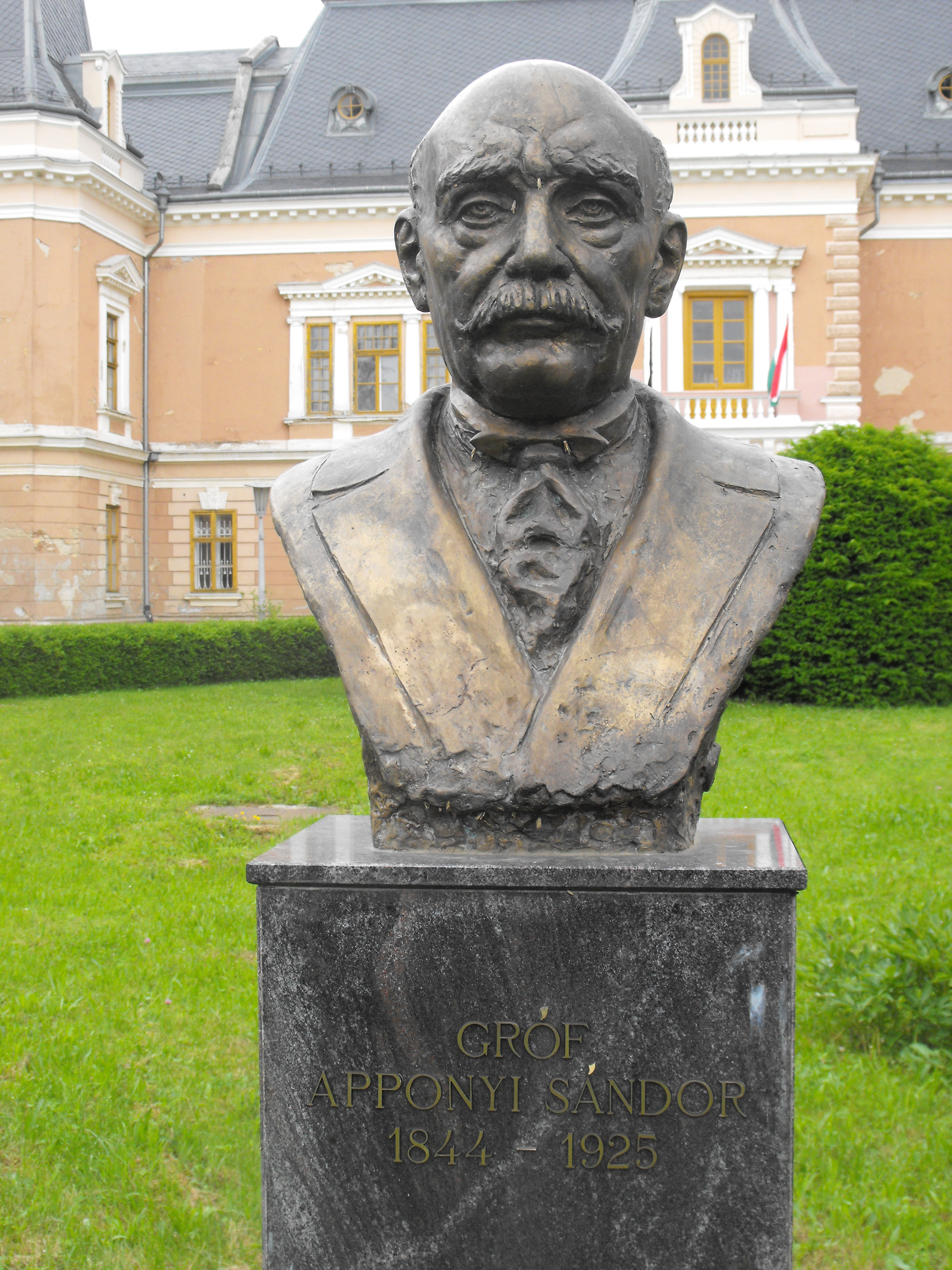
Bust of Sándor Apponyi in front of Lengyel Castle

== Other members of the Apponyi family ==
=== Jablánc line ===
The brothers Pál and János Apponyi (not descendants of Lázár, thus not counts) together inherited the castle in Jablánc (German Jablonitz or Apfelsdorf, formerly also Jabloncza or Jablonicz in Hungarian, now Jablonica in Slovakia) in 1772. In 1784 it was reconstructed and went to Pál, while János stayed in Appony (Oponice). After Pál's death it went to his son József (Joseph) Apponyi (1784–1853), who was made a Count by Emperor Francis I in April 1808. Members of this branch stayed in Jablánc until the aftermath of World War I, after which it changed hands .

József's son Rezső (more often referred to as Rudolf, sometimes Rudolf II to distinguish him from his relative of the Lengyel line; 1802–1853) served as a junior diplomat (attaché) in Paris from 1826 to 1850, hired by the Habsburg monarchy's ambassador his distant uncle Antal. Long after his death, his notes from this period, which had been kept in the family library, were edited in Paris by Ernest Daudet at the instigation of Count Lajos Apponyi's wife Marguerite, and published by Plon in four volumes between 1913 and 1926 as Journal du Comte Rodolphe Apponyi.

=== Silvio Apponyi (1949–) ===
Silvio Apponyi is an Australian sculptor, born 1949 in a refugee camp near Munich. His father Albert Friedrich Apponyi, who descended from an illegitimate line of the family, was allowed to use the family name after emigrating to Australia.

== Apponyi properties ==
Over the years the Apponyis built or acquired numerous properties in the Kingdom of Hungary and in Vienna. At the peak they had around 30 properties to their name over the empire. Several of these still stand.

=== Appony (today Oponice, Slovakia) ===
The Apponyi fortress on a hill above the village probably already existed in the time of Great Moravia and was acquired by the Apponyis in 1392. In 1645 it was badly damaged by fire and was finally destroyed by the Habsburg army in 1708 after it had been used by Kuruc rebels during Rákóczi's War of Independence.

The manor in the village was built in stages from the 16th century onwards and was used as one of the family's many residences from the mid-17th century to 1935. It underwent extensive renovation in 2007–2011 and has since operated as a luxury hotel, branded Chateau-Appony, with the library wing of 1846 again hosting the Apponyi Library.

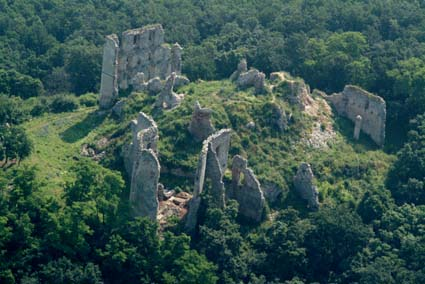
Ruined Apponyi castle in Oponice, Slovakia

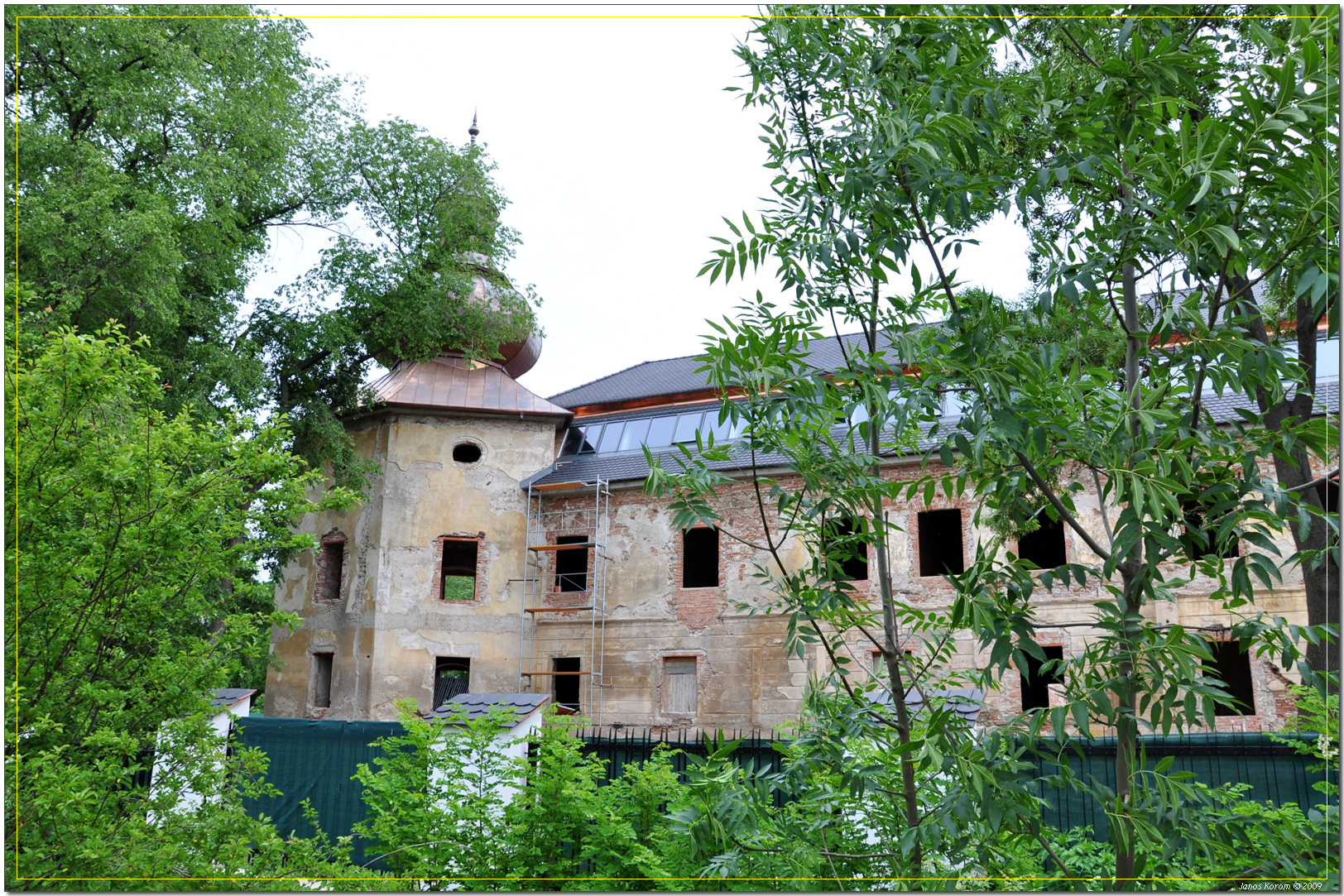
Apponyi Manor (during restoration in 2009)

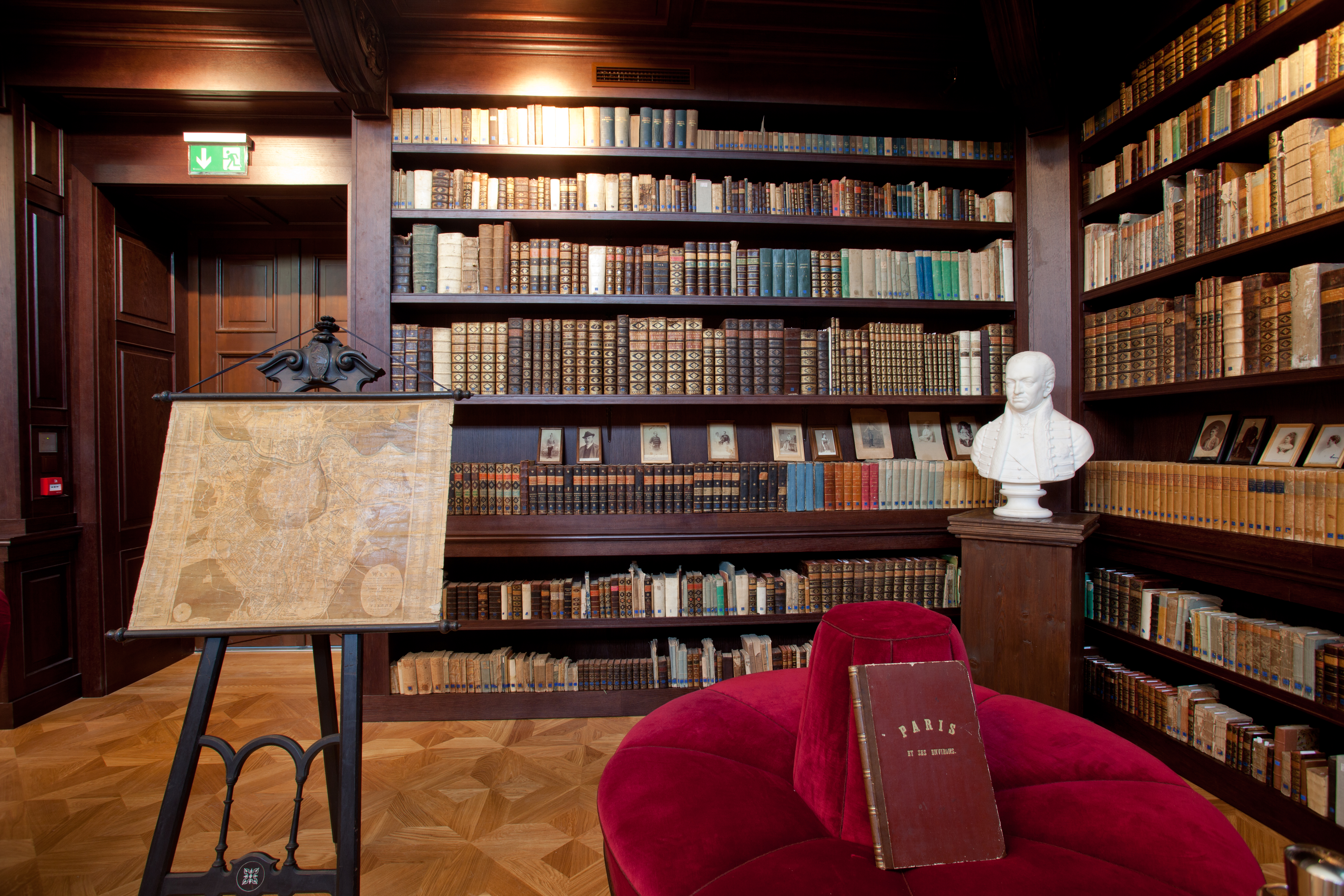
Restored Apponyi Library in Apponyi Manor

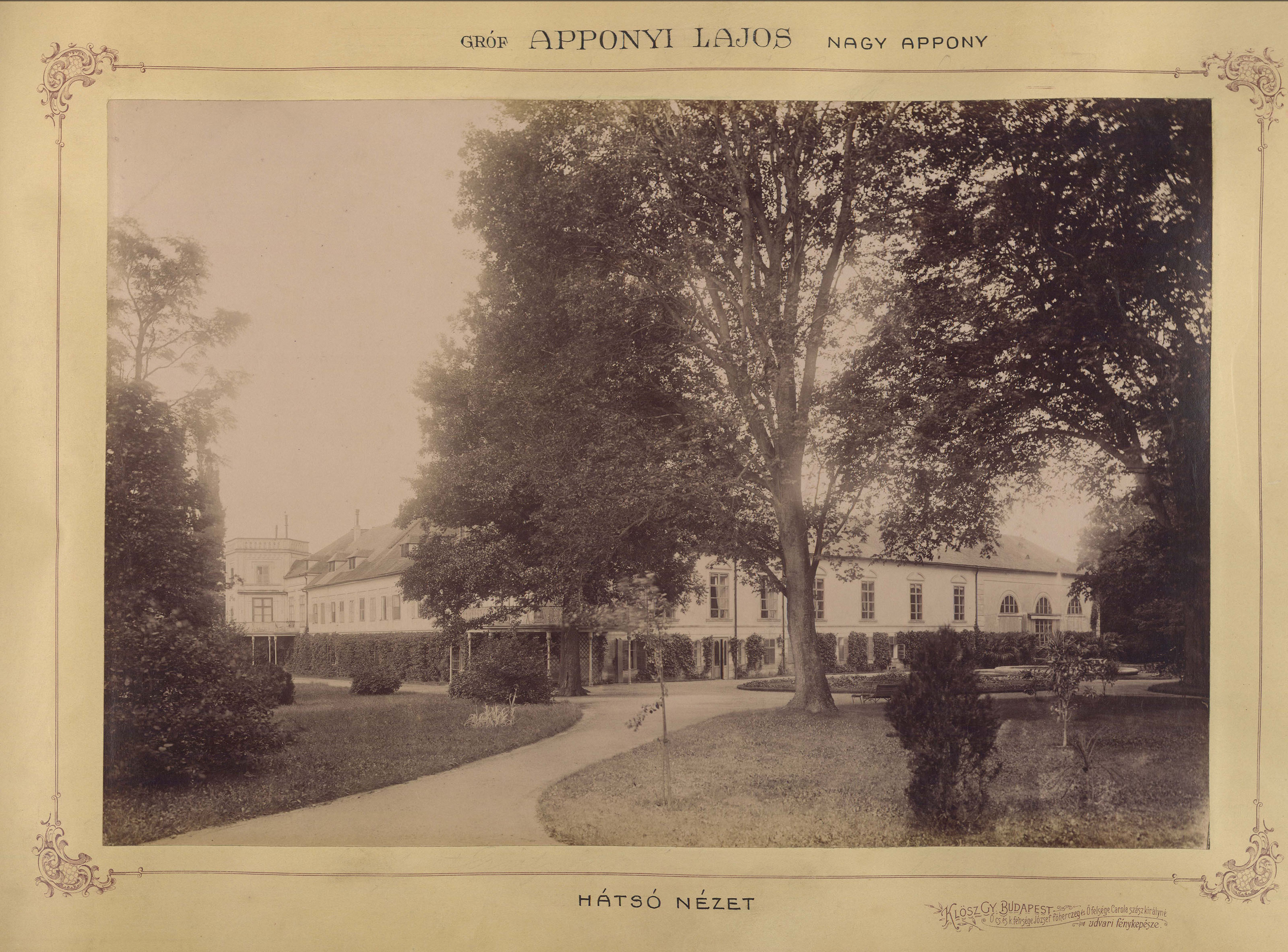
1900 postcard of Apponyi Manor

=== Éberhárd (today Malinovo, Slovakia) ===
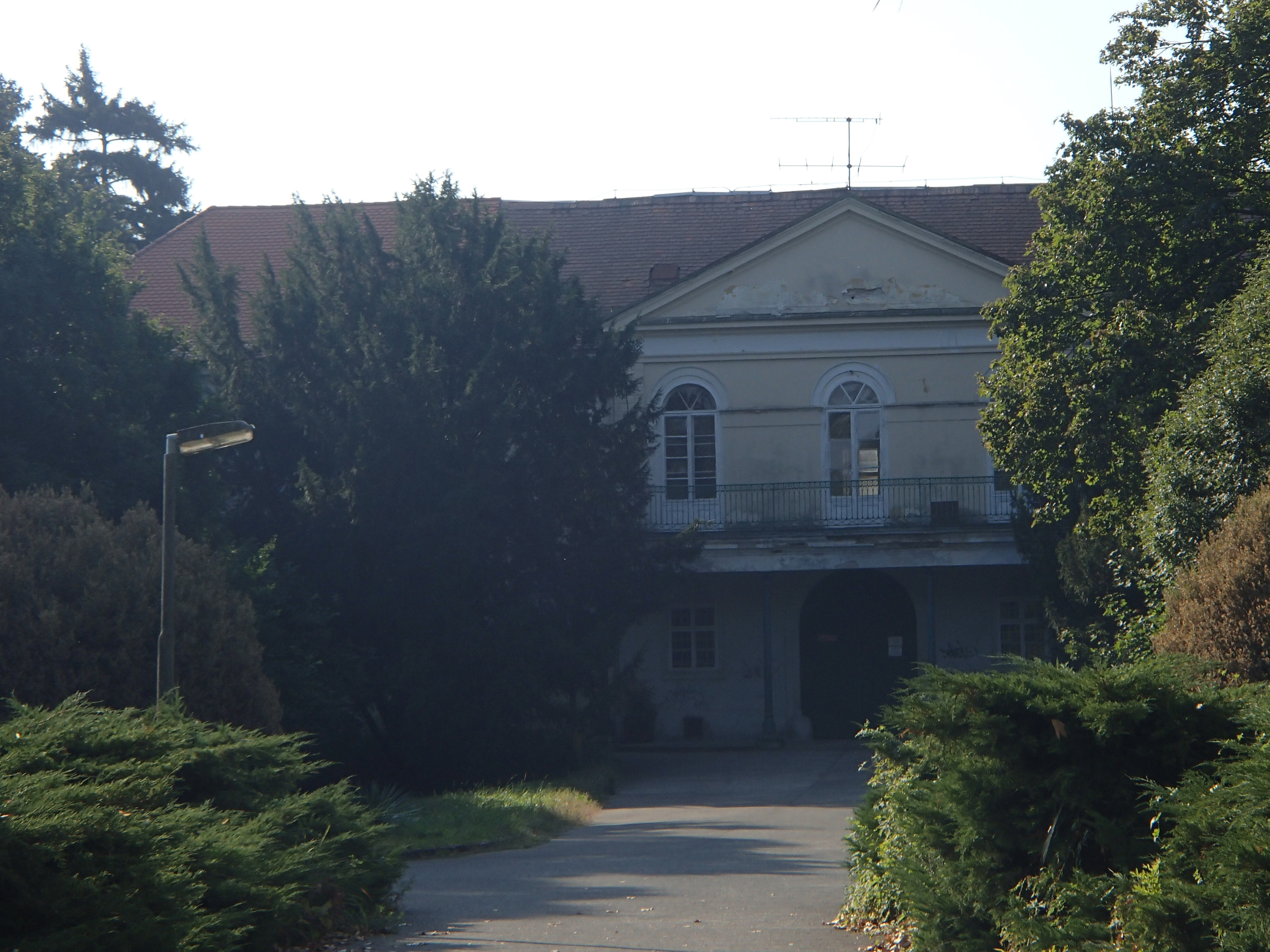
Apponyi Castle in Malinovo

The old castle at Ybrehart (today Malinovo) was acquired by Count György Apponyi, son of Lázár, in June 1763. It was reconstructed into its current form sometime after 1817 by Count György Apponyi (1780–1849), eldest son of Antal György. It then went to his son György Apponyi who died in the castle in 1899. Albert Apponyi lost property of the castle following the Treaty of Trianon. It became an agricultural school in 1923, a function it still serves despite an obvious need for repair.

=== Jablánc (today Jablonica, Slovakia) ===
The manor in Jabloncza, inherited by the family in 1772, was remodeled by József Apponyi around the time of his elevation as Count in 1808, possibly to better reflect his new higher status. It was again remodeled in the late 19th century by Count Antal Apponyi (1852–1920), who inherited it from József's son Rezső Apponyi. After World War I it changed hands several times and eventually went into disrepair. In 2017 it was purchased by a non-profit group that intends to renovate it and convert into a hotel and cultural facility.

=== Hőgyész (Hungary) ===
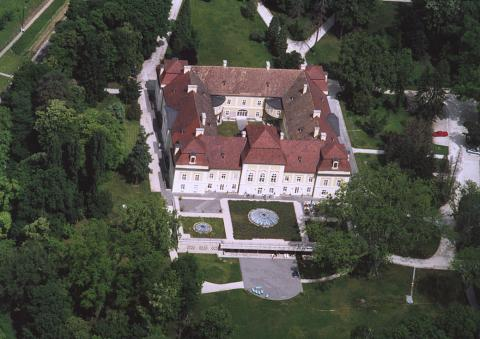
Apponyi Castle, Hőgyész

The Hőgyész domain in Tolna County was acquired in 1722 by Count Claude Florimond de Mercy, and purchased by György Apponyi (son of Lázár) in 1772. It was rebuilt in the late 18th century by György's son, Count Antal György Apponyi, who spent much of the rest of his life there. The castle later went to Antal George's grandson Károly Apponyi (1805–1890), his son Géza (1853–1927) and the latter's son Károly (1878–1959) who sold it to the Hungarian state in 1939. During and after World War II it became a center for displaced people and military hospital, and later a school. It was privatized in 1999 and renovated into a luxury hotel, but was embroiled in the troubles of controversial financier Ghaith Pharaon which led to its closing in the 2010s.

=== Lengyel (Hungary) ===
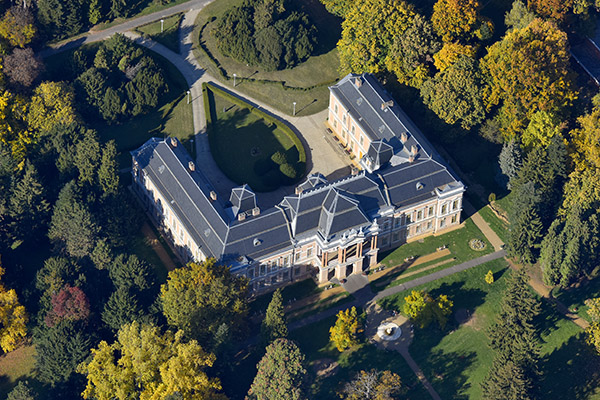
Apponyi Castle, Lengyel

The Swabian village of Lengyel ("Polish" in Hungarian) in Tolna County was purchased by Count Antal György Apponyi in 1799. The castle was built by Antal György's third son József in 1824–1829 and extensively remodeled from 1878 by Sándor Apponyi. It suffered fire damage in 1905. After Sándor's passing away, his widow Countess Alexandra Esterházy donated the castle in 1926 to the Hungarian National Museum but kept the privilege of living there until her death in 1930. During World War II it was used by Hungary's National Cartography Office, then became a Russian military hospital from January to March 1945, and later that year an internment camp for displaced Germans. It has been an agricultural school since 1946.

=== Urban properties ===
The Apponyis inhabited various properties in the capitals cities of Vienna, Pressburg (Pozsony, today's Bratislava) and Budapest, many of which were rented. The Apponyi Palace in Bratislava, built by Count György Apponyi (1736–1782), was sold in 1865 to the municipality of Pressburg. The Palais Apponyi in Vienna was built in 1880 for Marguerite and Lajos Apponyi. Albert Apponyi lived in an old house on Castle Hill in Budapest, now Táncsics Mihály utca 17, where a plaque honors his memory and that of his son György.

=== Other ===
- The medieval castle in Cseklész (Slovak: Čeklís, near Bernolákovo, Slovakia) was held by the family before they switched it for the Appony domain in 1392. It has been ruined since the 16th century.
- A branch of the Apponyi family inherited the Korlátka castle in the village of Korlátkő (now Cerová, Slovakia), following the extinction of the Korlathkeőy family in 1546. That "Korlátkő line" of the family ended with the 1637 death of Baron Balázs Apponyi without male heirs.
- Some time after 1580 Balázs Apponyi built a castle in Lészkó (now Lieskové in Cerová, Slovakia), as the old Korlátkő castle was no longer suitable for the lifestyle of his time. His widow Borbála remained there after his death, but the Apponyi family subsequently no longer owned it. It is now a Catholic charity home.
- Balázs Apponyi also owned a castle in Pereszlény (now Preseľany, Slovakia), now destroyed.
- The now-destroyed castle in Bánov (Czech Republic), despite being in Moravia and not in the Kingdom of Hungary, was acquired by Balázs Apponyi in 1630 and stayed in the family's property until 1658.
- The Appony line of the family owned the village castle in Kovarce (Hungarian: Kovarc) (today in Slovakia) from 1876 to 1926.
- A roadside mansion in Bátaapáti in Tolna County (Hungary), was built by the Apponyis in the 1840s and renovated in 2005–2006.
- A manor in Medina (Tolna County), built in 1840 and purchased by the Apponyis in 1850, has been renovated as a hotel branded Apponyi Kiskastély (Little Castle of Apponyi).
- A manor in Pálfa (Tolna County) was built in 1924–1928 by Géza Apponyi (1853–1927) and his son Károly (1878–1959), who died there. Géza was the son of Károly Apponyi, eldest son of Count Antal Apponyi's eldest son György (of the Malinovo line). The domain of Pálfa was apparently acquired by the family in 1772 together with Hőgyész. The building now serves as a home for disabled people.
- There are many, many other properties that the Apponyi family supposedly owned during their time within the Kingdom but also all over Europe
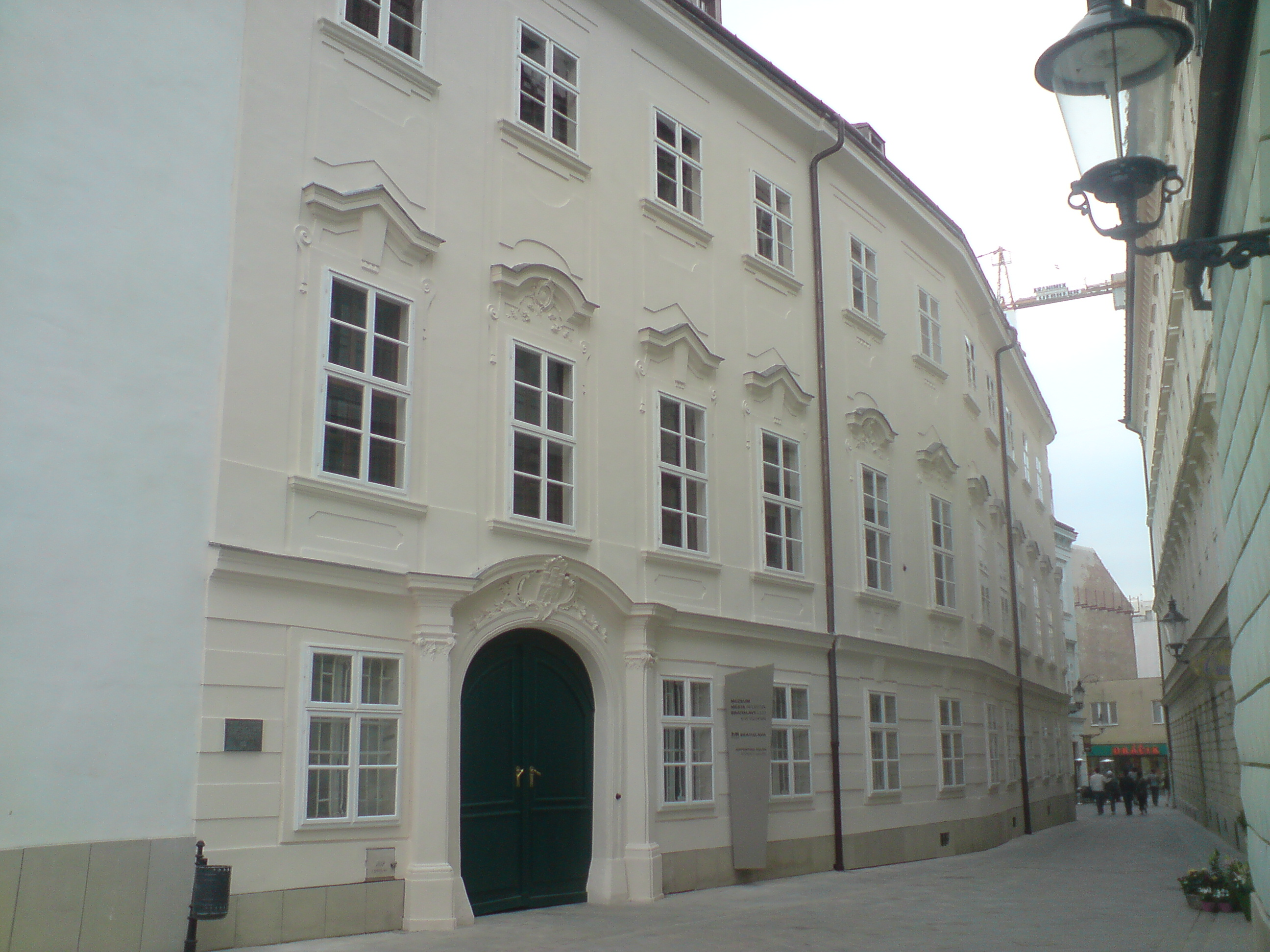
Apponyi Palace, Bratislava

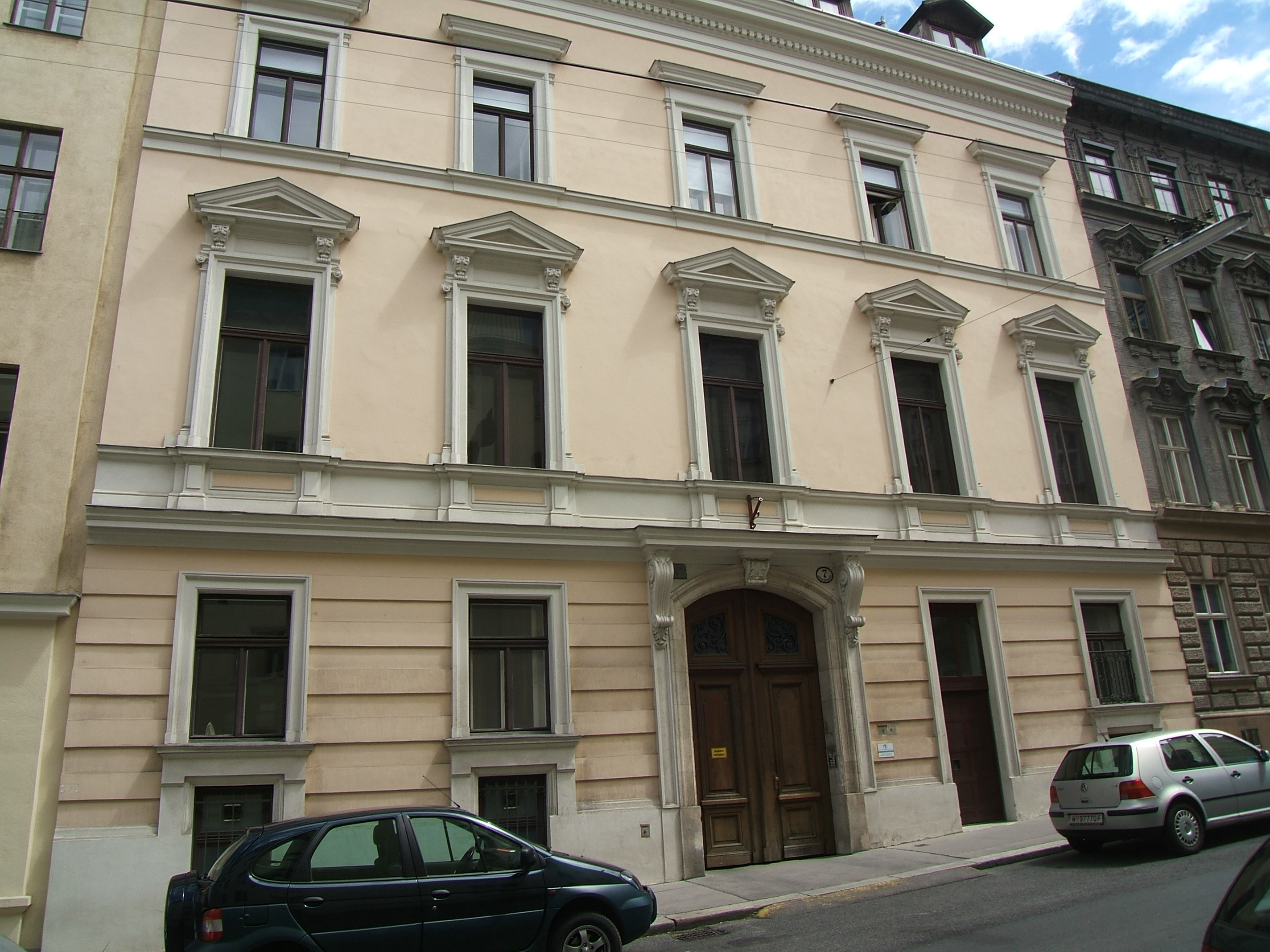
Palais Apponyi, Vienna

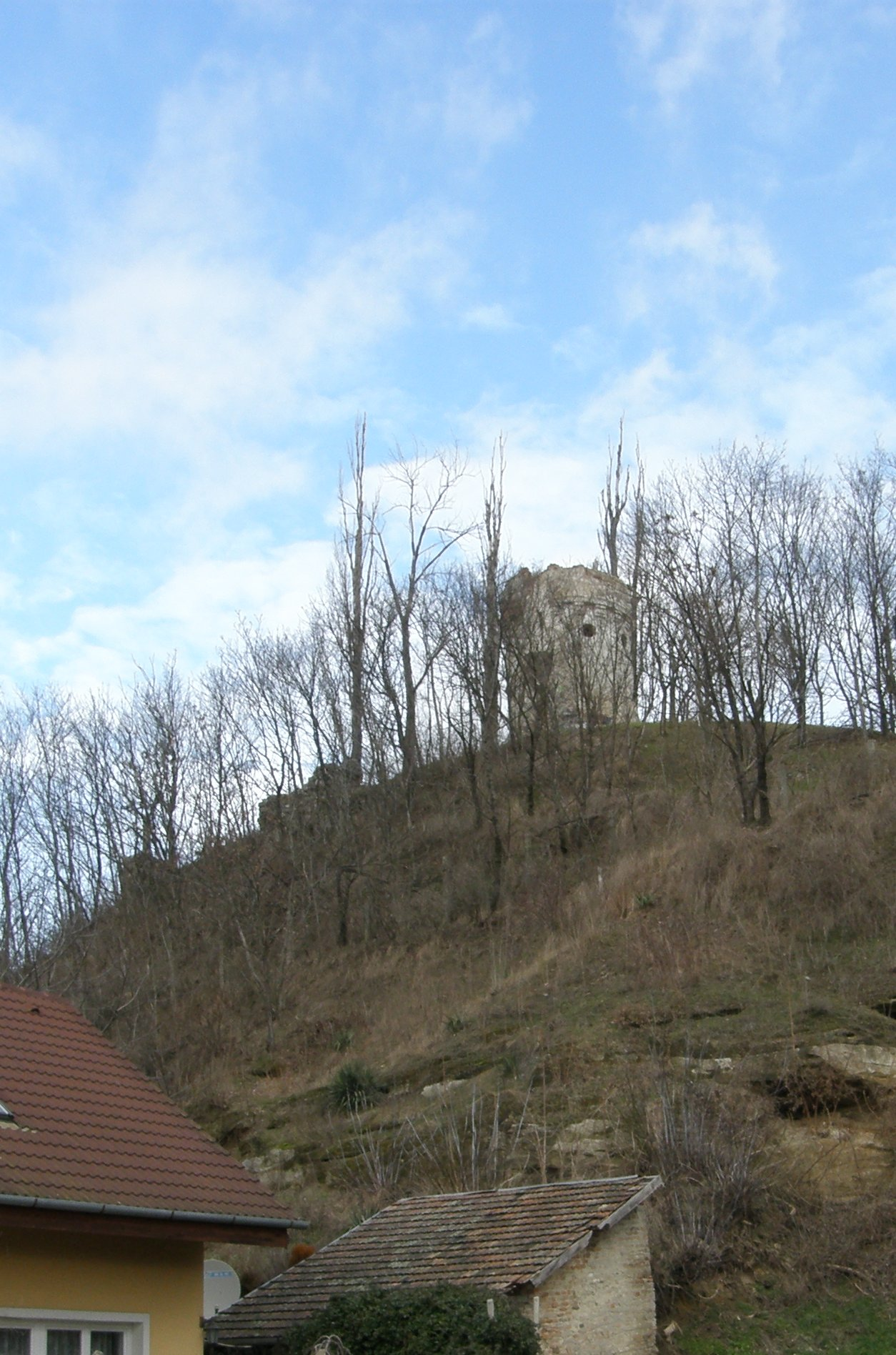
Site of Cseklész castle

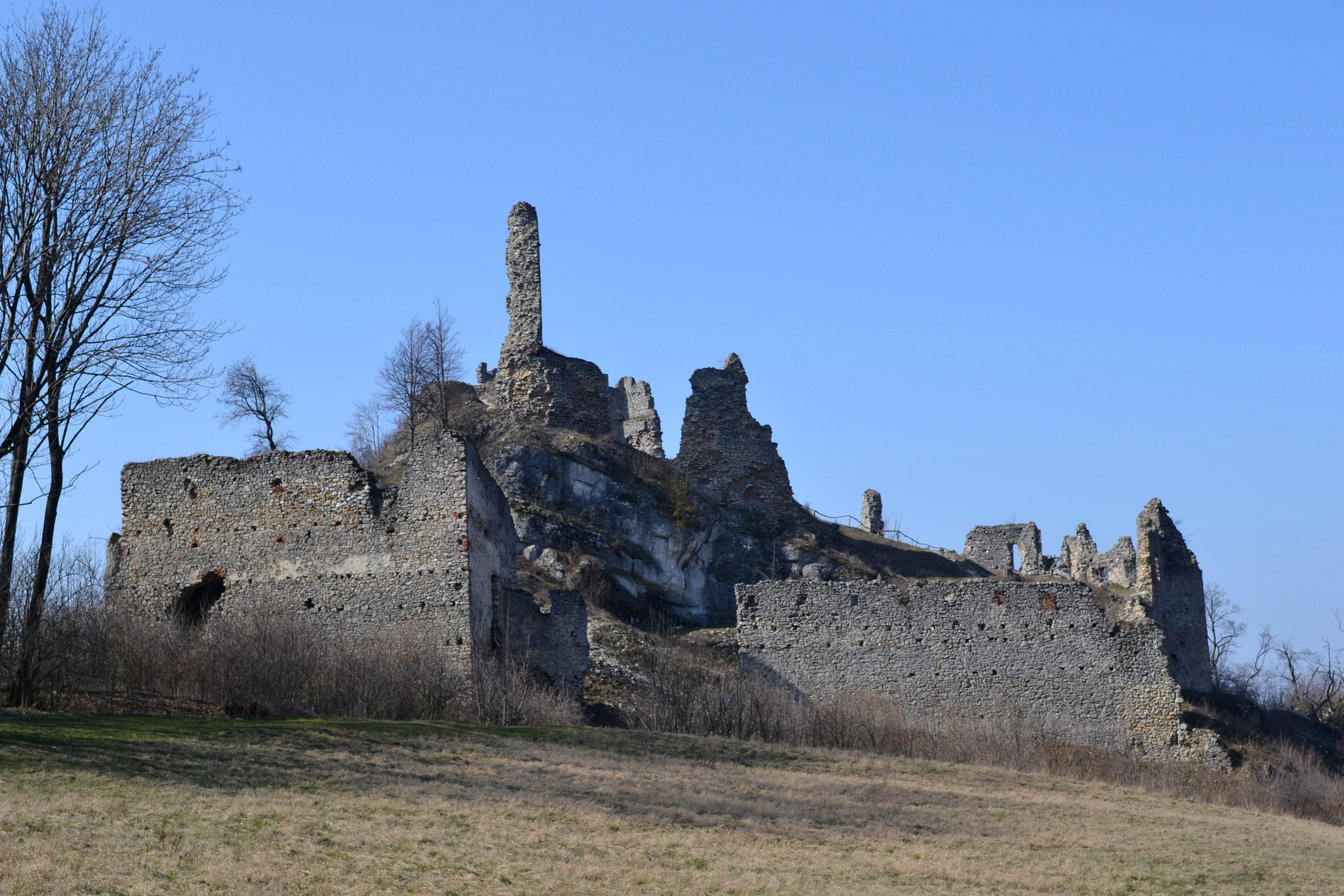
Ruins of Korlátka castle

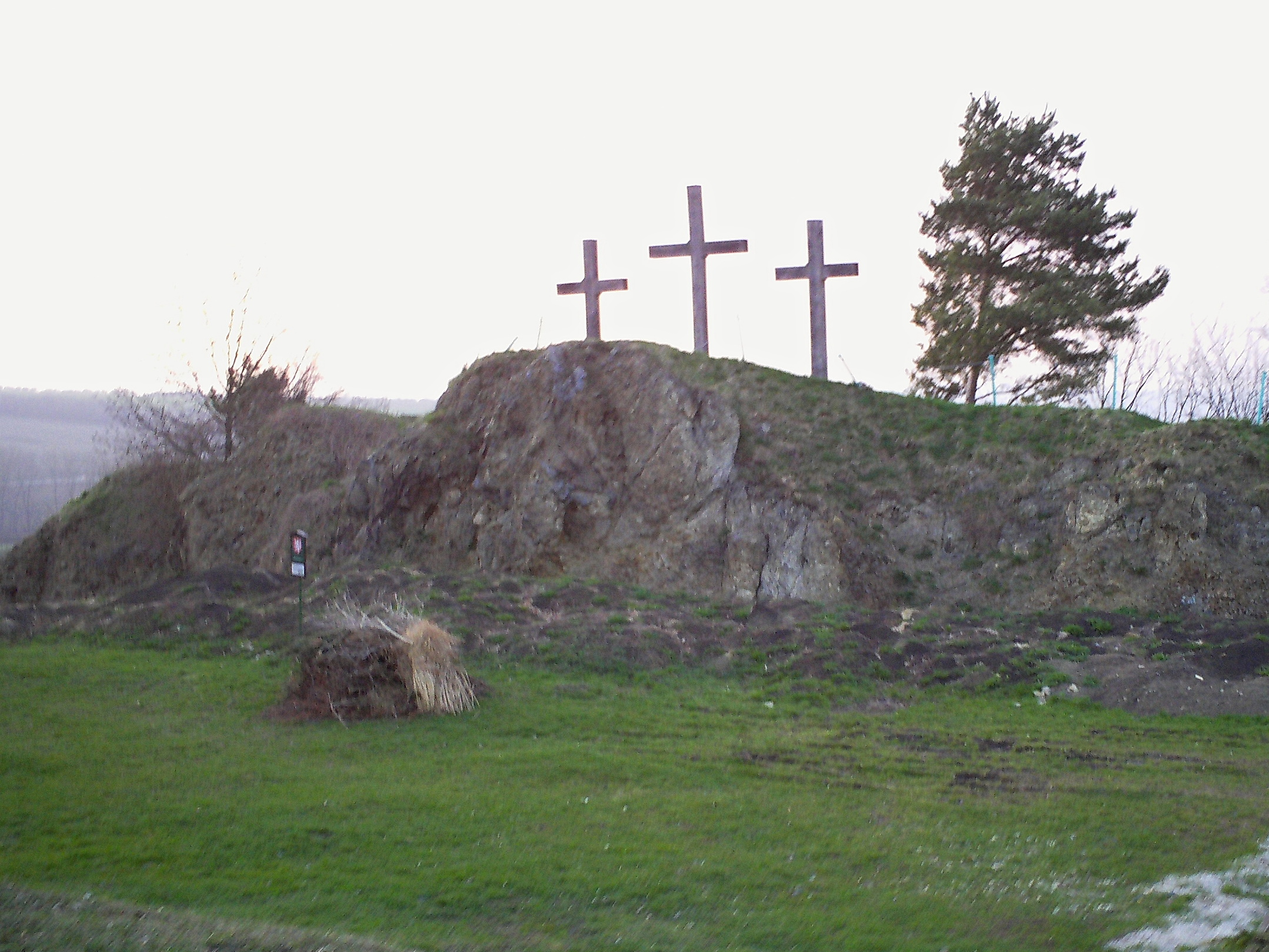
Site of Bánov castle

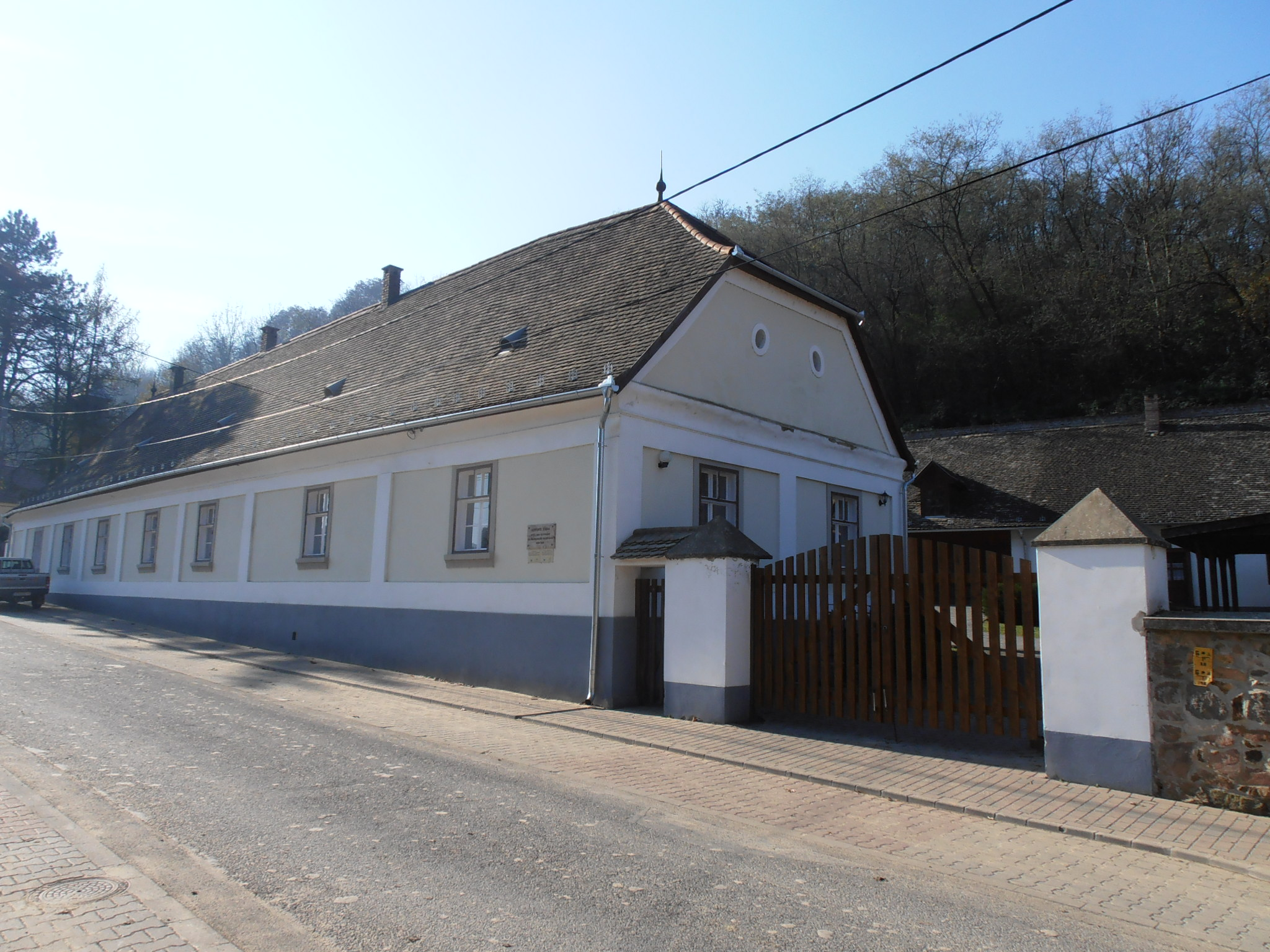
Apponyi mansion, Bátaapáti

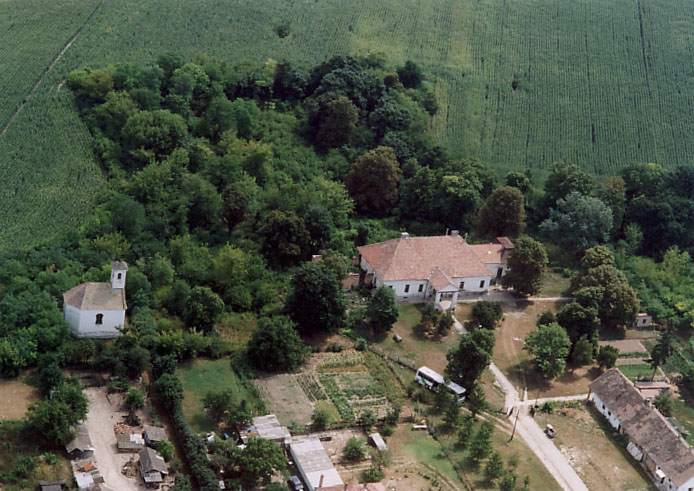
Apponyi manor, Medina

== Bibliophilia ==
The Apponyi Library (Bibliotheca Apponiana) was created around 1774 by Count Anton György Apponyi in Vienna, who took advantage for its build-up of the abolition of the monasteries by Joseph II. In 1827 it was moved to Pressburg in a dedicated building on Kozia Street, and on to Appony in 1846. It was partly dispersed in stages from the late 19th century to the eve of World War II, and what was left in Apponyi Castle deteriorated during the Communist era. It was restored in the early 21st century and reopened in 2011 as part of the Slovak National Library.

Count Sándor Apponyi's extensive collection of books and incunables was kept at Lengyel Castle. This included a collection of Hungary-related prints or Hungarica, and a separate collection of items he called rariora et curiosa, mostly in French, Latin and Italian. Part of the latter collection was specifically dedicated to the history of Verona and the local Nogarol[l]a family from which his grandmother (Antal's wife Teresa) stemmed, including the late medieval humanist Isotta Nogarola. Sándor donated the whole collection to Hungary's National Széchényi Library in 1926. A special law adopted in 1926 by the Hungarian National Assembly to acknowledge the donation of the collection mentions several other comparable donations, but adds that "Among all these generous, valuable donations, that of Count [Sándor] Apponyi is by far the most important."

== See also ==
- Oponice (Hungarian: Appony)
- List of titled noble families in the Kingdom of Hungary
