= Lengyel =

Lengyel _{Lendl}
- Village
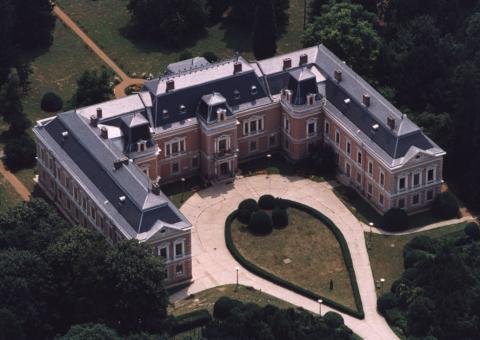
- Aerial photography: Lengyel, Apponyi Castle

- Location of Lengyel
- Coordinates: 46.37°N 18.367°E
- Country: Hungary
- Region: Southern Transdanubia
- County: Tolna
- Subregion: Bonyhádi

Area
  - Total: 20.03 km^{2} (7.73 sq mi)

Population (2004)
  - Total: 652
  - Density: 26.41/km^{2} (68.4/sq mi)
- Time zone: UTC+1 (CET)
  - Summer (DST): UTC+2 (CEST)
- Postal code: 7184
- Area code: 74

Lengyel (literally: "Polish, Pole", German: Lendl) is the highest inhabited village in Tolna County, Hungary. It is located between Bonyhád and Dombóvár. It was long held by the Apponyi family following its purchase by Count Antal György Apponyi in 1799. After approximately 200 years of residency, Lengyel's ethnic German Danube Swabian population was dispossessed of its property and forcibly removed to Germany following the end of World War II.

Lengyel culture is named after the village.

== Cultural events ==
- Annabál
- Pollen Youth Rock Festival

== Points of interest ==
Lengyel's Castle was built by Count Antal György Apponyi's third son József in 1824–1829 and extensively remodeled from 1878 by . It suffered fire damage in 1905. After Sándor's death, his widow Countess Alexandra Esterházy donated the castle in 1926 to the Hungarian National Museum but kept the privilege of living there until her death in 1930. During World War II it was used by Hungary's National Cartography Office, then became a Russian military hospital from January to March 1945, and later that year an internment camp for displaced Germans. After 1946 it became an agricultural school. It is surrounded by 22 hectares of park with botanical rarities.

The village church has a crypt of the Lengyel line of the Apponyi family, with the tombs of Rudolf Apponyi and his wife Anna (née von Benckendorff) and of Sándor Apponyi and his wife Alexandra (née Esterházy).

Other points of interest:

- Kindergarten museum
- Svájceráj (a stable built in the Swiss fashion from the 19th century)
- The post office and kindergarten building (The first Apponyi manor house, which is smaller in size)
- Anna Bath - With 100 hectares of forested park, a school, a lake, and a small zoo.
- Sánci Peak (A historical area protected by Mór Wosinsky) with a panorama of the Kapos Valley.

== People ==
- Sándor Apponyi
- János Bogdán (hu)
- József Cserháti (hu)
- Mór Wosinsky (hu)

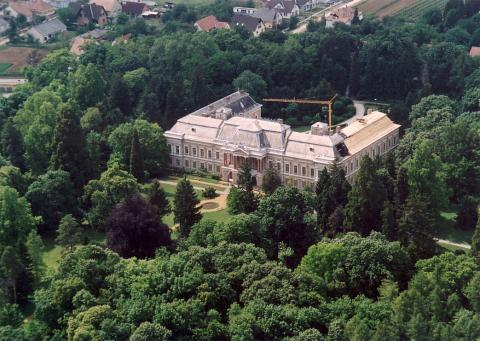
Apponyi Castle

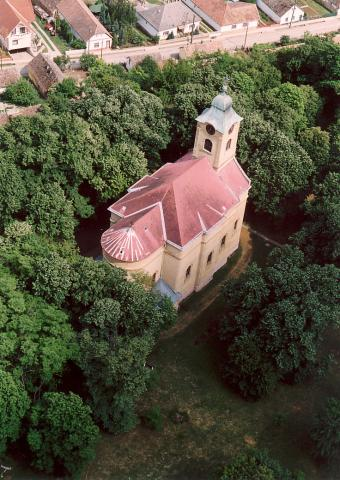
Lengyel church

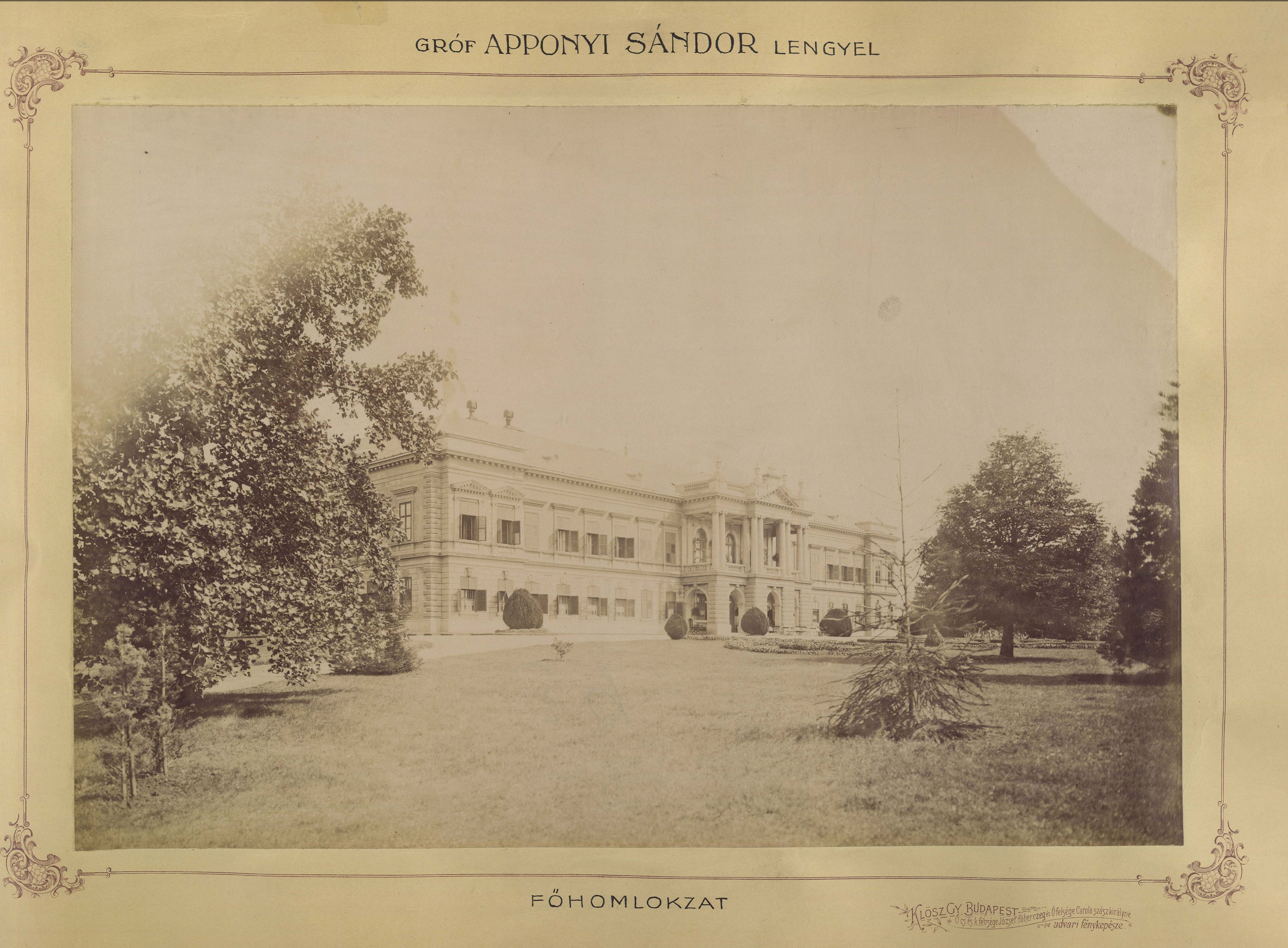
an old postcard of the Apponyi Castle
