= Kovarce =

Kovarce Kovarc
- Municipality
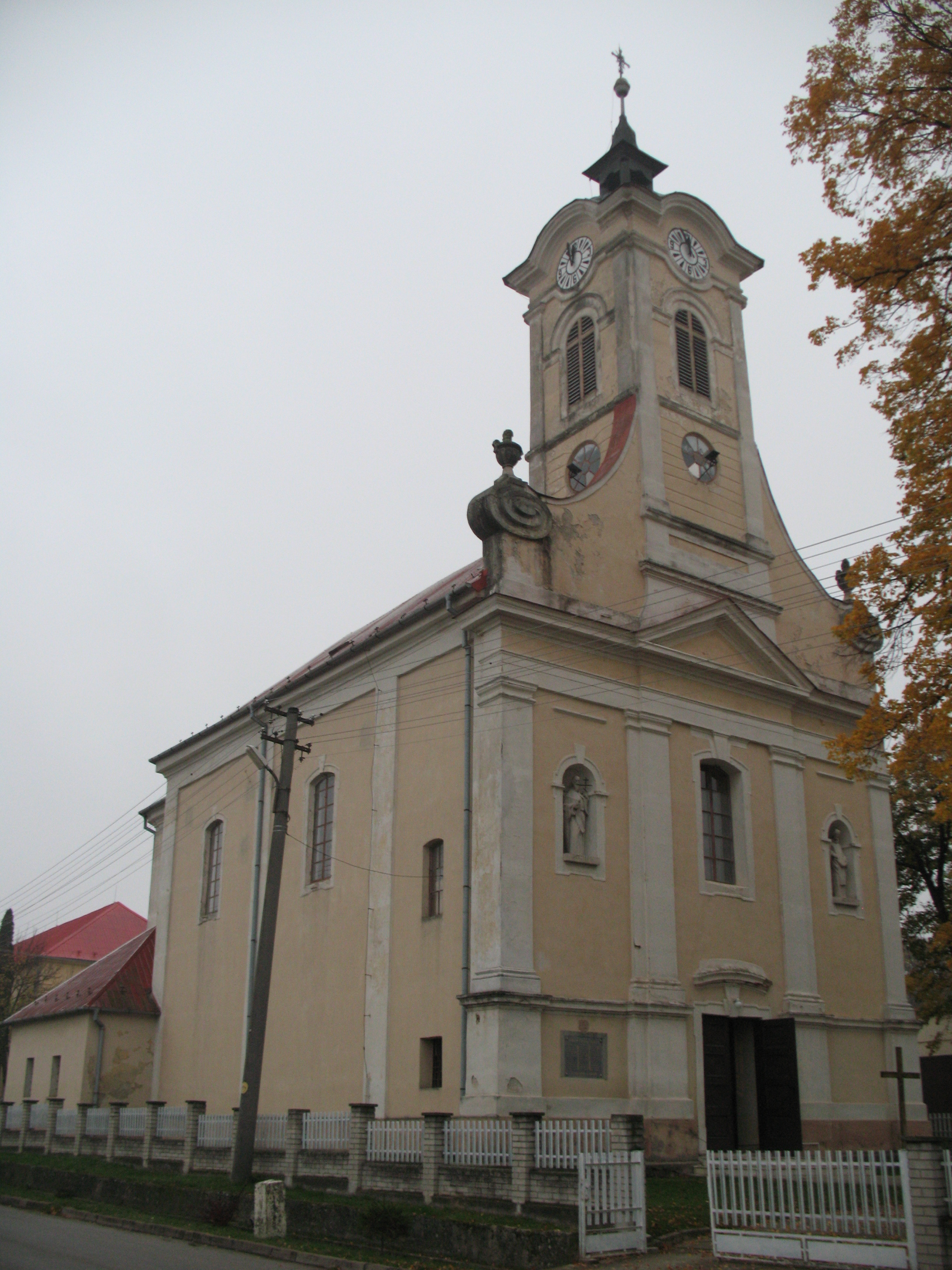
- Saint Nicholas church

- Flag

- Location of Kovarce in the Nitra Region Location of Kovarce in Slovakia
- Coordinates: 48.50°N 18.17°E
- Country: Slovakia
- Region: Nitra Region
- District: Topoľčany District
- First mentioned: 1280

Area
  - Total: 25.04 km^{2} (9.67 sq mi)
- Elevation: 162 m (531 ft)

Population (2025)
  - Total: 1,502
- Time zone: UTC+1 (CET)
  - Summer (DST): UTC+2 (CEST)
- Postal code: 956 15
- Area code: +421 38
- Vehicle registration plate (until 2022): TO
- Website: obeckovarce.sk

Kovarce (German: Kowarz or Kowaritz; Hungarian: Kovarc) is a municipality in the Topoľčany District of the Nitra Region, Slovakia. In 2011 it had 1581 inhabitants.

== Geography ==
The municipality lies at an altitude of 162 metres (531 ft) and covers an area of 25.04 km^{2} (9.67 sq mi) (2025).

== History ==
Kovarce dates back at least to the late 13th century, in the Hungarian Kingdom, when it was the property of the Ludanick family. It was seized by Matthew III Csák during the troubles of the early 14th century. In 1395, it became property of the Apponyi family. It fell to Turkish attacks in 1530, 1599 and 1663. In 1663–1685, a period of Ottoman rule between the fourth Austro-Turkish war and the War of the Holy League, it was part of the Uyvar Province as an administrative unit of the Nahiye of Nitra.

In 1864 a sugar refinery was built in the village. A daughter of the sugar refinery's founder, Anton Wels, was the maternal grandmother of Audrey Hepburn.

== Population ==
Population statistic (10 years)
Year	1995	2005	2015	2025
Count	1608	1576	1621	1502
Difference		−1.99%	+2.85%	−7.34%

Population statistic
Year	2024	2025
Count	1515	1502
Difference		−0.85%

It has a population of 1502 people (31 December 2025).

=== Ethnicity ===
Census 2021 (1+ %)
Ethnicity	Number	Fraction
Slovak	1499	94.93%
Not found out	82	5.19%
Total	1579	

In year 2021 was 1579 people by ethnicity 1499 as Slovak, 82 as Not found out, 7 as Czech, 7 as Other, 4 as Hungarian, 2 as Ukrainian, 2 as Russian, 1 as Italian, 1 as Rusyn and 1 as Austrian.

Note on population: The difference values of population numbers in the table "Population statistic" and in the sections "Ethnicity" & "Religion" is caused by the use of various statistical methods.

=== Religion ===
Census 2021 (1+ %)
Religion	Number	Fraction
Roman Catholic Church	1156	73.21%
None	290	18.37%
Not found out	75	4.75%
Evangelical Church	31	1.96%
Total	1579	

In year 2021 was 1579 people by religion 1156 from Roman Catholic Church, 290 from None, 75 from Not found out, 31 from Evangelical Church, 8 from Christian Congregations in Slovakia, 6 from Greek Catholic Church, 4 from Ad hoc movements, 3 from Other, 2 from Buddhism, 1 from Eastern Orthodox Church, 1 from Paganism and natural spirituality, 1 from Other and not ascertained christian church and 1 from Apostolic Church.

== Points of interest ==
The former castle stands in the midst of the village. The Wels family purchased it from its last aristocratic owners and remodeled it by building a second floor, then sold it to the Apponyi family after the death of Anton Wels in 1876. The Apponyis appear not to have lived there but rented it, to the local Rosenthal brothers until 1906. From 1906 the castle was rented to American businessman (and in 1912 Titanic survivor) Thomas Cardeza, a grandson of the founder of Fidelity Trust Company in Philadelphia, and his French-born wife Mary (née Racine and descendant of Jean Racine), both of whom had lived between 1903 and 1906 in nearby Nitrianska Streda. The Cardezas also made transformations, including building the southern wing's second floor, and kept a small zoo including bears and monkeys in the castle's garden. They left Kovarce after the American entry into World War I in April 1917, but kept renting the property until 1920. In late 1926, Count Henrik Apponyi sold it to the Czechoslovak Government which transformed it into an institution for war invalids. In 1953, it became an institution for mentally ill patients, which it still is under the name "Clementia".

Another mansion in the village, initially built in the 18th century, is now privately owned.

Saint Nicholas Church, in the center of the village, dates back to the 18th century.

Saint Anne Church, on a hill dominating the village, was built in the 19th century in the neo-Gothic style.

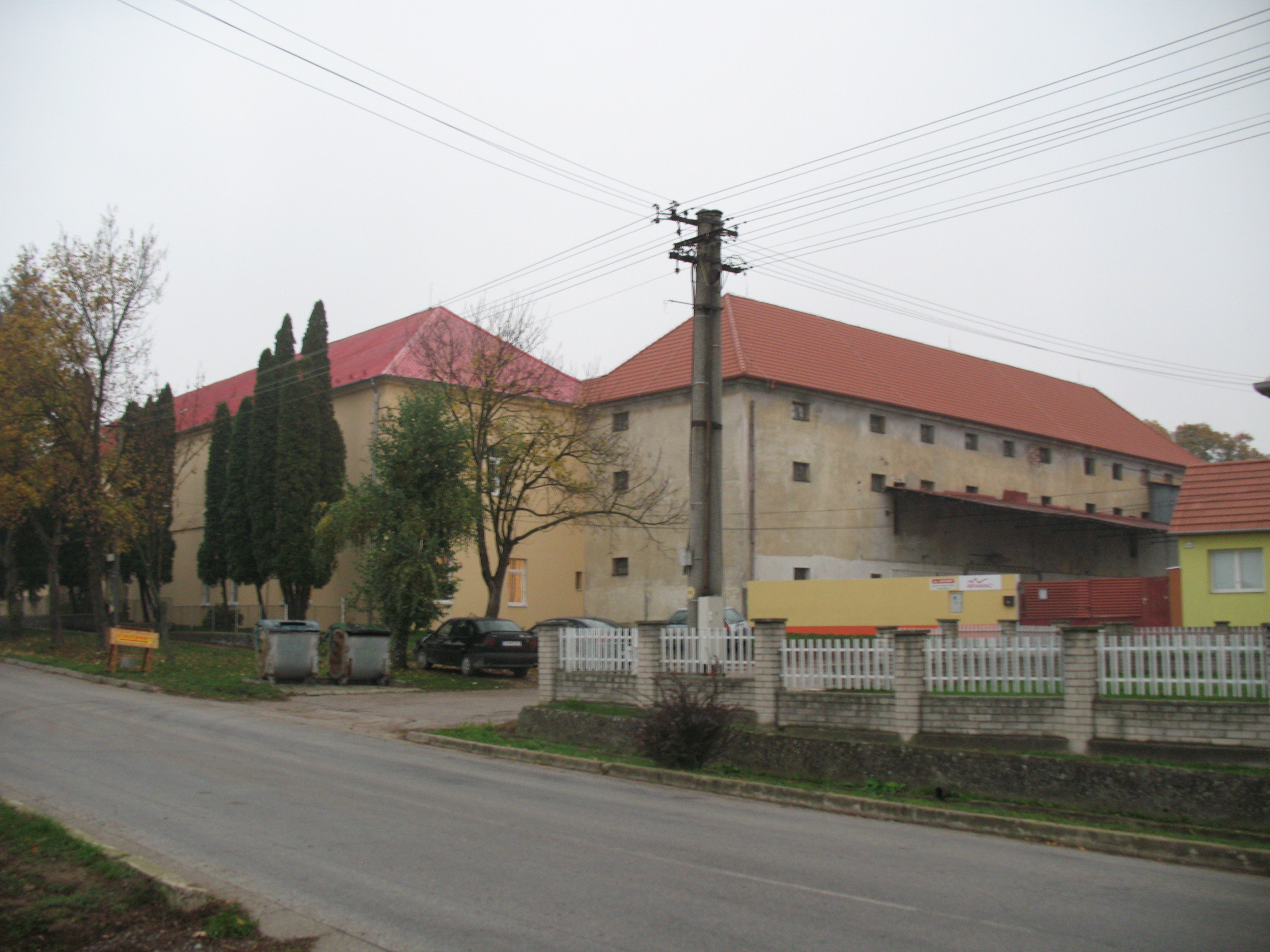
Former castle, now Clementia institution

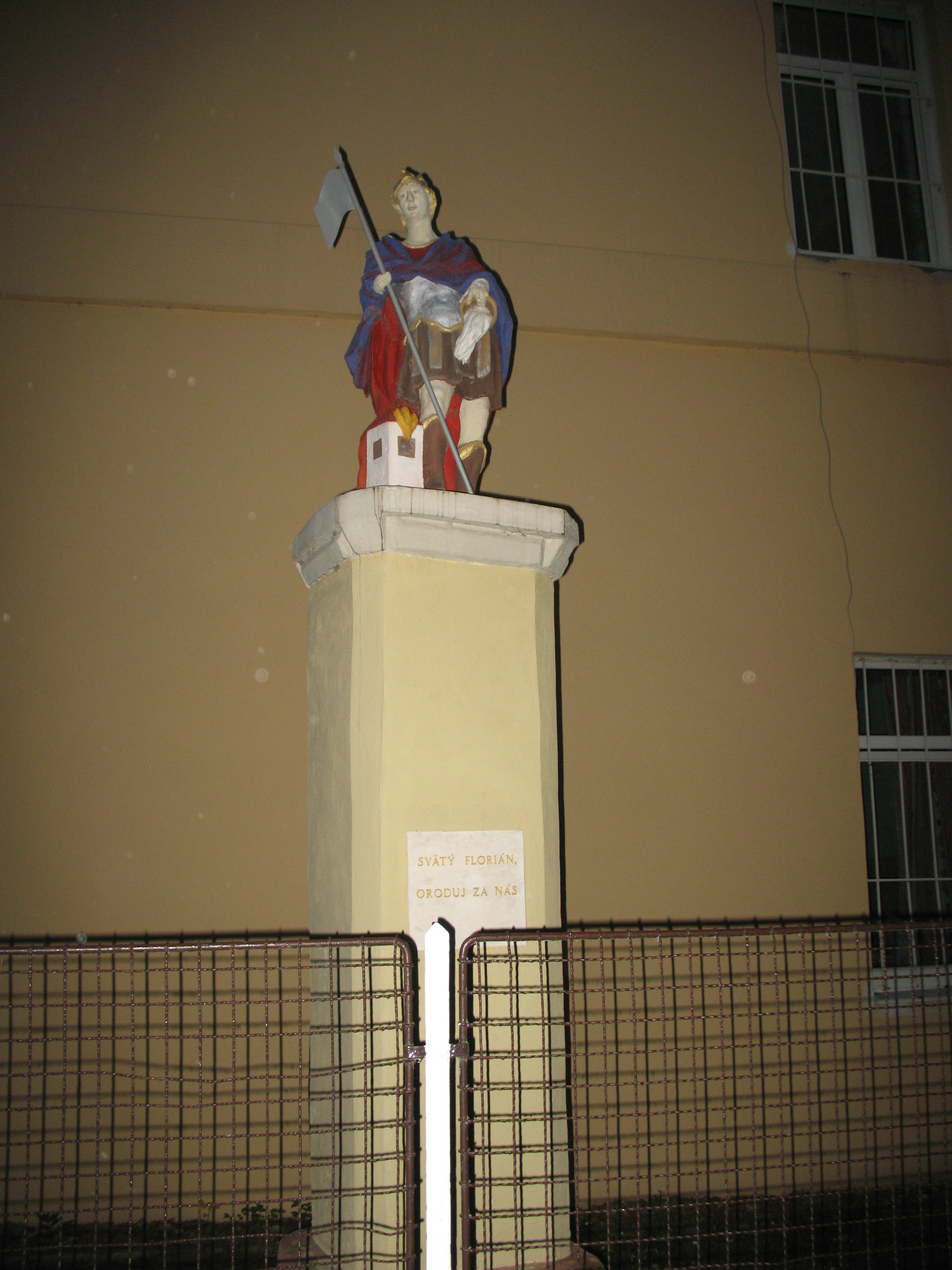
Statue of Saint Florian in front of the former castle

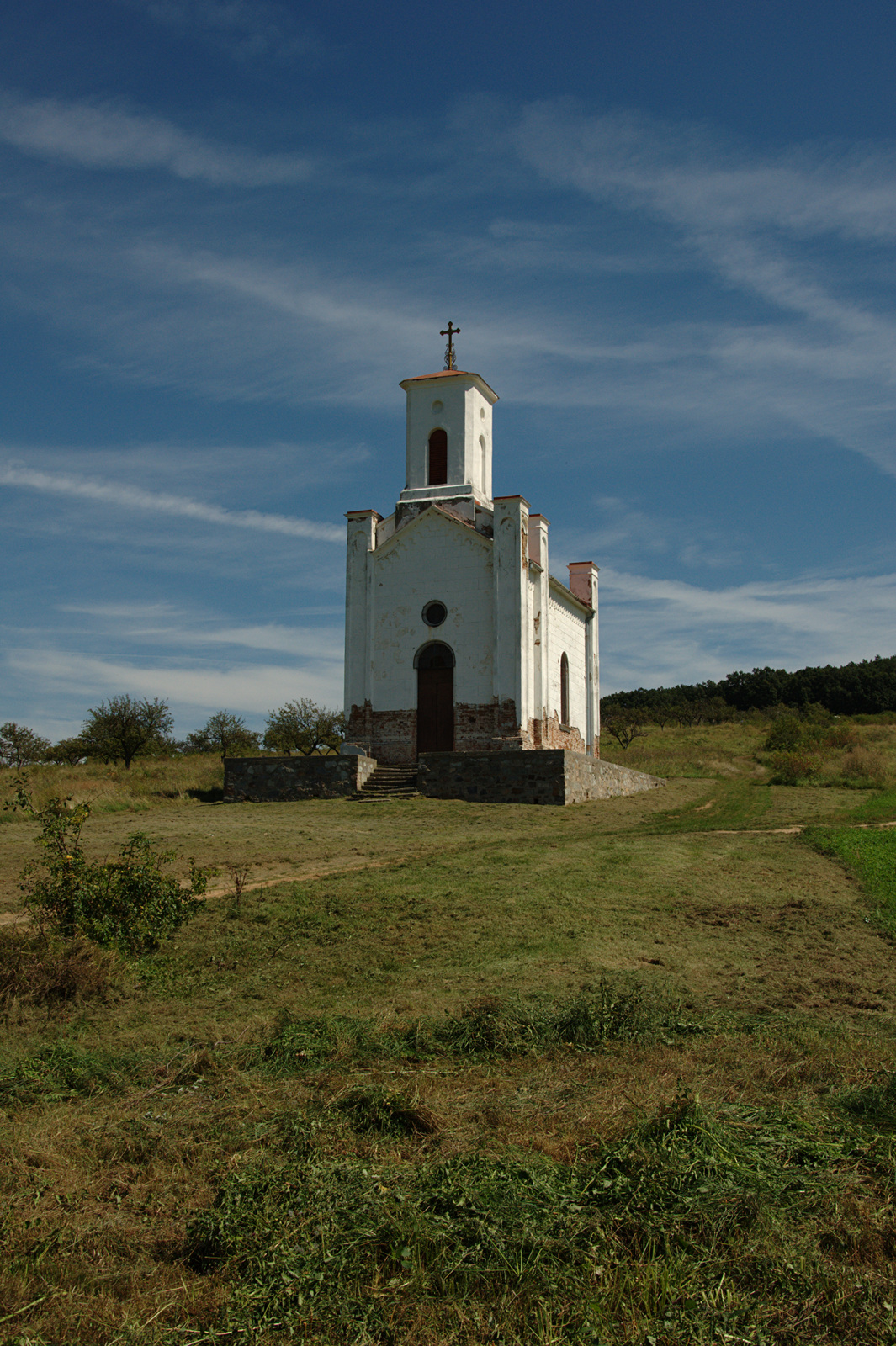
St Anne Church

== See also ==
- List of municipalities and towns in Slovakia

== Genealogical resources ==
The records for genealogical research are available at the state archive "Statny Archiv in Nitra, Slovakia"

- Roman Catholic church records (births/marriages/deaths): 1698-1932 (parish A)
