= Medina, Hungary =

Medina Медина
- Coat of arms

- Location of Tolna county in Hungary

- Location of Medina, Hungary
- Coordinates: 46.47363°N 18.64154°E
- Country: Hungary
- County: Tolna

Area
  - Total: 22.24 km^{2} (8.59 sq mi)

Population (2004)
  - Total: 856
  - Density: 38.48/km^{2} (99.7/sq mi)
- Time zone: UTC+1 (CET)
  - Summer (DST): UTC+2 (CEST)
- Postal code: 7057
- Area code: 74

Medina (Serbian Cyrillic: Медина) is a village in Tolna County, central Hungary. The majority of residents in the village are ethnic Hungarians, with traditional minorities of Serbs and Romani people. A historical manor house that once belonged to the Apponyi family is now operated as a boutique hotel.

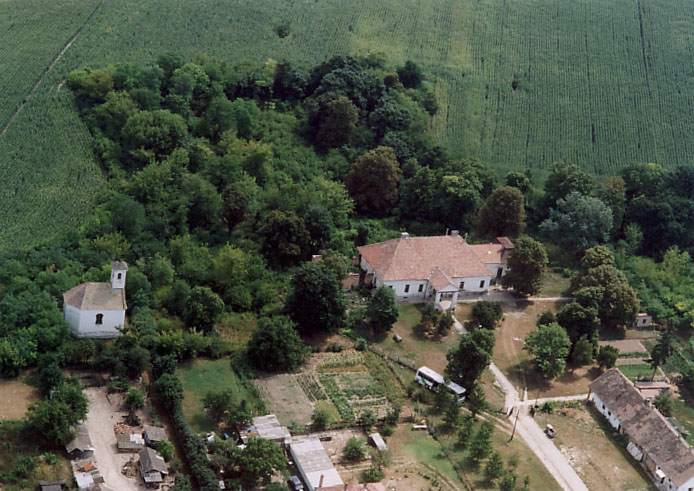
Medina, aerial view with Apponyi manor

== Twin municipalities or villages ==
- (Croatia) Borovo
