= Hőgyész =

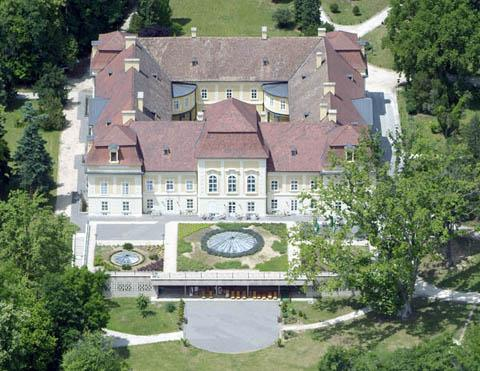
- Castle in Hőgyész

- Coat of arms

- Location of Tolna county in Hungary

- Location within Hungary
- Coordinates: 46°29′47″N 18°25′06″E
- Country: Hungary
- County: Tolna

Area
  - Total: 37.1 km^{2} (14.3 sq mi)

Population (2011)
  - Total: 2,895
  - Density: 78.0/km^{2} (202/sq mi)
- Time zone: UTC+1 (CET)
  - Summer (DST): UTC+2 (CEST)
- Postal code: 7191 7193 7195
- Area code: 74
- Website: www.hogyesz.hu

Hőgyész (German: Hidjess or Hidjeß) is a village in Tolna County, Hungary. It is the birthplace of the Slovak Impressionist painter Jozef Teodor Mousson and has a large castle of the Apponyi family.

The Hőgyész domain in Tolna County was acquired in 1722 by Count Claude Florimond de Mercy, and purchased by Count György Apponyi (1736–1782) in 1772. It was rebuilt in the late 18th century by György's son, Count Antal György Apponyi, who spent much of his later life there. The castle later went to Antal George's grandson Károly Apponyi (1805–1890), his son Géza (1853–1927) and the latter's son Károly (1878–1959) who sold it to the Hungarian state in 1939. During and after World War II it became a center for displaced people and military hospital, and later a school. It was privatized in 1999 and renovated into a luxury hotel, but was embroiled in the troubles of controversial financier Ghaith Pharaon which led to its closing in the 2010s.
