= Jozef Teodor Mousson =

- Born: 15 December 1887; Hőgyész, Kingdom of Hungary (today Hungary)
- Died: 6 November 1946 (aged 58); Trenčín, Czechoslovakia (today Slovakia)
- Known for: Painting
- Movement: Impressionism

Jozef Teodor Mousson (Slovak: [ˈjɔzef ˈteɔdɔr ˈmusɔn]; 15 December 1887 – 6 November 1946) was a Slovak Impressionist painter.

Born in a Hungarian village called Hőgyész to a family of a French origin, he moved to Michalovce, Slovakia in 1911, where he stayed for another 33 years. As a result, he is often referred to as "the painter of the Zemplín sun and people".

== Biography ==
Jozef Teodor Mousson was born on 15 December 1887 in a village called Hőgyész which lies in today Hungary's Tolna County. In his vital records his family name is spelt as Moussong, i.e. with a letter g at the end. His father worked as a teacher and his mother was a housewife. It is said that their ancestors came to Hungary from the Alsace region. Between 1905 and 1909 Mousson studied at the Hungarian University of Fine Arts in Budapest. He married Irena Grundová in 1910 whom he met during a study trip at the Lake Balaton. Shortly after the marriage he got an offer to teach in Michalovce, Slovakia. In 1911 he moved to Michalovce, where he served as a teacher until 1919. That's when he started his career as a professional painter. In 1942 he suffered an intracerebral hemorrhage and the whole left part of his body became paralysed. In 1946 he moved to Bratislava due to his bad physical and psychic state and later to his son in Trenčín, where he died.
