= Palais Apponyi =

Coordinates: 48°11′21.1″N 16°21′59.8″E

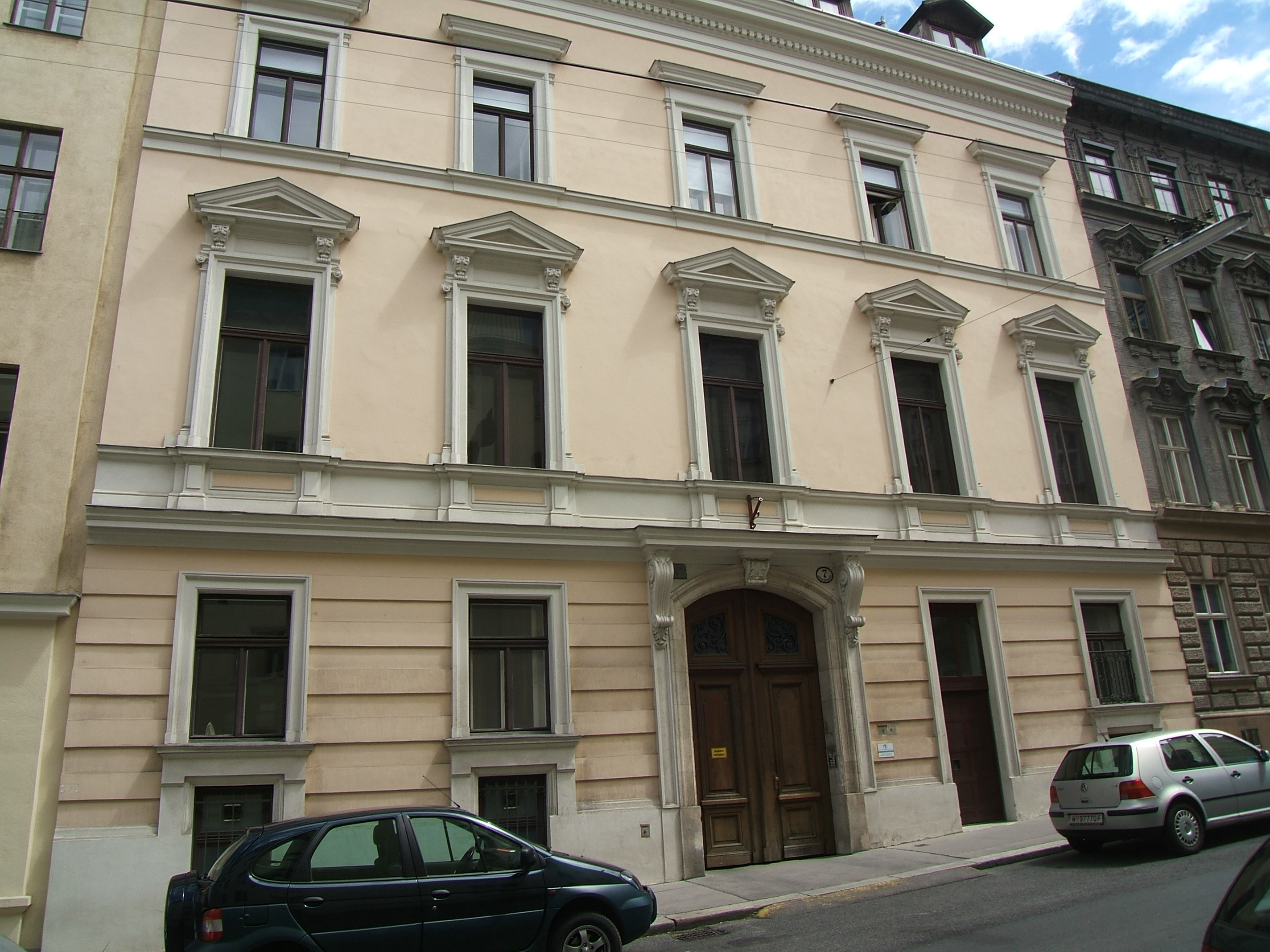
Street view of Palais Apponyi

The Palais Apponyi is a palatial building in the district of Wieden in Vienna, Austria. Its address is Johann-Strauss-Gasse 7.

It was built in 1880 on plans from Viktor Rumpelmayer for Countess Margarita Apponyi, wife of Count Lajos Apponyi. It is now the seat of Burschenschaft Albia, an academic fraternity.
