= Bánov (Uherské Hradiště District) =

- Municipality
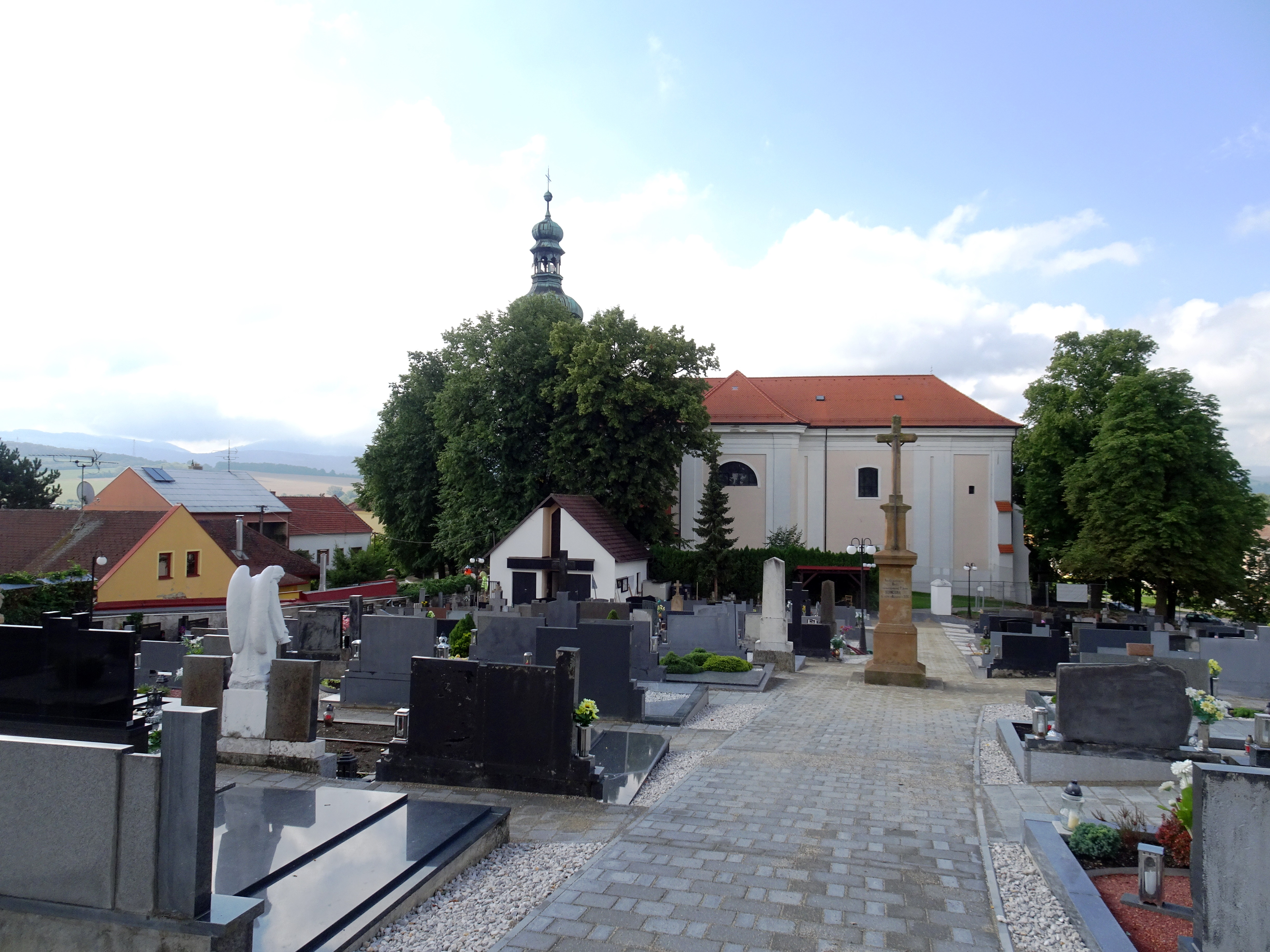
- Church of Saint Martin

- Flag Coat of arms

- Location in the Czech Republic
- Coordinates: 48°59′17″N 17°43′3″E
- Country: Czech Republic
- Region: Zlín
- District: Uherské Hradiště
- First mentioned: 1091

Area
  - Total: 16.18 km^{2} (6.25 sq mi)
- Elevation: 287 m (942 ft)

Population (2026-01-01)
  - Total: 2,164
  - Density: 133.7/km^{2} (346.4/sq mi)
- Time zone: UTC+1 (CET)
  - Summer (DST): UTC+2 (CEST)
- Postal code: 687 54
- Website: obec-banov.cz

Bánov is a municipality and village in Uherské Hradiště District in the Zlín Region of the Czech Republic. It has about 2,200 inhabitants.

== Geography ==
Bánov is located about 20 kilometres (12 mi) southeast of Uherské Hradiště and 26 km (16 mi) south of Zlín. The northern part of the municipal territory with the built-up area lies in the Vizovice Highlands and the southern part lies in the White Carpathians mountain range. The highest point is at 605 m (1,985 ft) above sea level.

== History ==
The first written mention of Bánov is in Chronica Boemorum and is related to the year 1091, when Bohemian Duke Bretislav II settled in a gord of Bánov. In the 12th century, the gord was rebuilt into a castle. At the beginning of the 13th century, Bánov was acquired by Jindřich Vítkovec from the Vítkovci family, who later became known as Jindřich of Hradec. Lords of Hradec owned Bánov until 1339, when they exchanged it for Telč with King John of Bohemia and Bánov thus became royal property. Due to its proximity to the border with Kingdom of Hungary, the castle was used for defensive purposes, but it was demolished during the Hussite Wars and disappeared during the 15th century.

In 1570, Bánov was promoted to a market town by Emperor Maximilian II, but it later lost the title.

== Demographics ==
Historical population

Year	Pop.	±%
1869	1,098	—
1880	1,167	+6.3%
1890	1,292	+10.7%
1900	1,543	+19.4%
1910	1,784	+15.6%

Year	Pop.	±%
1921	1,918	+7.5%
1930	1,911	−0.4%
1950	2,181	+14.1%
1961	2,391	+9.6%
1970	2,286	−4.4%

Year	Pop.	±%
1980	2,159	−5.6%
1991	2,053	−4.9%
2001	2,081	+1.4%
2011	2,048	−1.6%
2021	2,051	+0.1%

Source: Censuses

== Transport ==
The I/50 road (part of the European route E50), which connects Brno with the Czech–Slovak border in Starý Hrozenkov via Uherské Hradiště, runs through the municipality.

== Sights ==
The main landmark of Bánov is the Church of Saint Martin. It was built in the early Baroque style in 1691–1699 and rebuilt to its present form in 1786–1787. The church is equipped with a valuable set of bells, one of which dates from 1498.
