= Sándor Apponyi =

Hungarian diplomat (1844–1925)

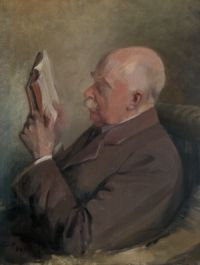
Sándor Apponyi

Count Sándor Apponyi de Nagyappony (19 January 1844 – 18 April 1925) was a Hungarian diplomat, bibliophile, bibliographer and great book collector.

Born in Paris, where his father, Count Rudolf Apponyi, was a diplomat, Sándor also became a diplomat. After his father's death he moved to Hungary, and improved his collection. He married Alexandra Esterházy.

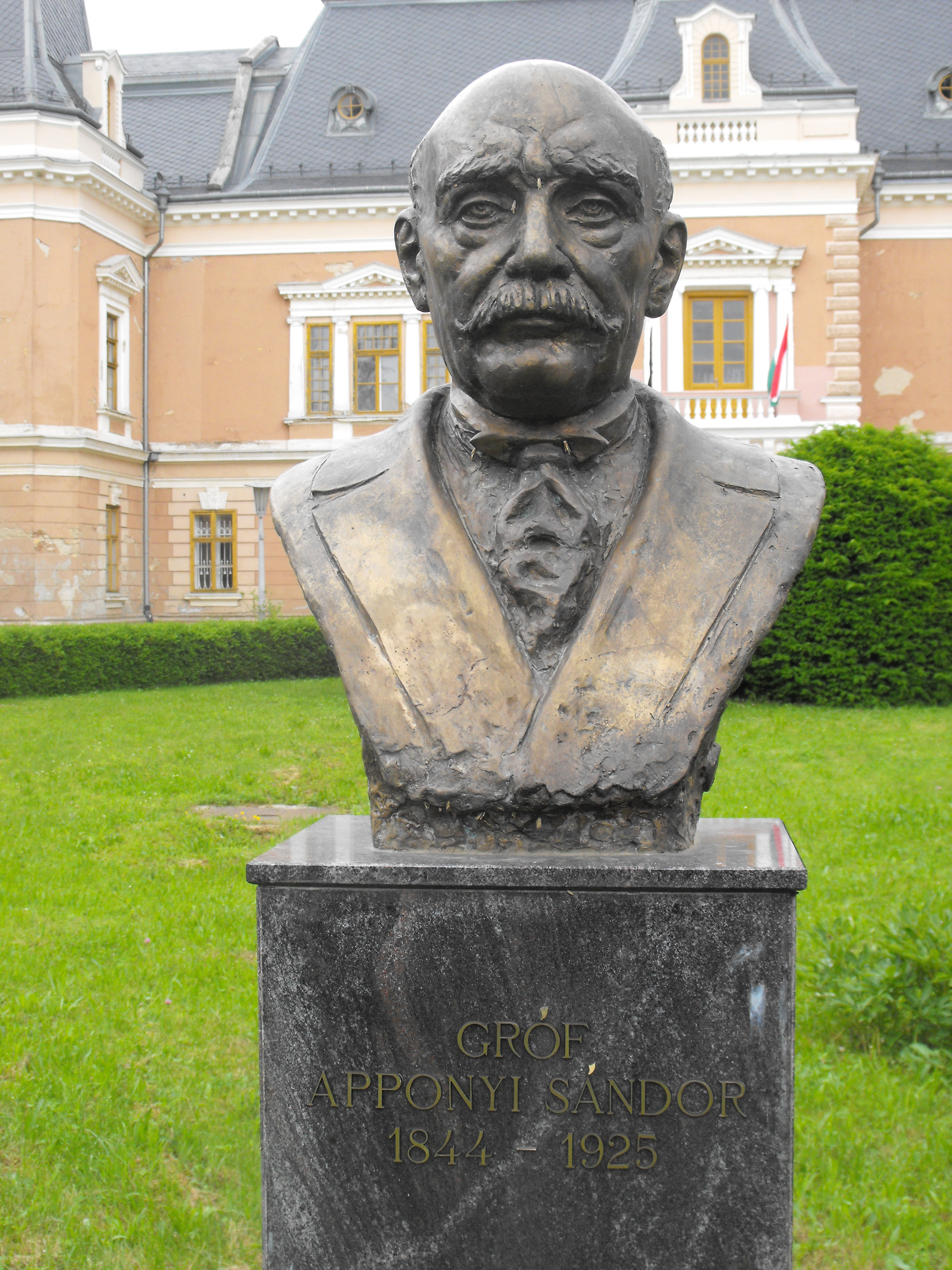
Bust of Count Sandor Apponyi (1844-1925) in front of Lengyel Castle, Hungary

While working as a Hungarian diplomat in London and Paris, he met many book lovers who inspired him to collect old printed books, especially works about Hungary by foreign writers. He purchased books from foreign and Hungarian antiquarians, and also acquired them at auction. Thus he was able to amass a collection of historical, arithmetical, biological, geographical and philosophical works in multiple languages, including German, French, Italian, Turkish, Dutch, English and Latin. His collection is now known as the Apponyi Hungarika, which is now held in the National Széchényi Library in Budapest, and contains about 3,000 books about a wide range of topics. For example, the collection includes a military history book about the Siege of Buda, and a book by Count Luigi Ferdinando Marsigli about coffee.

As he had family links through his ancestry with Isotta Nogarola, one of the most famous female humanists of the Italian Renaissance, Sándor Apponyi collected books about her era. This small collection of about 300 works is named Apponyi Rariora. In it can be found the same breadth of topics as in the Apponyi Hungarika, but it is focused on the Italian city of Verona.

He compiled a catalogue of his books in which he added comments to the bibliographical data.

A special law was adopted in 1926 by the Hungarian National Assembly to acknowledge the donation of the collection: it mentions several other comparable donations but adds that "Among all these generous, valuable donations, that of Count [Sándor] Apponyi is by far the most important."

Count Sándor Apponyi owned the Castle of Lengyel in Southern Transdanubia, which was later transformed into a school. A bust of him stands in front of the building.
