= Rudolf, Count of Apponyi =

Austro-Hungarian diplomat (1812–1876)

Count Rudolph von Apponyi
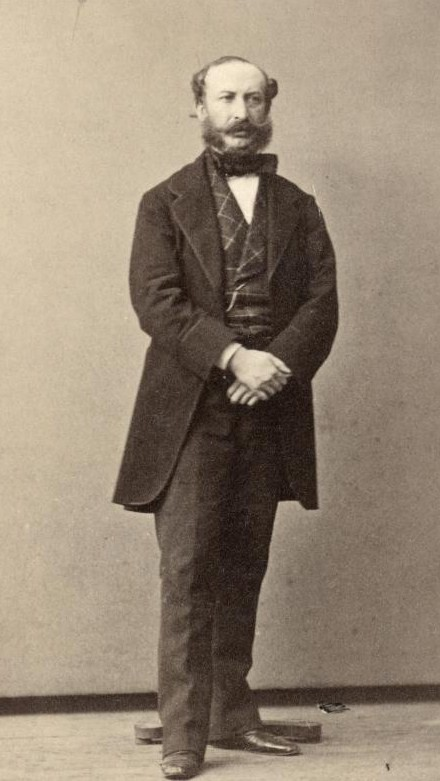
- Rudolf Apponyi de Nagy-Appony

Ambassador Extraordinary and Plenipotentiary to the United Kingdom
- In office 7 March 1856 – 8 November 1871
- Preceded by: Franz de Paula von Colloredo-Waldsee
- Succeeded by: Friedrich Ferdinand von Beust

Personal details
- Born: 1 August 1812 Karlsruhe, Baden
- Died: 31 May 1876 (aged 63) Venice, Kingdom of Italy
- Spouse: Anna von Benckendorff
- Children: 2

Count Rudolph von Apponyi (1 August 1812 – 31 May 1876) was an Austro-Hungarian diplomat and Ambassador to London.

== Biography ==
He was born in Karlsruhe, into the noble Apponyi family.

As his father, Rudolph entered the Austrian diplomatic service and held important positions in the course of his career.

He was Envoy to the Electorate of Hesse and the Grand Duchy of Baden (1847–1849), the Kingdom of Sardinia (1849–1853) and the Kingdom of Bavaria (1853–1856).

In 1856 he became Envoy to London, raised on 28 October 1860 to Ambassador to the court of St. James in London, until 8 November 1871. As such he participated in 1864 in the London Conference of 1864.

Afterwards he became Austro-Hungarian Ambassador to Paris (13 December 1871 – 30 April 1876). In 1875 he signed the Metre Convention in Paris for Austria-Hungary.

Count Apponyi was the bearer of the Grand Cross of the Austrian-Imperial Leopold Order and since 1865 of the Order of the Golden Fleece.

== Family ==
He married on 10 May 1840 in Saint Petersburg Anna Alexandrovna von Benckendorff (1818–1900), daughter of Russian general Count Alexander von Benckendorff. The couple had Two Children:

- Sándor Apponyi (Alexander Apponyi von Nagy-Appony) (19 January 1844 – 18 April 1925)
- Ilona Apponyi (15 November 1848 – 29 October 1914), married in 1866 to Paolo Borghese, 9th Prince of Sulmona.
