= Slovak literature =

Slovak literature is the literature of Slovakia.

== History ==
=== Middle Ages ===
The first monuments of literature from territory now included in present-day Slovakia are from the time of Great Moravia (from 863 to the early 10th century). Authors from this period are Saint Cyril, Saint Methodius and Clement of Ohrid. Works from this period, mostly written on Christian topics include: the poem Proglas as a foreword to the four Gospels, partial translations of the Bible into Old Church Slavonic, Zakon sudnyj ljudem, etc.

The medieval period covers the span from the 11th to the 15th century. Literature in this period was written in Latin, Czech and slovakized Czech. Lyric poetry (prayers, songs and formulas) was still under the influence of the Church, while epic poetry concentrated on legends. Authors from this period include Johannes de Thurocz, author of the Chronica Hungarorum, and Maurus. Secular literature also emerged and chronicles were written in this period.

=== 1500–1650 ===
Literature of a national character first emerged in the 16th century, much later than for other national literatures. Latin dominated as the written language in the 16th century. Besides Church topics, there was a development of antique topics, related to ancient Greece and Rome.

The first Slovak language book printed in territory of today's Slovakia is Bardejov Catechism of 1581.

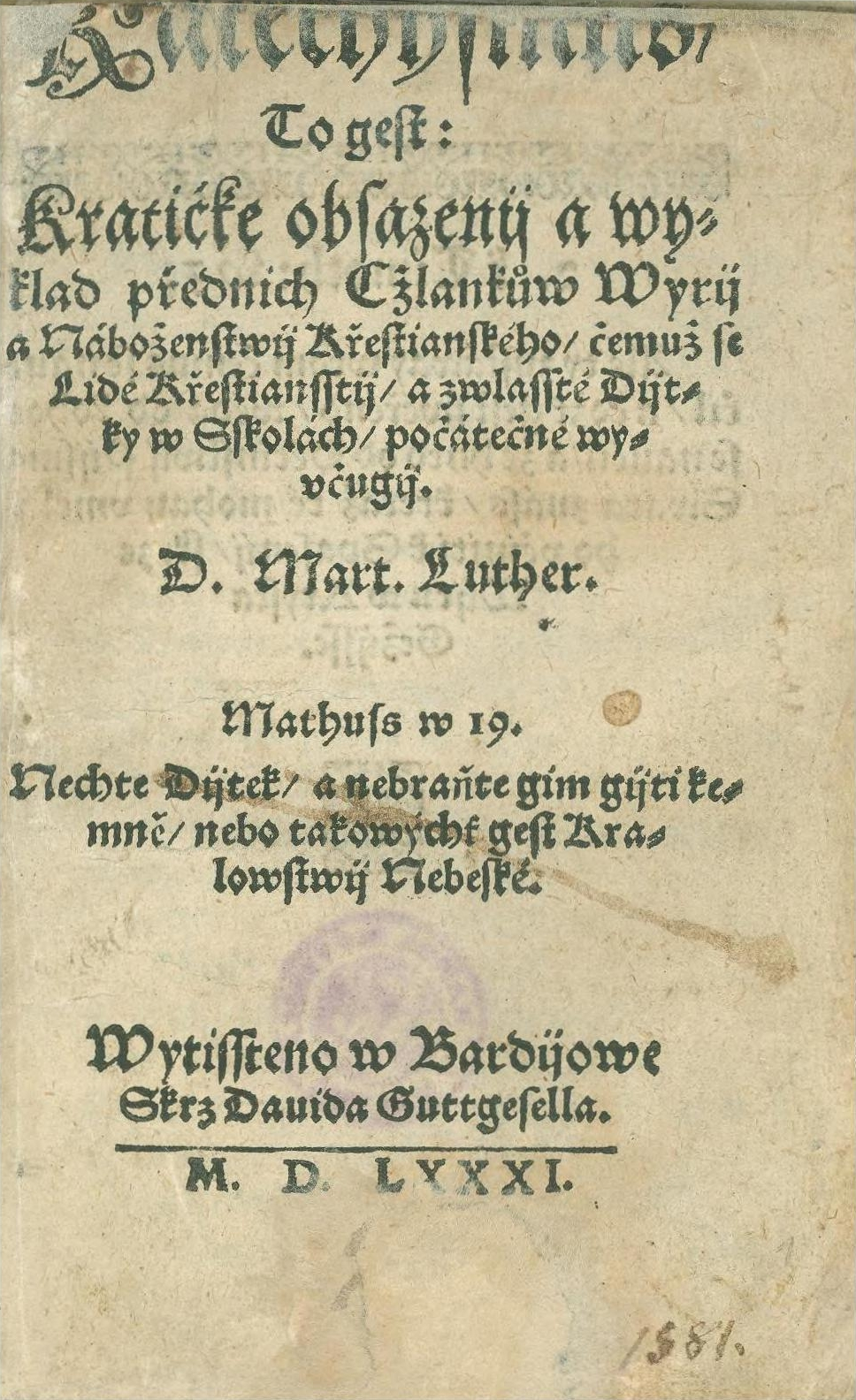
Bardejov Catechism

An early Slovak Renaissance love poem is the anonymous epic Siládi and Hadmázi (1560), set against a background of the Turkish incursions into Central Europe.

Juraj Tranovský was sometimes called the father of Slovak hymnody and issued several collections of hymns, the first being the Latin Odarum Sacrarum sive Hymnorum Libri III in 1629, but his most important and most famous word was Cithara Sanctorum (Lyre of the Saints), written in Czech, which appeared in 1636 in Levoča. This latter volume has formed the basis of Czech and Slovak Lutheran hymnody to the present day. Against the background of the scarcity of Slovak literature, Tranovský's Slovak hymns formed a source for raising national consciousness.

=== 1650–1780 ===
With the distinction between religious and secular literature that had started to develop in the Renaissance period, the religious conflicts in Slovakia during the Baroque period led to a clear division between sacred and profane.

Daniel Sinapius-Horčička wrote Latin poems and school dramas, religious prose, proverbs and select Slovak spiritual poetry. His prose displays national consciousness, lauding Slovak and criticizing the lack of patriotism among his fellow Slovaks.

Hugolín Gavlovič authored religious, moral, and educational writings in the contemporary West Slovak vernacular, and was a prominent representative of baroque literature in Slovakia. His most famous piece of work is Valašská škola, mravúv stodola, a work of 17,862 verses, as well as numerous versified couplet-marginalia.

=== 1780–1840 ===
Slovak Classicism was part of the larger European neo-Classicist movement of the Enlightenment. The rise of nationalism in the aftermath of the French Revolution gave rise to a national revival in literature. Until the mid-nineteenth century, Slovak was generally written in the form of Czech, with various degrees of Slovakization. Anton Bernolák's Gramatica Slavika used a West Slovak dialect as the standard written form, a transitional step to modern literary Slovak, but ultimately a failure. Even so, significant works were published using Bernolák's standards, beginning with Juraj Fándly's 1879 Dúverná zmlúva medzi mňíchom a ďáblom (An intimate conversation between the monk and the Devil). Lutheran Slovaks like Augustin Dolezal, Juraj Palkovič and Pavel Jozef Šafárik tended to prefer a common Czech-Slovak identity and language.

The first Hungarian newspaper Magyar Hirmondó was published in Pressburg (Bratislava) in 1780, followed in 1783 by the first Slovak newspaper, a short-lived periodical, Prešpurské Noviny in 1783.

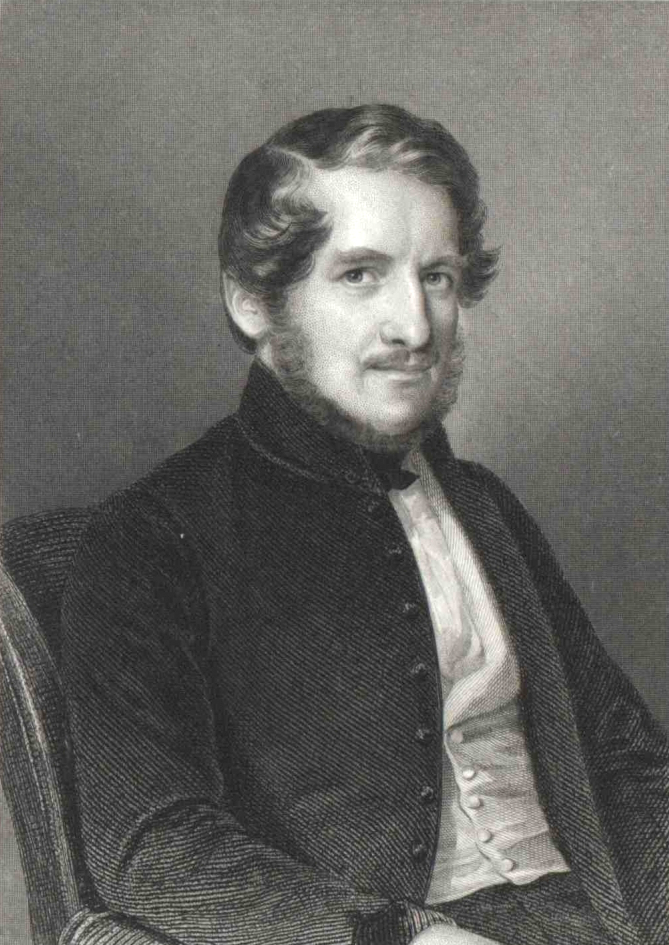
Painting of Bajza József Barabás

Jozef Ignác Bajza is best known for his novel René mláďenca príhodi a skúsenosťi (original, modern spelling René mládenca príhody a skúsenosti – 1784), which was the first novel written in Slovak.

Pan-Slavic unity served as the template for many poems of this period. Ján Kollár's collection of 150 poems, Slávy Dcera, glorifies pan-Slavic ideals in three cantos named after the Saale, Elbe and Danube. Jan Holly's epic poem Svätopluk, published in 1833, serves as the most significant text of the period.

=== 1840–1871 ===
Ľudovít Štúr was the leader of the Slovak national revival in the 19th century, the creator of standard Slovak, eventually leading to the modern standard Slovak. The central Slovak dialect was chosen as the basis of the standard language. Štúr's codification work was disapproved by Ján Kollár and the Czechs, who saw it as an act of Slovak withdrawal from the idea of a common Czecho-Slovak nation and a weakening of solidarity. But the majority of Slovak scholars, including the Catholics (using Bernolák's codification until then), welcomed the notion of codification. In 1844, he wrote Nárečja slovenskuo alebo potreba písaňja v tomto nárečí ("The Slovak dialect or the necessity to write in this dialect"). In 1853 the only compilation of his poetry, Spevy a piesne ("Singings and songs") was published in Pressburg.

Janko Kráľ was one of the first poets to start writing in modern Slovak standard freshly codified (in 1843) by Ľudovít Štúr and his companions.

Dramatist Ján Chalupka's first works were in Czech, but after 1848 he started writing in Slovak and translated Czech originals into Slovak.

=== 1872–1917 ===
Pavol Országh Hviezdoslav wrote his youthful poems only in Hungarian until the 1860s. In 1871 he participated in the preparation of the Almanach Napred ("Forward") which marks the beginning of a new literary generation in Slovak literature. He introduced the syllabic-tonic verse into Slovak poetry and became leading representative of Slovak literary realism. His style is characterized by extensive use of self-coined words and expressions making it difficult to translate his works into foreign languages.

Martin Kukučín was the most notable representative of Slovak literary realism, and is considered to be one of the founders of modern Slovak prose.

=== 1918–1945 ===
As a result of the breakup of the Austro-Hungarian Empire and subsequent establishment of Czechoslovakia, the sociolinguistic pressures of Magyarization disappeared. During the interwar period, the preeminence of poetry gave way to prose. Milo Urban's 1927 work Živý bič (The Living Whip) and Jozef Cíger-Hronský's 1933 novel Jozef Mak both focused on the village, and the nature of change.

During the turbulent years of the Slovak Republic and reestablishment of Czechoslovakia, two separate literary movements dominated, the lyrical prose of Hronský, František Švantner, Dobroslav Chrobák, Ľudo Ondrejov and Margita Figuli ( Three Chestnut Horses), and the Slovak surrealists (Štefan Žáry, Rudolf Fabry, Pavel Bunčák and others).

== See also ==
- History of Slovak
- List of libraries in Slovakia
- Slovak poetry
- Slovak prose
