= František Švantner =

Slovak writer (1912–1950)

František Švantner (January 29, 1912 in Bystrá, present day Slovakia – October 13, 1950 in Prague, present-day Czech Republic) was a naturalist Slovak prose writer.

== Biography ==
He was born in Bystrá in a family of a manual worker. He studied in his birthplace, later in Podbrezová and Banská Bystrica. After finishing his studies, he worked as a teacher in different places (Mýto pod Ďumbierom, Podbrezová, Nová Baňa, Hronský Beňadik), until he became a principal of school in Hronov for a short time. He also worked for a local organization of Matica slovenská and became a member of Umelecká beseda slovenská. He died of a brain tumor in Prague.

== Works ==
=== Writing career ===
He started writing during his studies in Banská Bystrica, where he published his short story in the periodical Svojeť. Švantner gained inspiration from archaic myths and ballads. He was influenced by writers such as Edgar Allan Poe, Émile Zola, Victor Hugo, Charles Ferdinand Ramuz, Fyodor Dostoyevsky, and from Slovak authors, mainly Margita Figuli, Ľudo Ondrejov and Dobroslav Chrobák. Švantner's prose celebrates nature; he was a naturalistic writer. He used elements of irrationality and fantasy, but he mainly explored the boundaries between life and death.

=== List of works ===
- 1933: Výpoveď (published in Svojeť)
- 1944: Málka - novella
- 1946: Nevesta hôľ - novel
- 1956: Život bez konca - novel (published after his death)
- 1966: Dáma - collection of novellas
