= Bardejov Catechism =

Bardejov Catechism (Slovak: Bardejovský katechizmus) is the translation of Luther's Small Catechism into the Slovak (Slovakized Czech) language. The book published by David Gutgesel in 1581 in Bardejov is the first known printed Slovak book. Its original title is Katechysmus, To gest: Kratičke obsazenij a wyklad přednich Cžlankůw Wyrij a Náboženstwij Křestianského čemuž se Lidé Křestiansstij a zwlasste Dijtky w Sskolách počátečné wyvčugij. D. Mart. Luther (Catechism, that is: A Brief Overview and an Exposition of the Foremost Articles of Faith and the Christian Religion, Which Catechumens, and Especially Children in Schools, Learn Initially. D. Martin Luther).

The catechism was probably translated by a single translator, a native Slovak speaker, who preserved Slovak in all language layers (phonetic, grammar, lexemes). The translation testifies to the awareness of Slovak Protestants about the Reformation in the German lands and the development of their belief. The book is preserved in a single copy stored in the Slovak National Library in Martin.

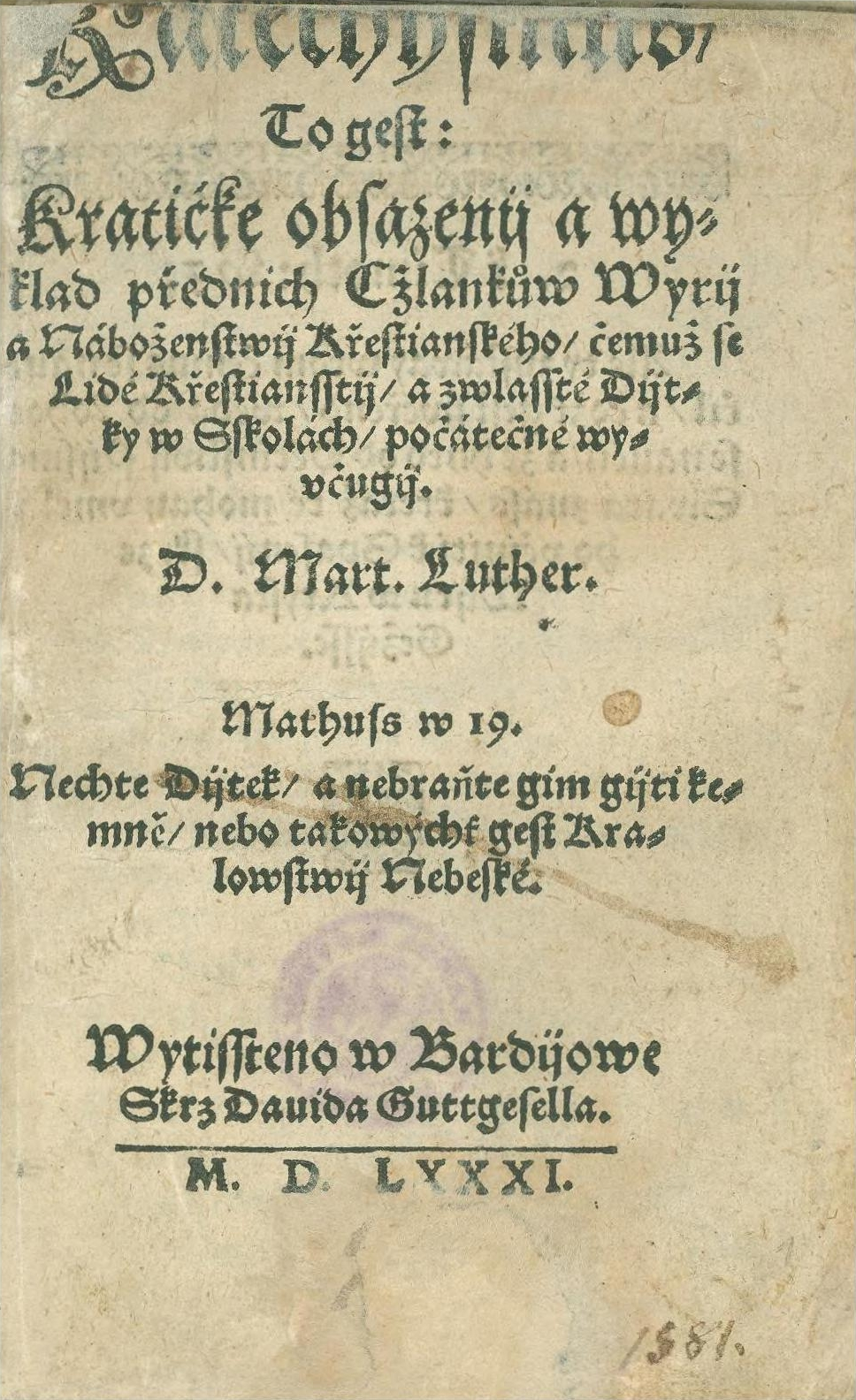
A Brief Overview and an Exposition of the Foremost Articles of Faith and the Christian Religion, Which Catechumens, and Especially Children in Schools, Learn Initially. D. Martin Luther
