= Bystrá, Brezno District =

Bystrá Sebesér
- Municipality
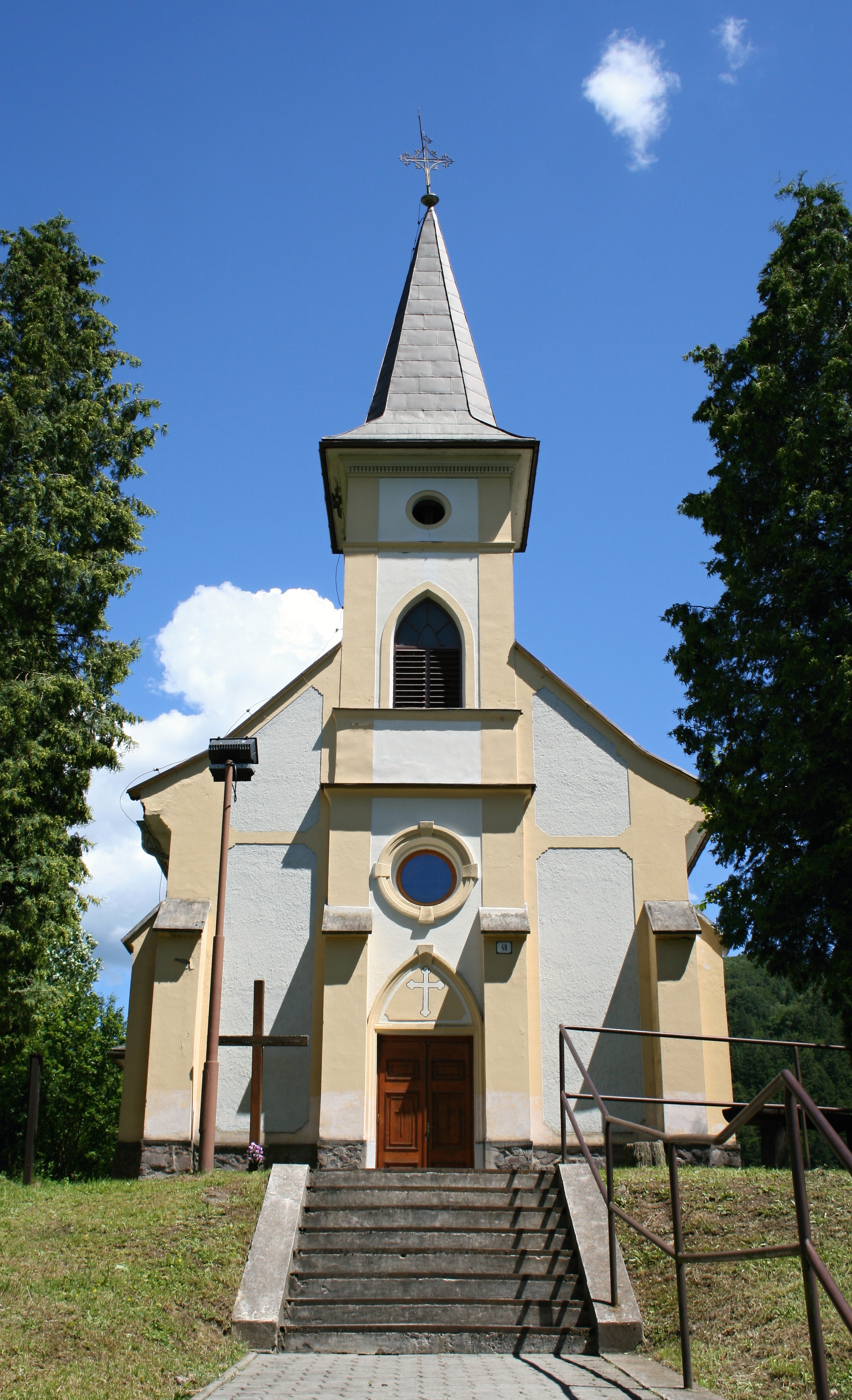

- Flag

- Location of Bystrá in the Banská Bystrica Region Location of Bystrá in Slovakia
- Coordinates: 48°50′N 19°36′E
- Country: Slovakia
- Region: Banská Bystrica Region
- District: Brezno District
- First mentioned: 1563

Government
  - Mayor: Marian Alberta

Area
  - Total: 15.88 km^{2} (6.13 sq mi)
- Elevation: 566 m (1,857 ft)

Population (2025)
  - Total: 156
- Time zone: UTC+1 (CET)
  - Summer (DST): UTC+2 (CEST)
- Postal code: 977 01
- Area code: +421 48
- Vehicle registration plate (until 2022): BR
- Website: www.bystra.sk

Bystrá (Hungarian: Sebesér) is a village and municipality in Brezno District, in the Banská Bystrica Region of central Slovakia.

== Population ==
Population statistic (10 years)
Year	1995	2005	2015	2025
Count	229	200	192	156
Difference		−12.66%	−4%	−18.75%

Population statistic
Year	2024	2025
Count	152	156
Difference		+2.63%

It has a population of 156 people (31 December 2025).

=== Ethnicity ===
Census 2021 (1+ %)
Ethnicity	Number	Fraction
Slovak	158	96.34%
Not found out	5	3.04%
Other	3	1.82%
Czech	2	1.21%
Total	164	

In year 2021 was 164 people by ethnicity 158 as Slovak, 5 as Not found out, 3 as Other, 2 as Czech, 1 as Rusyn and 1 as Croatian.

Note on population: The difference values of population numbers in the table "Population statistic" and in the sections "Ethnicity" & "Religion" is caused by the use of various statistical methods.

=== Religion ===
Census 2021 (1+ %)
Religion	Number	Fraction
Roman Catholic Church	94	57.32%
None	51	31.1%
Evangelical Church	10	6.1%
Not found out	6	3.66%
Other	2	1.22%
Total	164	

In year 2021 was 164 people by religion 94 from Roman Catholic Church, 51 from None, 10 from Evangelical Church, 6 from Not found out, 2 from Other and 1 from Greek Catholic Church.

== Attractions ==
The gothic Roman Catholic church of St, Florian is located in the center of the village.

During winter Bystra is mainly popular for ice-skating and winter walks. Until the 2010s Bystra also had its own ski slope. During winter the competition for the tastiest sausage is held in Bystra.

During summer the main touristic attractions are hiking and visits to the caves. There are two caves in Bystra:

- Bystrianska cave
- Cave of dead bats

== Notable personalities ==
- František Švantner, writer

== Genealogical resources ==
The records for genealogical research are available at the state archive "Statny Archiv in Banska Bystrica, Slovakia"

- Roman Catholic church records (births/marriages/deaths): 1788-1923 (parish B)

== See also ==
- List of municipalities and towns in Slovakia
