= Oponice =

Oponice Appony
- Municipality
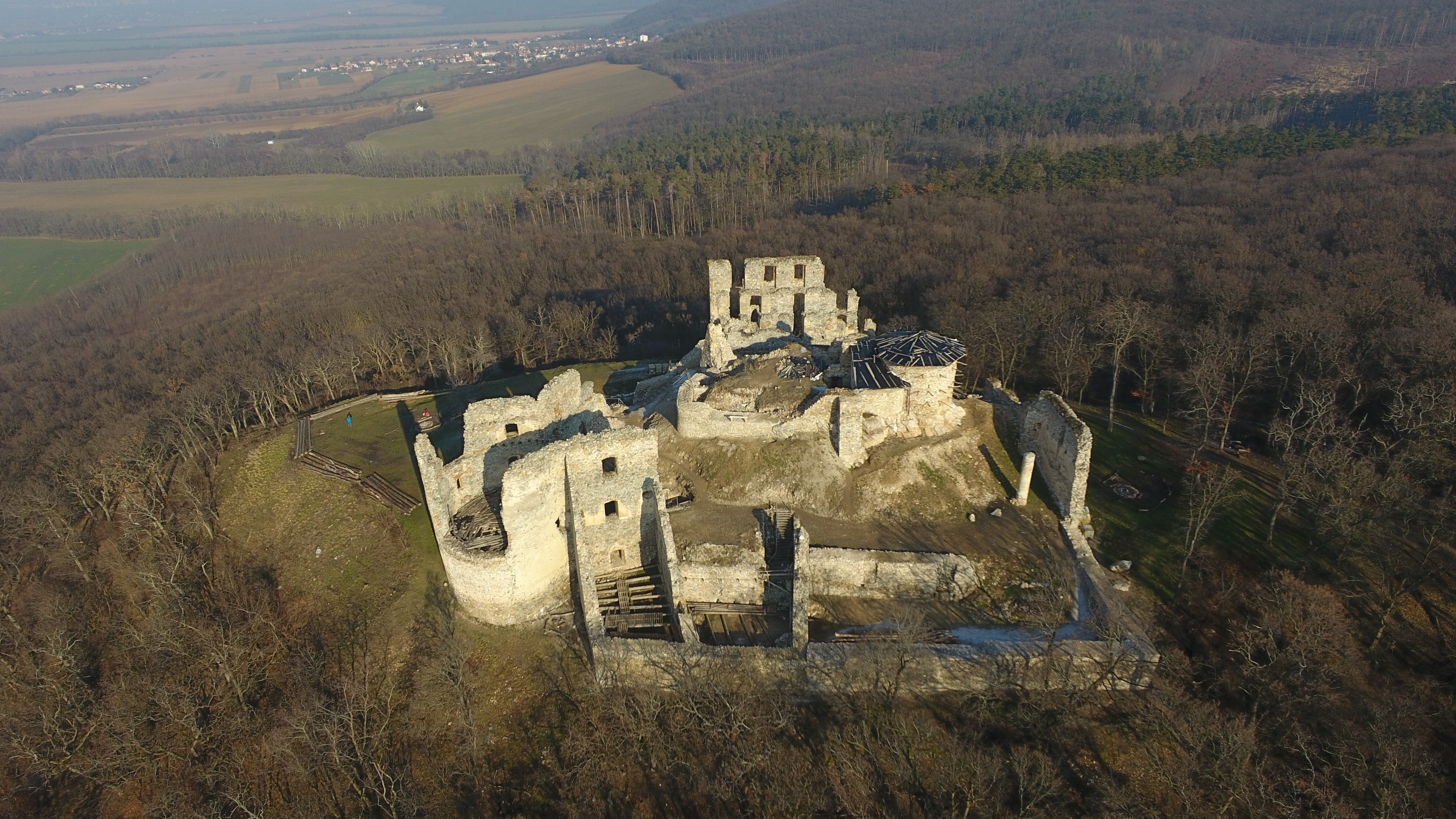
- Ruins of the Apponyi fortress

- Flag

- Location of Oponice in the Nitra Region Location of Oponice in Slovakia
- Coordinates: 48.47°N 18.15°E
- Country: Slovakia
- Region: Nitra Region
- District: Topoľčany District
- First mentioned: 1218

Government
  - Mayor: Milan Gál

Area
  - Total: 12.29 km^{2} (4.75 sq mi)
- Elevation: 169 m (554 ft)

Population (2025)
  - Total: 822
- Time zone: UTC+1 (CET)
  - Summer (DST): UTC+2 (CEST)
- Postal code: 956 14
- Area code: +421 38
- Vehicle registration plate (until 2022): TO
- Website: oponice.sk

Oponice (Hungarian: Appony) is a municipality and village in the Topoľčany District of the Nitra Region, Slovakia. In 2011 it had 879 inhabitants. It is bordered by the Nitra River to the west and the Tribeč range of the Fatra-Tatra mountain complex to the east. Part of the municipality is within the Ponitrie Protected Landscape Area.

Until around 1910, there was a longstanding division between the southern side of the village, known as Greater Appony (Nagyappony in Hungarian, Veľké Oponice in Slovak) and traditionally held by the Apponyis, and the northern side or Lesser Appony (Kisappony, Malé Oponice), where other families have long been dominant. The Church of St Peter and St Paul marked the boundary between the two sections.

== Geography ==
The municipality lies at an altitude of 169 metres (554 ft) and covers an area of 12.29 km^{2} (4.75 sq mi) (2025).

== Etymology ==
The name is derived from Slovak opona, oponica – "a cover", "a tent", in modern Slovak "a curtain" (Apon 1218, Opon 1315 – Veľké Oponice, Oponh 1300 – Malé Oponice). The name was probably motivated by a guard camp belonging to the neighbouring castle. It was Apponitz in German and Appony in Hungarian, thus the name of the Apponyi family which retains that spelling even when referred to in Slovak.

== History ==
The village's history was dominated by disputes between the Apponyi family and the Chapter of Nitra Cathedral in the 15th century, by the widespread adoption of Lutheranism in the 16th century (reversed in the 17th), and then by Ottoman raids especially in 1530-1531 and in the late 16th century. In 1663–1685, a period of Ottoman rule between the fourth Austro-Turkish war and the War of the Holy League, it was part of the Uyvar Province as an administrative unit of the Nahiye of Nitra. The parish was merged with nearby Kovarce in the early 18th century, and made independent again in 1788. Census data from the 19th century documents that the overwhelming majority of the village's population were Slovaks, the rest being mostly Germans and Hungarians.

In 2015, a memorial plaque was dedicated in Oponice in honor of Queen Geraldine of Albania, who grew up in Oponice and retained fond memories of her time there.

== Population ==
Population statistic (10 years)
Year	1995	2005	2015	2025
Count	815	915	809	822
Difference		+12.26%	−11.58%	+1.60%

Population statistic
Year	2024	2025
Count	834	822
Difference		−1.43%

It has a population of 822 people (31 December 2025).

=== Ethnicity ===
Census 2021 (1+ %)
Ethnicity	Number	Fraction
Slovak	764	93.17%
Not found out	49	5.97%
Total	820	

In year 2021 was 820 people by ethnicity 764 as Slovak, 49 as Not found out, 7 as Romanian, 5 as Czech, 3 as Russian and 3 as Hungarian.

Note on population: The difference values of population numbers in the table "Population statistic" and in the sections "Ethnicity" & "Religion" is caused by the use of various statistical methods.

=== Religion ===
Census 2021 (1+ %)
Religion	Number	Fraction
Roman Catholic Church	620	75.61%
None	128	15.61%
Not found out	50	6.1%
Evangelical Church	9	1.1%
Total	820	

In year 2021 was 820 people by religion 620 from Roman Catholic Church, 128 from None, 50 from Not found out, 9 from Evangelical Church, 6 from Christian Congregations in Slovakia, 5 from Greek Catholic Church and 2 from Ad hoc movements.

== Apponyi fortress ==
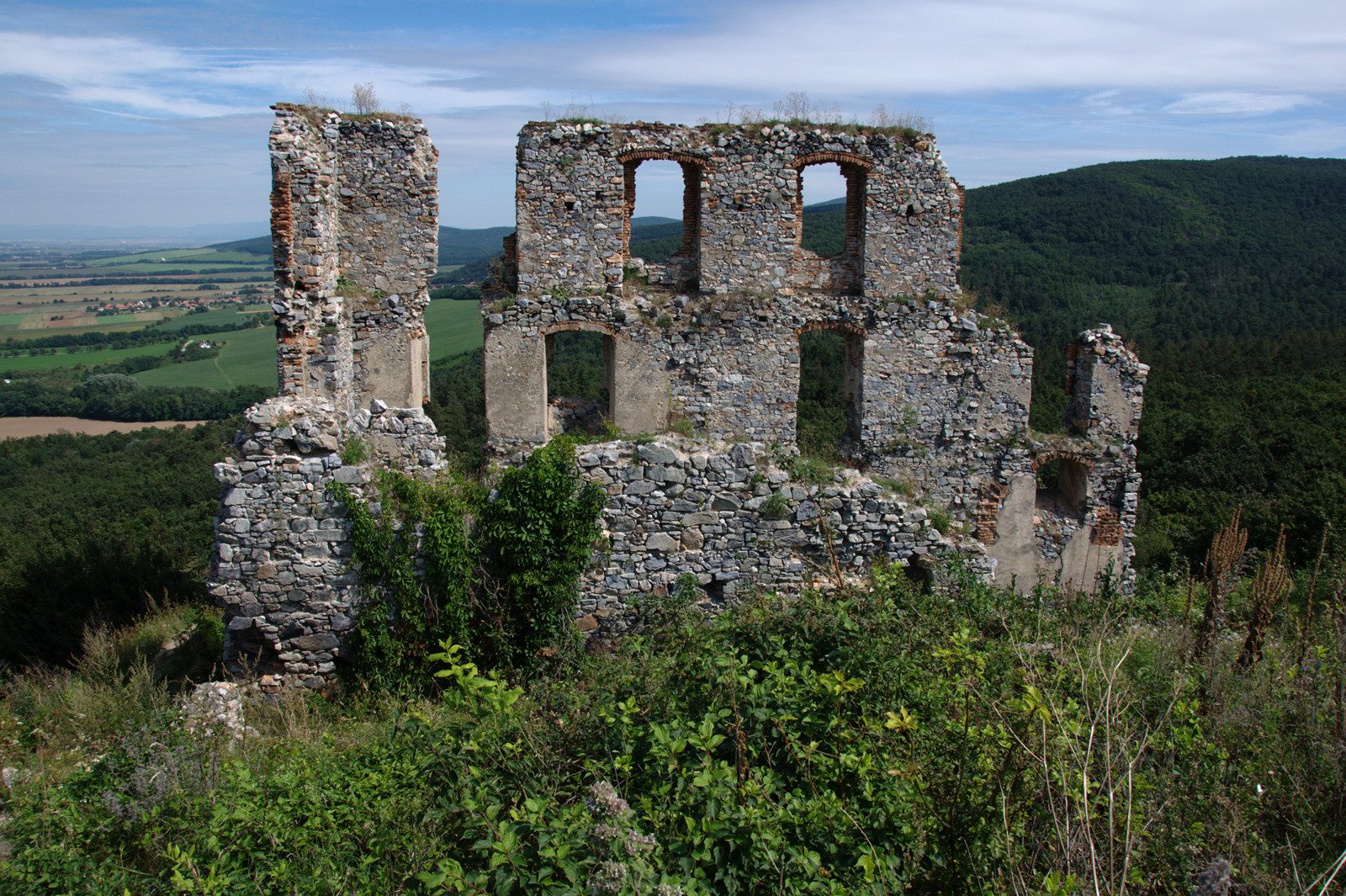
Apponyi fortress

The Apponyi fortress is an ancient hillside castle that may have been first built under the Great Moravian Empire and took a high medieval shape in the 13th century. It once belonged to Matthew III Csák, and subsequently to the King's demesne for most of the 14th century. It was granted to the family in 1392 by Sigismund of Luxemburg, following which they took up the Apponyi name. The Apponyis made major alterations and extensions in the 15th, 16th and 17th centuries. It fell into ruin in the 17th century following fire in 1645. Count Lazar Apponyi moved to the more comfortable Apponyi Castle downhill in the village, which he had started to build. The fortress was last used as a stronghold during Rákóczi's War of Independence; following the Habsburg victory near Trenčín in August 1708 it was destroyed like many nobility strongholds in the region, and permanently abandoned. It was first excavated in 1981 and further in 2002, 2008, and 2015–2016.

A thesis in archaeology held in 2019 at Masaryk University in Brno provides an extensive analysis of the Apponyi fortress as well as the Apponyi Castle and the nearby ruined castle of Čeklís near Bernolákovo.

== Apponyi Castle ==
Apponyi Castle was built up by the Apponyi family in various phases from the 16th to the early 20th centuries. A major addition was the construction in the mid-19th century of a dedicated new wing to host the Apponyi Library following its transfer from Bratislava. The castle was inhabited by a number of members of the family, including Count Lajos Apponyi (1849-1909) and his two sons, Gyula (1873-1924) and Henrik (1885-1935), the last occupant from the family. Geraldine Apponyi, daughter of Count Gyula also spent part of her childhood there and kept fond memories of it. The castle hosted illustrious visitors, including Theodore Roosevelt in 1910, Josephine Baker, and the Maharaja of Patiala in 1930. It was sold in the late 1930s to the Slezák family and was taken over under Czechoslovakia's Communist regime by an agricultural cooperative, which caused considerable degradation to both the building and the Library. It was acquired by a school in 1970 but renovation projects did not come to fruition. In 2007 it was privatized by the Slovak Ministry of Agriculture. The new owners subsequently restored the property between 2007 and 2011, and rebuilt the Apponyi Library. Apponyi Castle is now a luxury hotel, branded Chateau Appony.

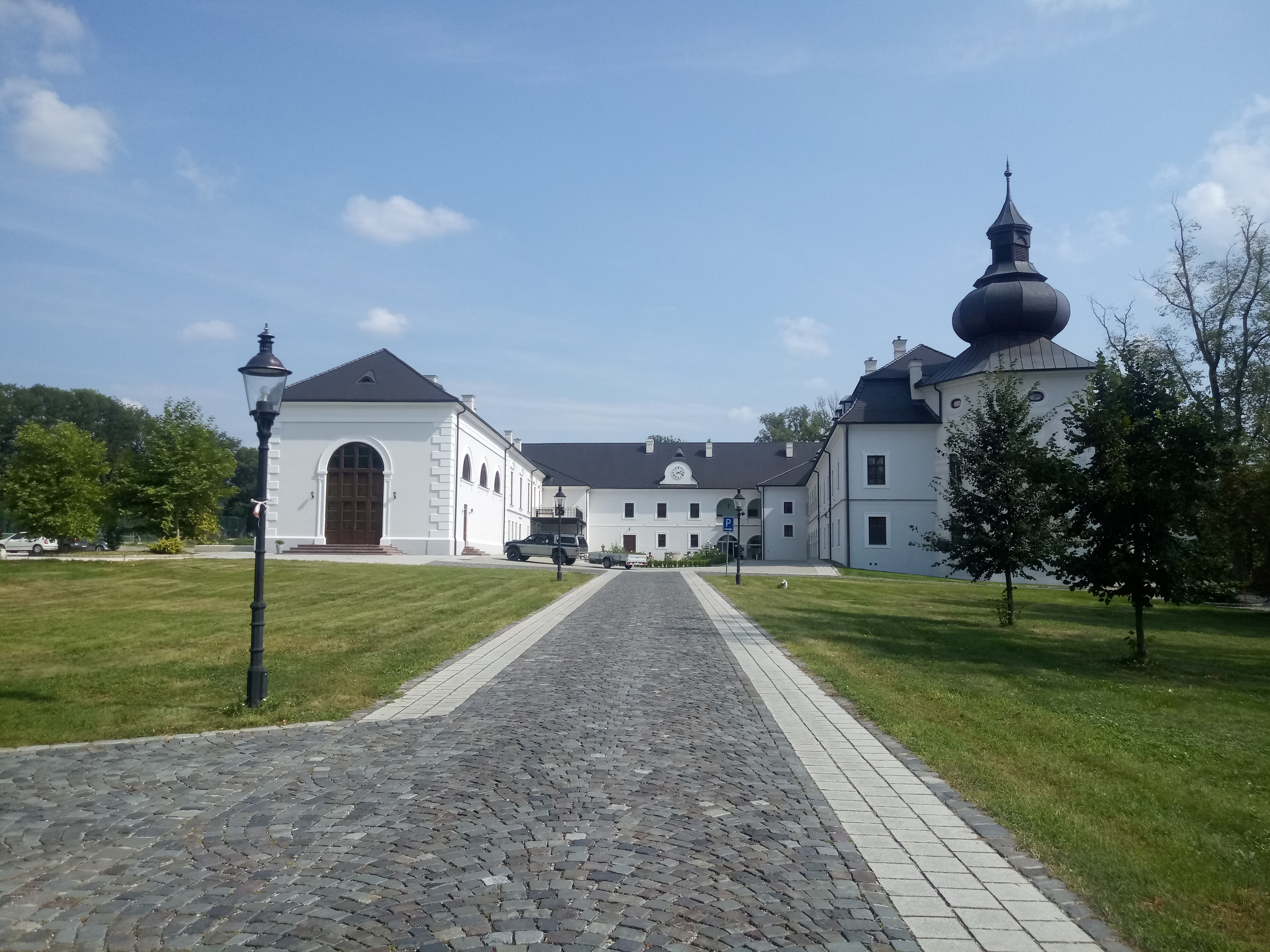
Apponyi Castle in 2019

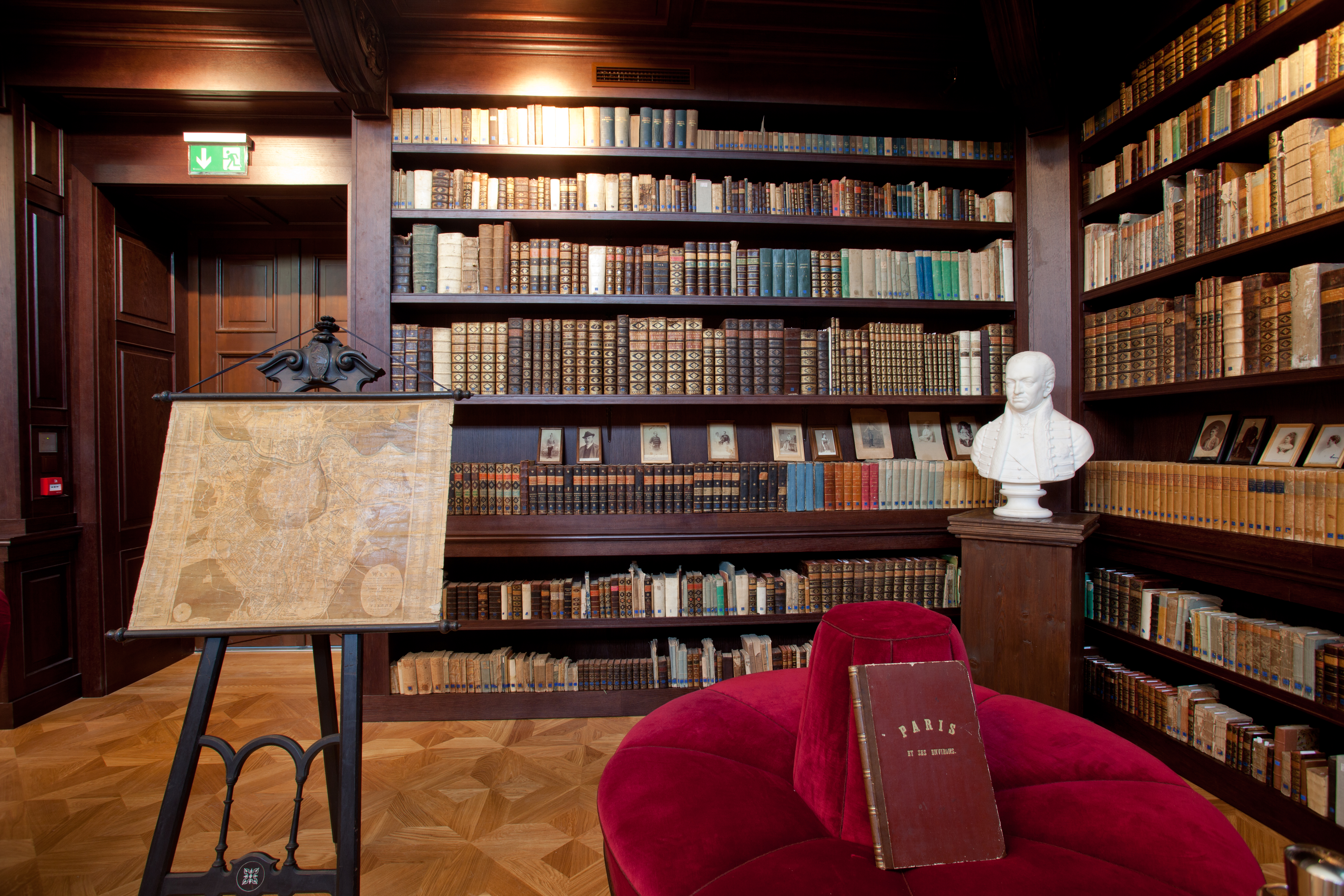
Apponyi Library after restoration

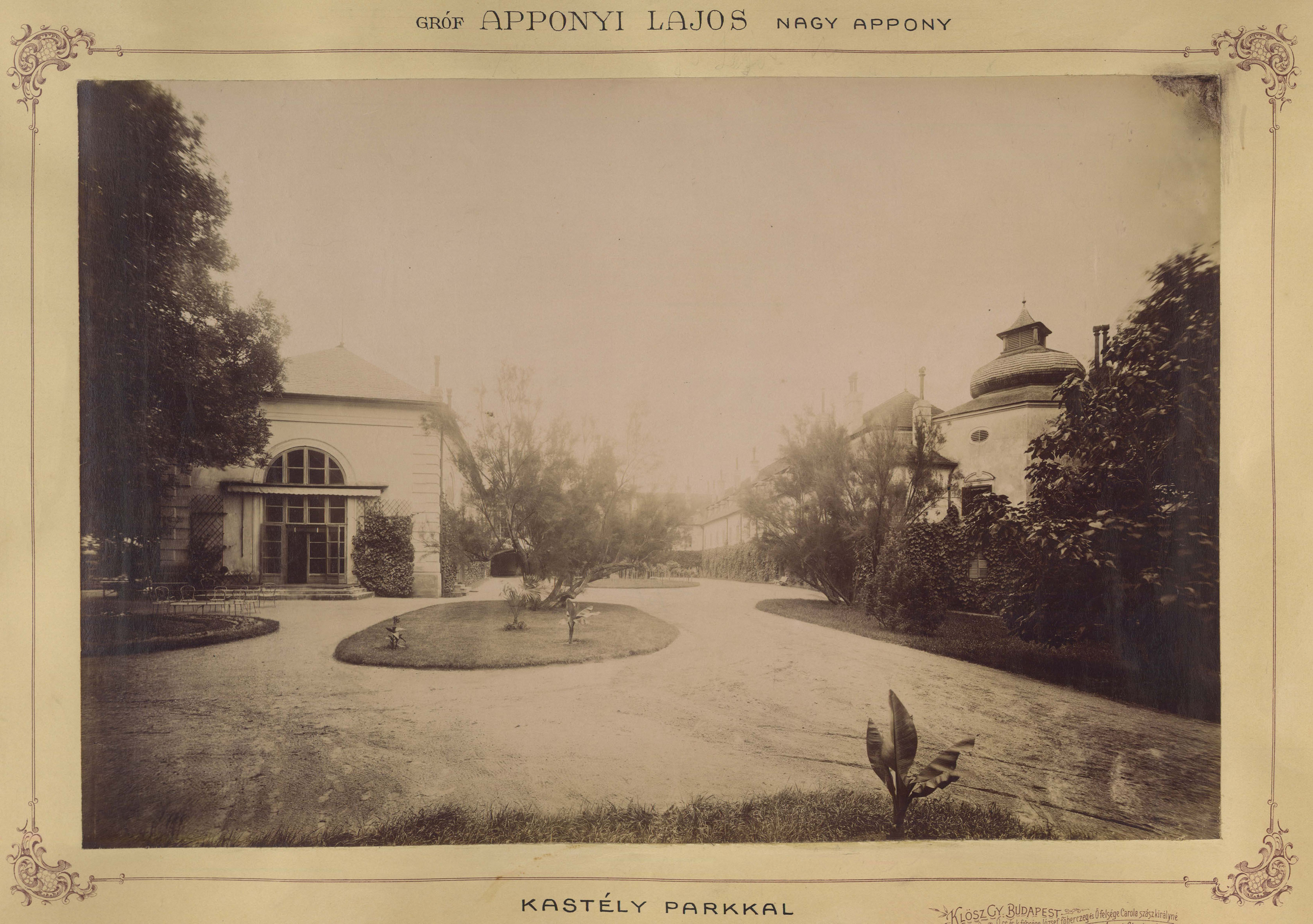
1900 postcard: front view

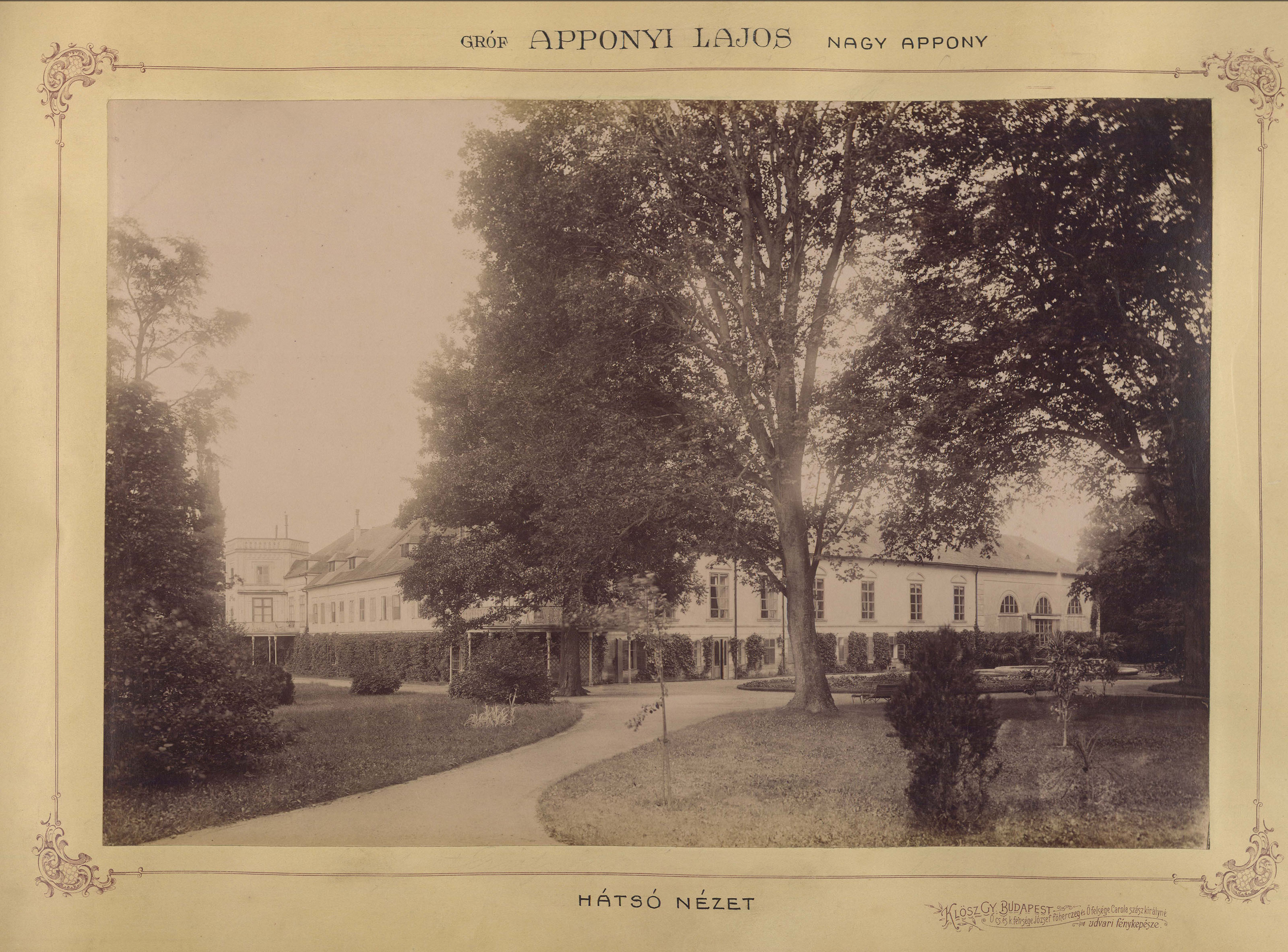
1900 postcard: garden view

== Apponyi Museum ==
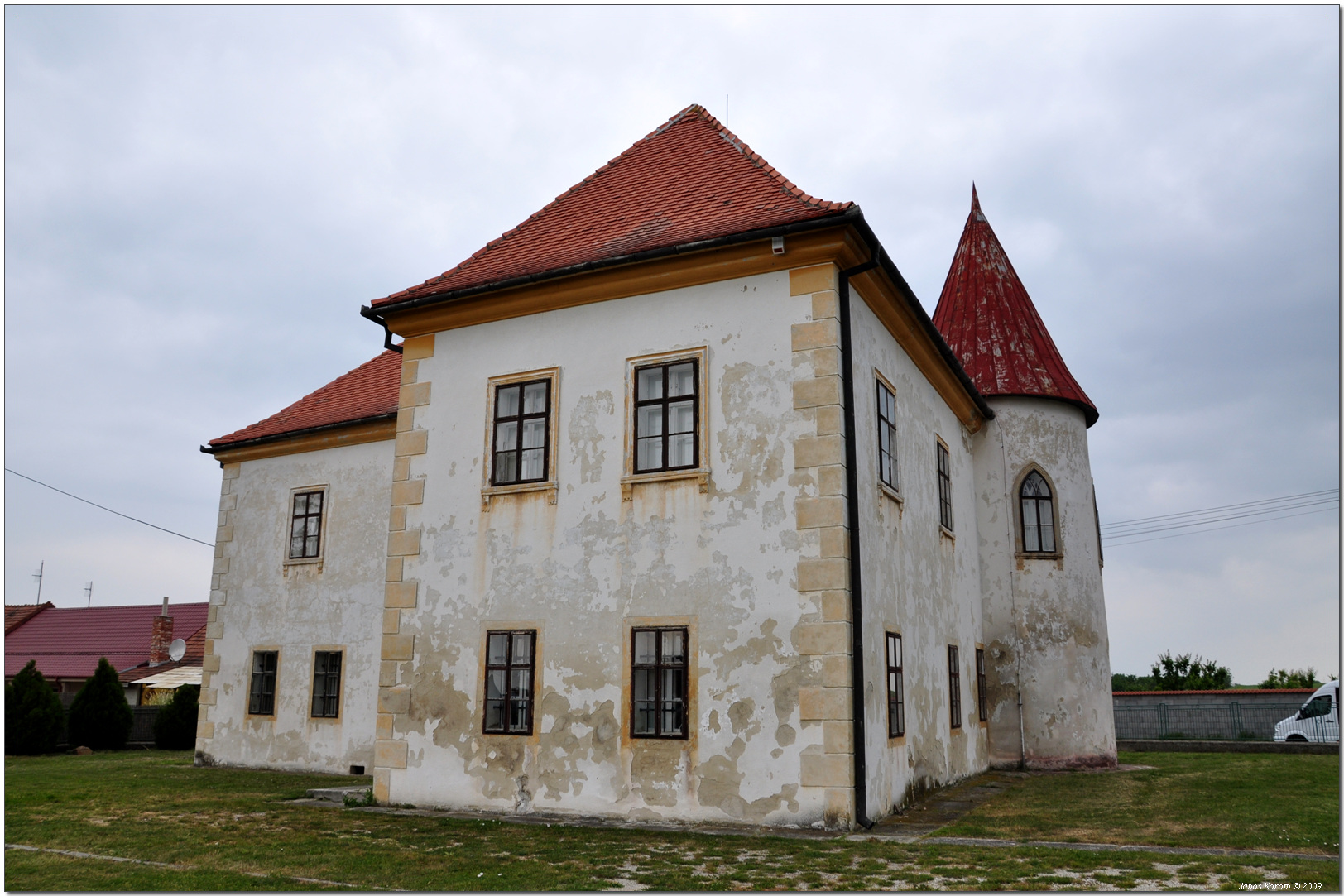
Apponyi Museum

The Apponyi Museum is in an old manor which was built in the late 16th or early 17th century. It was later bought by the Apponyis. In the Interwar period, Count Henrik Apponyi donated it to the Oponice municipality, in exchange for an exemption from municipal tax. Henrik Apponyi spent much of his time and money on traveling and hunting in exotic locales, and also donated many of his hunting trophies to the museum (whose exact name is Museum of Apponyi and Hunting - Apponyiho Poľovnícke Múzeum). The museum, which was created in 1993, has collections on the village's history and Apponyi family history, as well as remains from a plane that crashed in the nearby hills during World War II.

== Church of Saint Peter and Saint Paul ==
The village church, dedicated to Saint Peter and Saint Paul, was built in the late 18th century, replacing an earlier building possibly as old as the 12th century. It has an 1869 organ donated by Countess Szofia Apponyi.

On the southern side is a low building that leads to the crypt of the Apponyi family, where burials were made from the late 18th century to the death of the last resident family member, Count Henrik Apponyi, in 1935. Before 1790, Apponyi family members were buried in nearby monasteries such as Zobor Abbey, but these were dissolved under Joseph II and remains were transferred to the Oponice church crypt. In 1846, following the closure of the Apponyi Public Library in Bratislava, the monumental coat of arms that had decorated the Library building was transferred and placed above the exterior entrance of that building. In 1910 following the previous year's death of Count Lajos Apponyi, his widow Margarethe had a large memorial plaque added on the side.

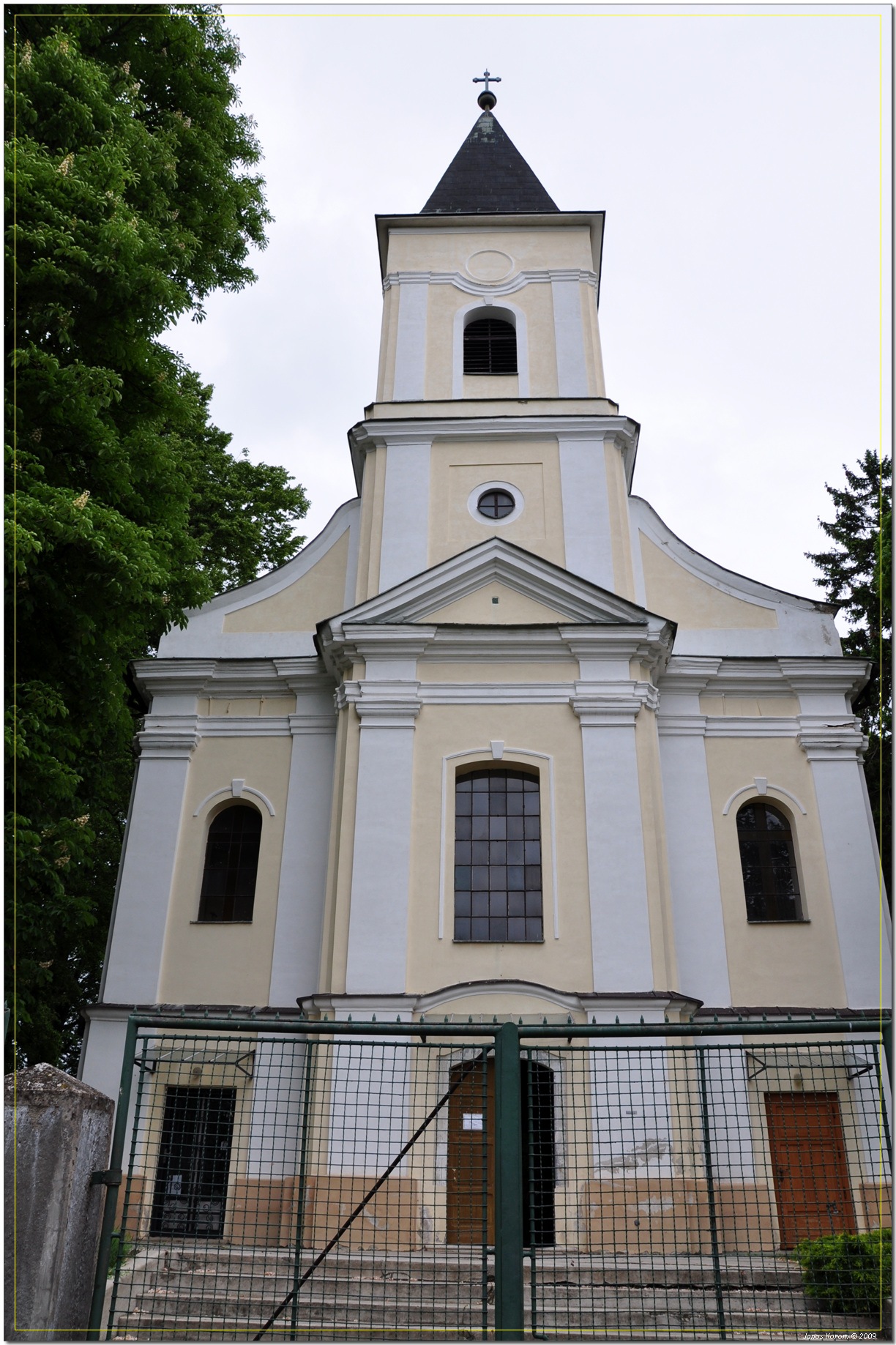
Exterior

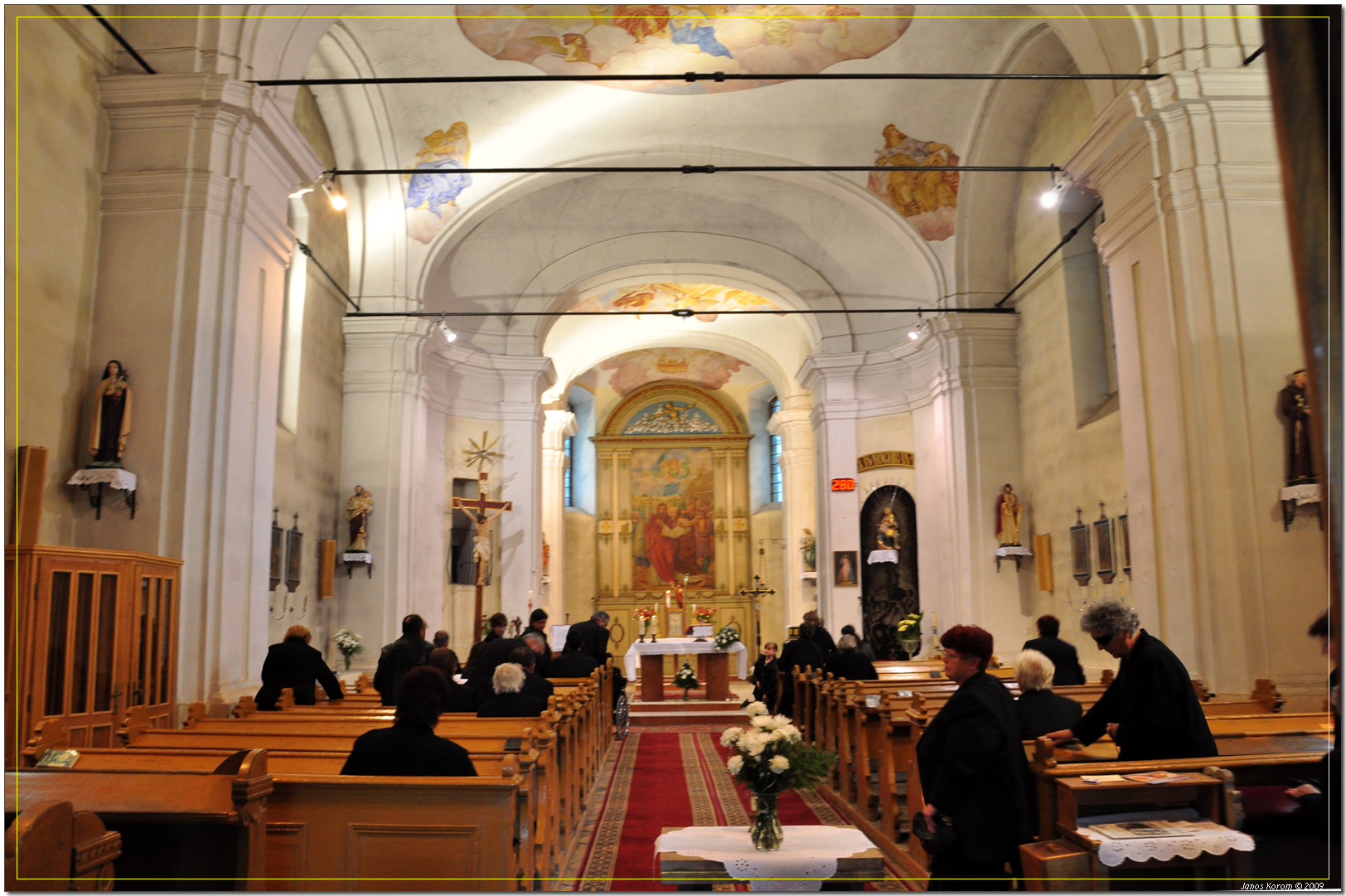
Interior

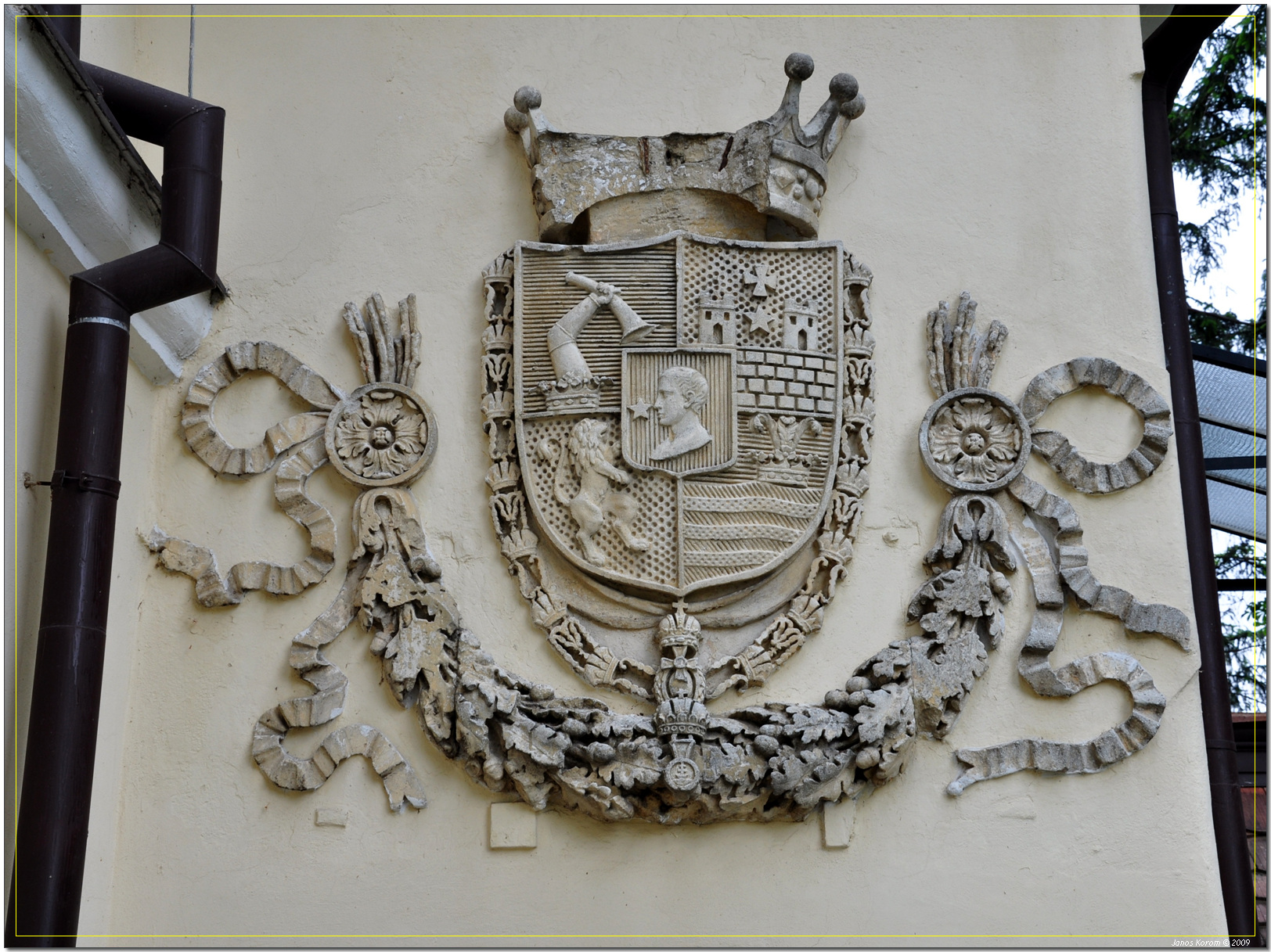
Monumental Apponyi coat of arms (before restoration in 2018)

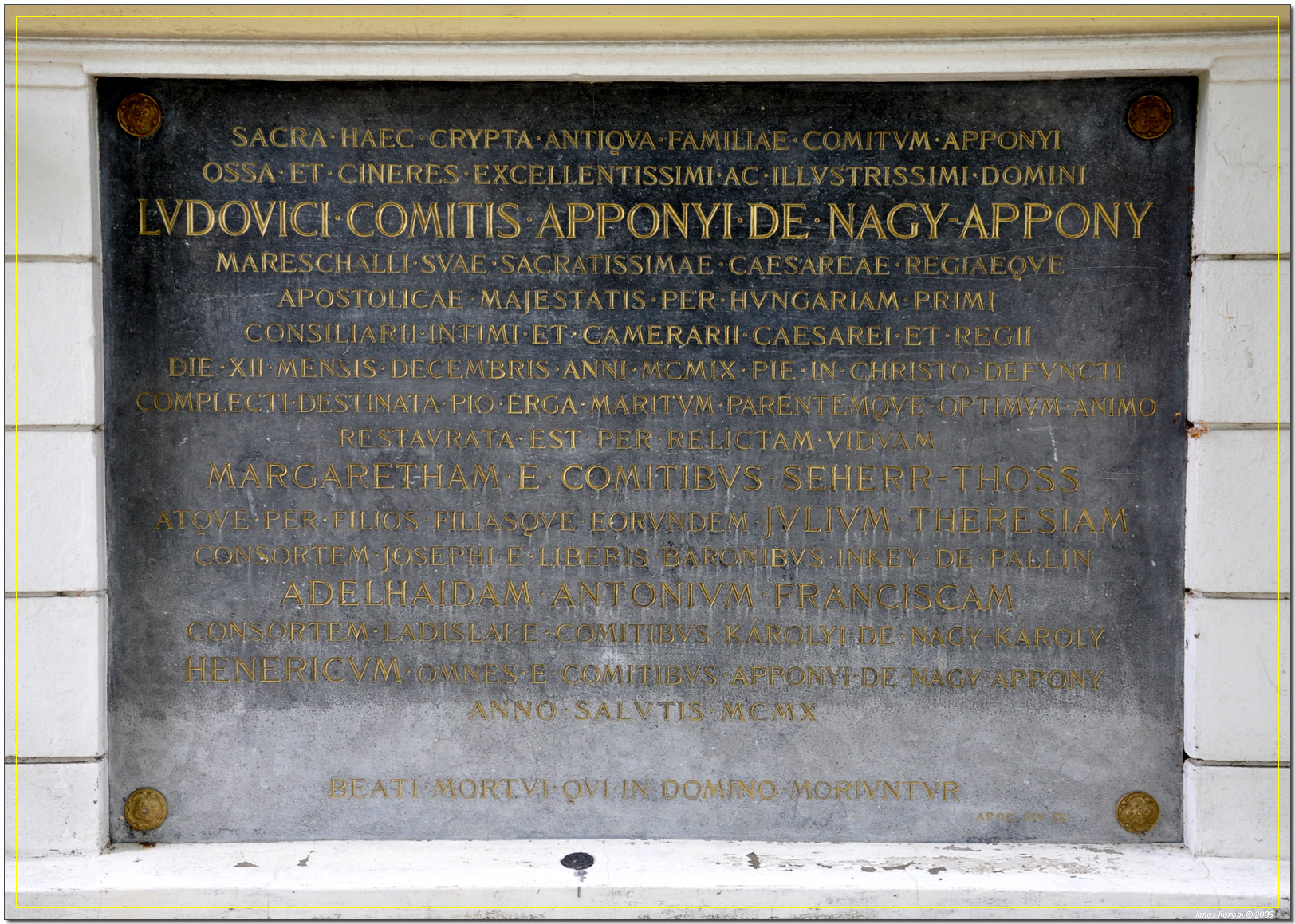
Memorial plaque of Count Lajos Apponyi

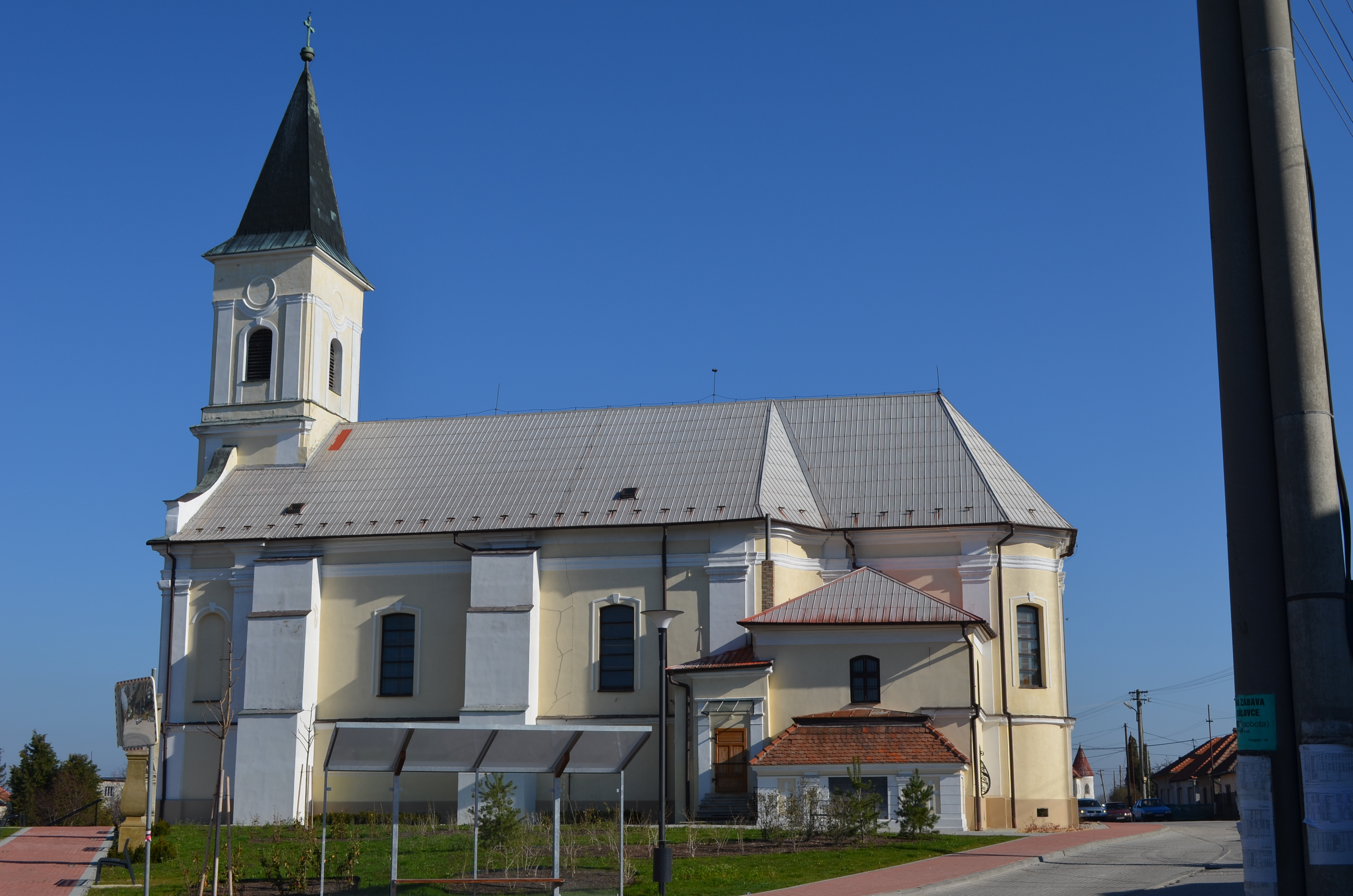
Side view with the Apponyi family crypt on the right
