= List of libraries in Slovakia =

This is a list of libraries in Slovakia.

== Libraries by region ==
=== Banská Bystrica ===
- Ľudovít Štúr Regional Library, Zvolen
- State Research Library in Banská Bystrica

=== Bratislava ===
- Central Library of the Slovak Academy of Sciences, Bratislava
- Comenius University Library, Bratislava
- Slovak Medical Library
- University Library, Bratislava

=== Košice ===
- Ján Bocatí Public Library, Košice
- University Library of the Technical University in Košice

=== Nitra ===
- Karol Kmeťek Regional Library in Nitra
- Slovak Agricultural Library at the Slovak University of Agriculture in Nitra

=== Prešov ===
- Podtatranska Library, Poprad
- Slovak Library for the Blind M. Hrebenda (Slovak: Slovenská knižnica pre nevidiacich M. Hrebendu), Levoča
- University of Prešov Library

=== Trenčín ===
- Michal Rešetka Public Library in Trenčín

=== Trnava ===
- Juraj Fándly Library in Trnava (Slovak: Knižnica Juraja Fándlyho v Trnave)

=== Žilina ===
- Slovak National Library, Martin
- Turčianska Library in Martin
- University of Žilina Library

== See also ==
- Mass media in Slovakia
- Slovak literature

in other languages

- Library system of the Slovak Republic (in Slovak)
- List of academic libraries in Slovakia (in Slovak)
- List of archives in Slovakia (in Czech)
- List of municipal libraries in Slovakia (in Slovak)
- List of regional libraries in Slovakia (in Slovak)
