= Slovak National Library =

National library of Slovakia

- Slovenská národná knižnica
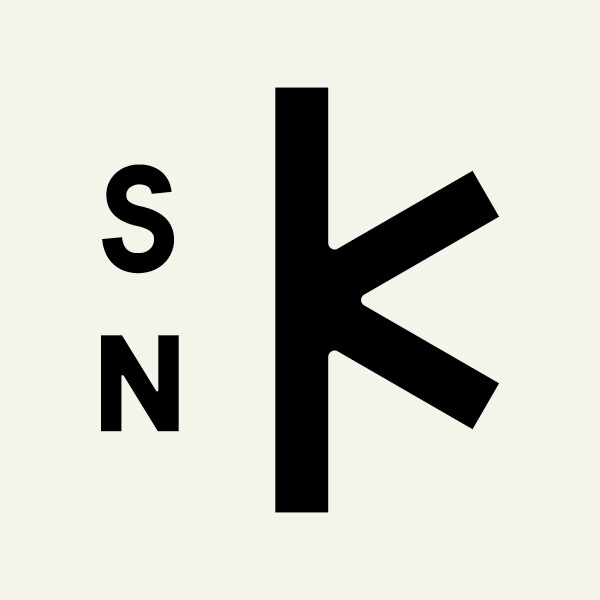

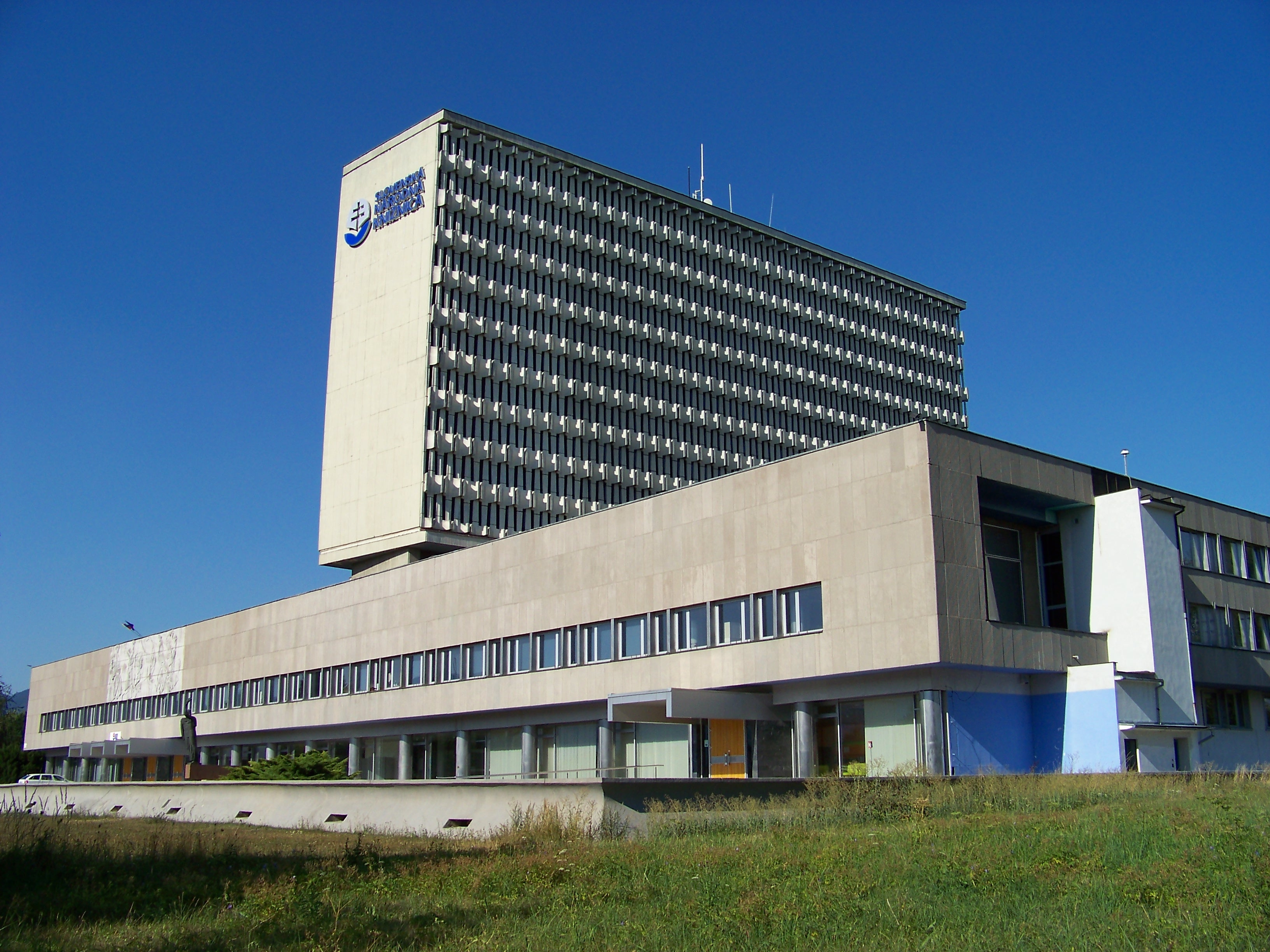
- 49.06907627215773°N 18.93327843275941°E
- Location: Slovakia
- Type: National Library
- Established: 2000
- Reference to legal mandate: Act No. 183/2000

Collection
- Items collected: Preferably collects, professionally processes, stores, protects and makes accessible domestic and foreign Slavic documents (documents related to Slovakia by author, language, place of printing, theme)
- Legal deposit: Yes

Other information
- Website: https://www.snk.sk/en/

The Slovenská národná knižnica (in English: Slovak National Library) is a modern scientific, cultural, information and educational institution that serves all citizens of Slovakia and users from abroad. Slovak National Library is conservation and depositary library of Slovakia. SNL preferably collects, professionally processes, stores, protects and makes accessible domestic and foreign Slavic documents (documents related to Slovakia by author, language, place of printing, theme). Funds and collections of the Slovak National Library contain 4.9 million library items, 1.7 million archive documents and thousands of museum units.

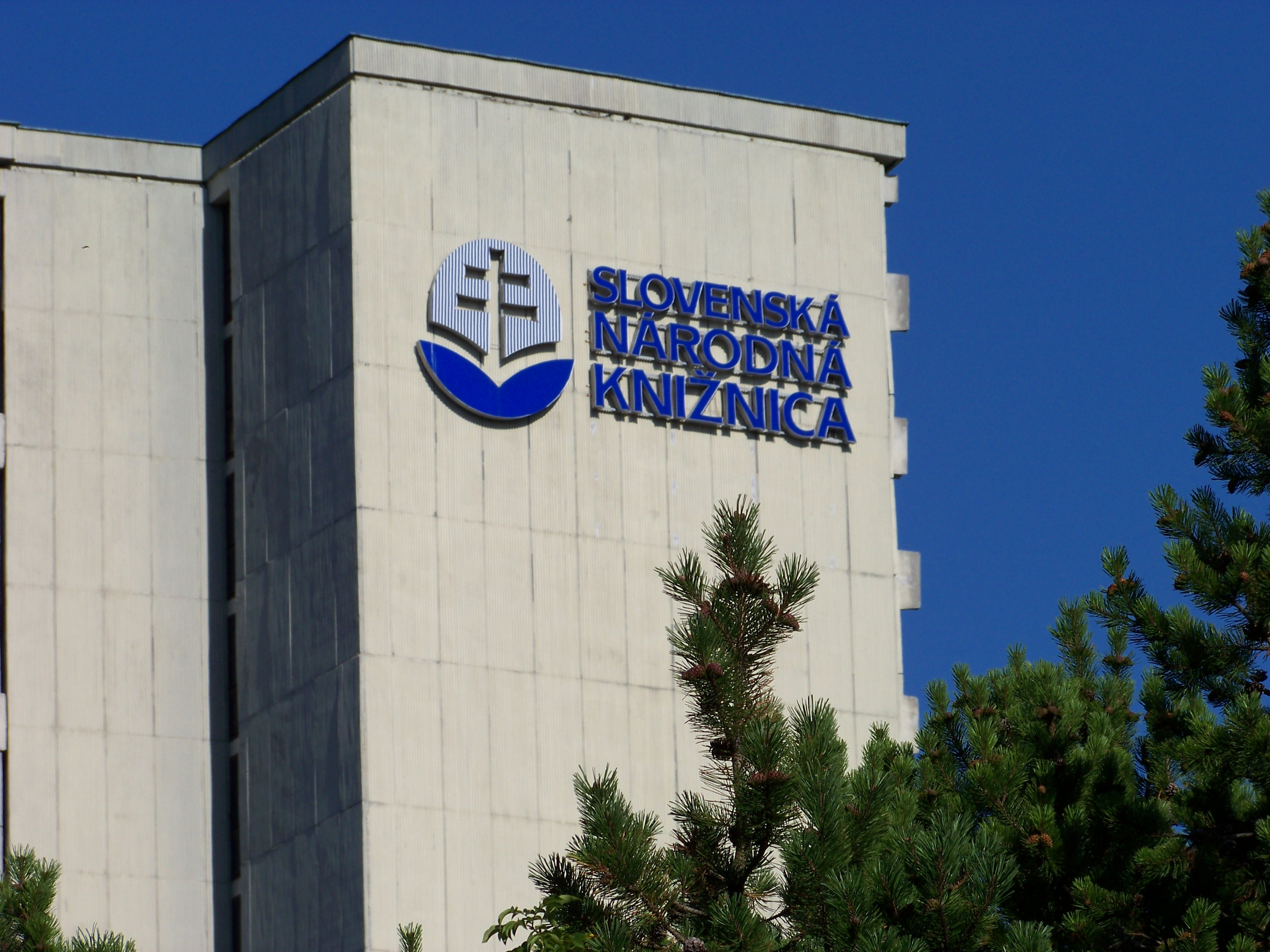
Slovak National Library, Martin, detail

Part of the SNL are also museums. Literary Museum collects objects related to Slovak literature, on which it presents a historical development of Slovak literature. Museum is also involved in presentation of the National Cemetery, gallery of graves of outstanding personalities from Slovak cultural, scientific and national life. Slavic Museum of Alexander Sergeyevich Pushkin, located in manor-house of Pushkin family in Brodzany, dedicated to one of the greatest Russian poets, documents literary relations between Slovak and Slavic literatures. SNL also manages the historical library of the Apponyi family, located in Oponice castle.

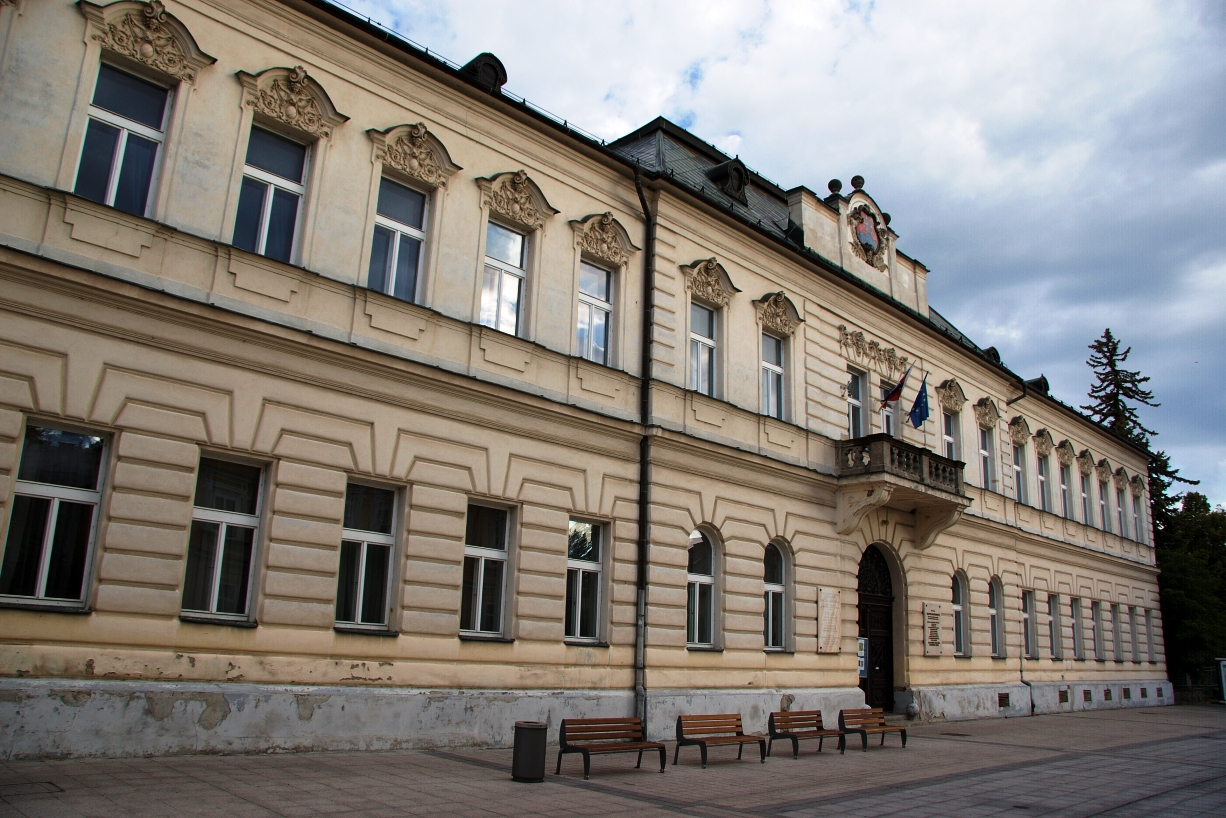
Literary Museum of the SNL

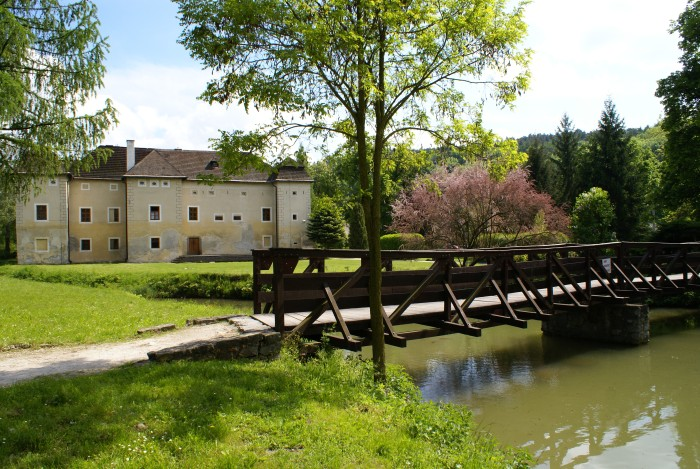
Slavic Museum of Alexander Sergeyevich Pushkin, Brodzany

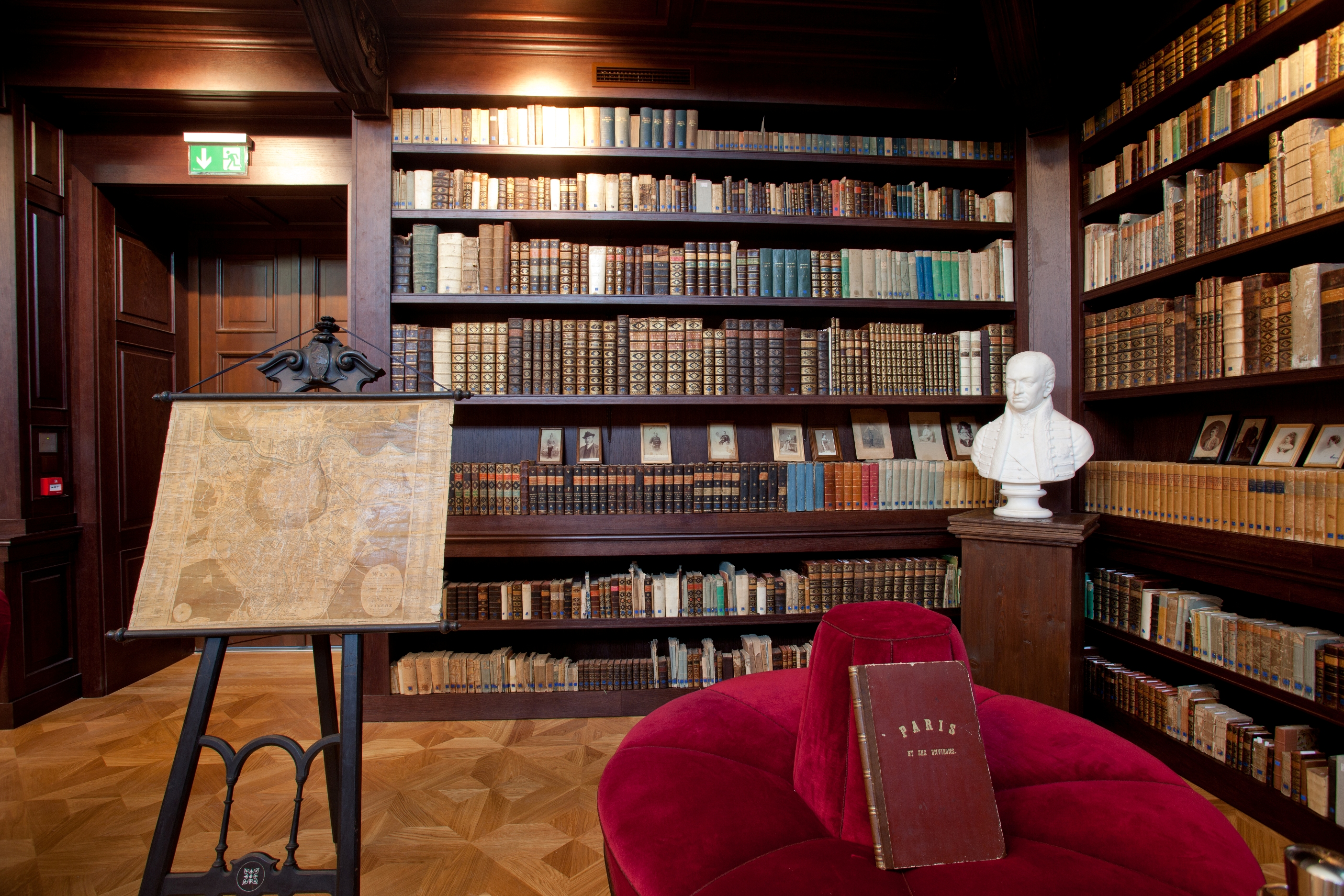
The historical Apponyi Library (managed by the SNL), located in situ in Oponice castle

Slovak National Library coordinated the development of the library system of the Slovak republic and provides modernization of library and information services. SNL directly cooperates with slovak and foreign institutions on international projects solutions. In 2010 the SNL became a solver of national project Digital Library and Digital Archive (DIKDA) co-funded by the European Regional Development Fund (ERDF). Through the DIKDA project SNL makes public digitized works from its collections.

== Location ==
Slovak National Library is located in Martin.
Address: Slovak National Library, J. C. Hronský Square 1, 036 01 Martin, Slovakia
GPS: 49.068974, 18.932982

== Mission ==
Slovak National Library is in accordance with Act No. 183/2000 with amendments and supplements - Act of libraries, since its foundation in 2000 (until year 2000 SNL was a part of Matica slovenská) the SNL is National Library of the Slovak Republic and state cultural, informational, scientific and educational institution in the library, bibliographic, literary museum, literary archive and biographical activities. The founder of the Slovak National Library is the Ministry of Culture of the Slovak Republic.

The mission of the SNL is through library and information services and information technology ensure free access to information distributed on all media, build, protect and made available library, archive and museum funds and collections with relation to documentation of Slovak literature development and book culture and thus meet the cultural, information, scientific research and educational needs of people.

Slovak National Library:

- is a conservation library and the depository library of the Slovak Republic
- collects, professionally processes, stores, preserves and makes available domestic and foreign Slavic documents related to Slovakia
- is the national bibliographic agency, which coordinates the national bibliographic system, processing and access to the Slovak national bibliography
- is a literary archive, literary museum and biographical documentation, conducting research, preservation and promotion of Slovak culture and literature
- is the advisor, coordinator, trainer and statistical institute of the library system
- is the national agency for international standard numbering of documents and international identification documents (ISBN and ISMN)
- standardization and scientific-research institute of library system
- is the national headquarters for interlibrary loan service and international interlibrary loan services
- manages and protects historical library documents and historical library funds
- comments on the draft declaration and abolition of historical library documents and historical library collections and determines its value
- keep a central register of historical library documents and historical library funds
- comments on the application for consent for the permanent export of a document or set of documents, which for its exceptional value it is possible for a declaration historical library or historical library documents
- is the national center for the area of restoration, preservation, conservation and digitization of library documents
- manages the Libraries Union Catalogue of monographs and co-ordination of union catalogs of libraries

== Services ==
The Slovak National Library provides library and information services in its settlement building in Martin or online services:

- loan services (including both taking a book home and in-house use in the reading room)
- interlibrary and international interlibrary loan services
- information retrieval and reference services
- reading rooms (Universal study-room, multimedia, microfilm reading room, reading rooms of Literary Archive and National Institut of Biography)
- Information Science Centre
- access / remote access to electronic information sources
- Public internet
- Centre for Patent Information
- Wi-fi

== Readers ==
The Slovak National Library library cards are available to every Slovak citizen, beginning from age 15. Non-Slovak citizens may also obtain a library card with either an identification card, passport or student identification card. Library cards are valid for one year.

== Literature ==
HANAKOVIČ, Štefan. 2013. Dejiny Slovenskej národnej knižnice : historické predpoklady, podmienky jej vzniku a účinkovania do roku 1960 : úvahy a svedectvá. Martin : Slovenská národná knižnica, 2013. 331 s. ISBN 9788081490200.

== See also ==
- List of libraries in Slovakia
