= Apponyi Library =

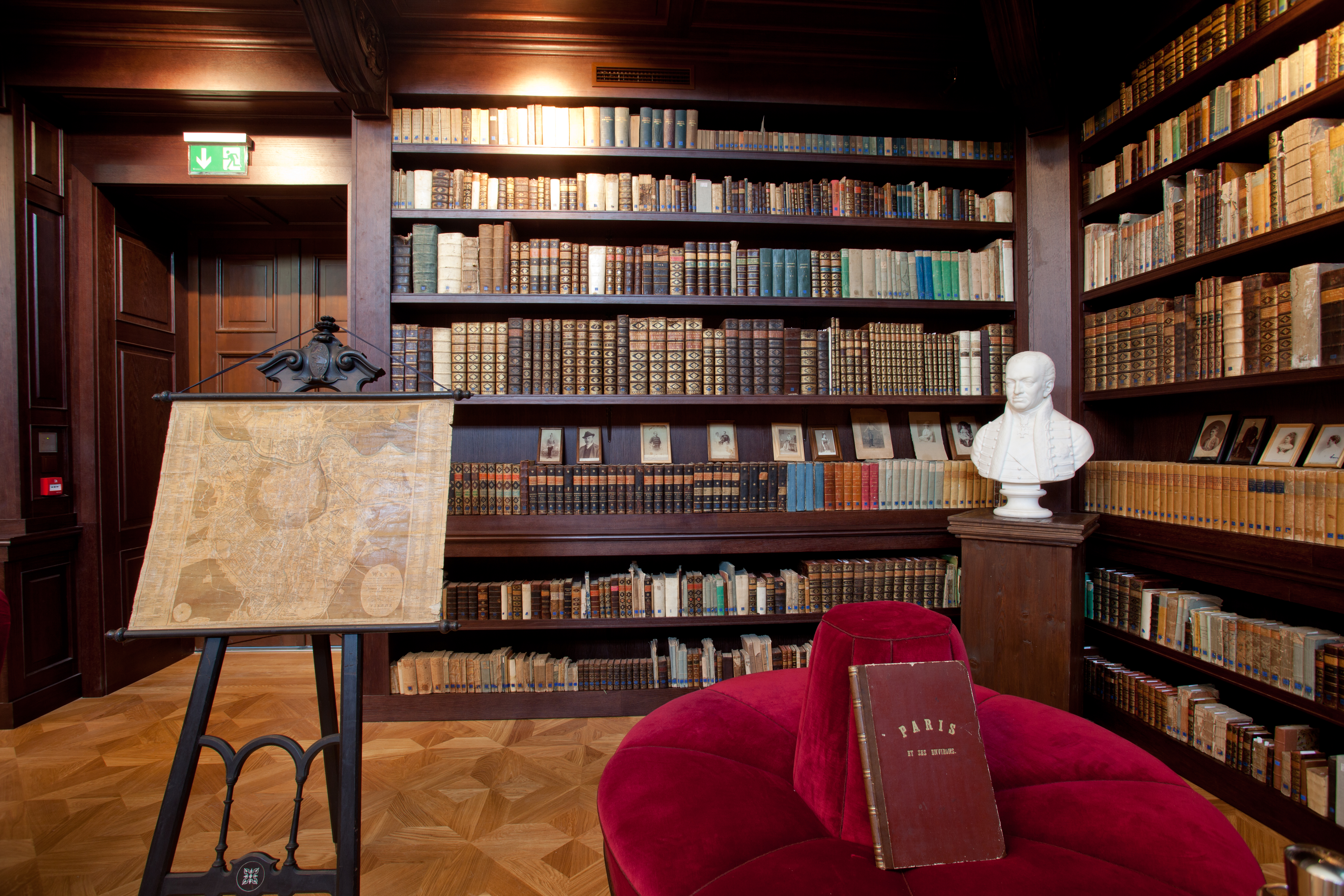
Interior view of the restored Apponyi Library in Oponice

The Apponyi Library or (in Latin) Bibliotheca Apponiana refers to the book and print collection initially assembled in Vienna by Count Anton Georg (or Antal György) Apponyi and maintained with alterations by his descendants in the Apponyi family until 1935. It is now part of the Slovak National Library and preserved in the former Apponyi family castle in Oponice, Slovakia.

== History ==
Anton Georg Apponyi started the collection around 1774 and had already amassed 30,000 volumes by the late 1770s. He kept most of his collection in Vienna, with some items held in his Hungarian country castle in Hőgyész. Following his death in 1817, his son Anton (Antal) bought out his siblings' share, for the financing of which he had to sell several thousands of books. In 1825, Anton Apponyi decided to move it all to a dedicated building open to the public in Pressburg (Pozsony, today's Bratislava), making it the first public library in the territory of today's Slovakia. The move was celebrated at the time as a Hungarian patriotic gesture, since Pressburg was then part of the Kingdom of Hungary. The building in Kecske Street (German: Geissgasse, today in Slovak: Kozia ulica), no longer extant, was ceremonially opened in the spring of 1827, with a monumental facade displaying the Apponyi heraldic arms and the Latin inscription LITERIS IN PATRIA AUGENDIS ("for the development of letters in the fatherland"). In 1846, following disagreements with the municipality on the library's management and cost-sharing, Anton Apponyi closed the Pressburg facility and moved its content to the Apponyi family's ancestral home in Appony (now Oponice, Slovakia), where a dedicated neoclassical wing was built for that purpose.

The library stayed there until World War II, despite some of its contents being dispersed in sales because of the Apponyi family's recurrent financial needs. In particular, Count Lajos Apponyi sold a "choice portion" of it "comprising extraordinarily rare works" at Sotheby's in London in November 1892. More of the contents was dispersed in the late 1930s following the end of Apponyi family ownership of the Oponice domain in 1935, and lost to negligence during Communism. Some of remaining books were transferred by the Matica slovenská to its facility in Bratislava in 1965, then all of them (including those in Bratislava) to Martin in 1972, while the wooden interior of the library wing in Oponice was destroyed. The damaged books were restored in Martin, then the library was again transferred to storage in Diviaky (Turčianske Teplice) in 1992, and eventually reinstalled in Oponice in 2011 following the Apponyi castle's renovation.

== Librarians and scholars ==
The creation of the library owes much to Agostino Michelazzi (1732–1820), a former Jesuit who built it up on behalf of Count Anton Georg Apponyi.

The next major figure in the library's management was Karl Anton Gruber von Grubenfels (1760–1840), a lesser nobleman from Szeged who also authored a number of fiction works, poems and theater plays in German as well as a Historia linguae ungaricae (History of the Hungarian Language) published in Pressburg in 1830. Gruber appears to have been instrumental in persuading Count Anton Apponyi to move the library from Vienna to Pressburg in the early 1820s, and remained Librarian of the Apponyi Public Library until 1833.

Franciscan friar and historian Vševlad J. Gajdoš (1907–1978) studied and preserved the Apponyi Library while working at the Matica slovenská between 1956 and 1958.

As of 2015, the Custodian of the Apponyi Library was Peter Králik. In 2012 he received the Crystal Wing Award for his role in the restoration of the library.

== Current status ==
The remaining portion of the original collection has been kept since 2011 in the renovated Apponyi Castle in Oponice, Slovakia as a branch of the Slovak National Library, together with parts of the collection assembled by the Zay (or Zai) family from Uhrovec (Ugrócz), formerly stored in Bojnice Castle and also studied by Vševlad J. Gajdoš. The rest of the castle is operated as a luxury hotel, branded Chateau-Appony.

Most of the Library's books are in Latin, French and German. Fewer titles are in Italian, Hungarian and Russian. There are also some in Spanish, Arabic and Hebrew, but none in Slovak. This is ironic but not surprising, given the comparatively late emergence of Slovak as a written language, and the Apponyi family's association with Magyarization policies.

In chronological terms, 3% of the prints are from the 16th century, 13% from the 17th century, 33% from the 18th century, 37% from the 19th century, and 12% from the 20th century, with the remaining 1.5% without indication of publication date.

== See also ==
- Oponice
- Apponyi family
