= Three Chestnut Horses =

Novel

- First edition cover
- Author: Margita Figuli
- Original title: Tri gaštanové kone
- Translator: John Minahane
- Cover artist: Jozef Cincík
- Language: Slovak
- Genre: Romance novel, Christian novel
- Set in: Northern Slovakia, 1930s
- Published: 1940
- Publisher: Matica slovenská
- Publication place: Slovak State
- English publication date: 2014
- Media type: Print: hardback
- Pages: 163
- Dewey Decimal: 891.8735
- LC Class: PG5438.F47 T7513
- Preceded by: Olovený vták
- Followed by: Tri noci a tri sny

Three Chestnut Horses (Slovak: Tri gaštanové kone) is a 1940 novel by Margita Figuli in the Slovak language.

== Plot ==
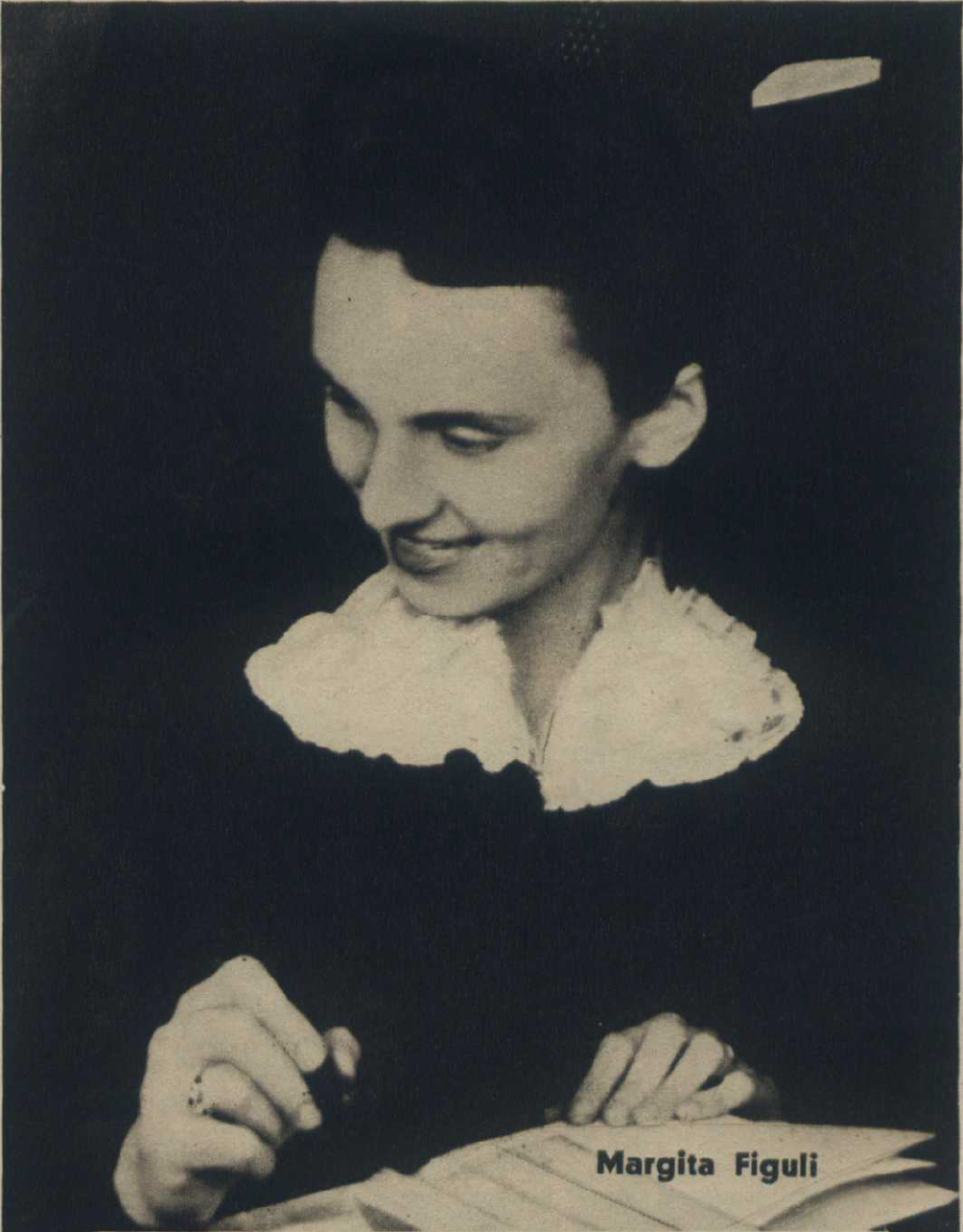
Author Margita Figuli, pictured in 1939

In the mountains of Slovakia, Peter has been in love with Magdalena since childhood and asks her to marry him. However, her mother promises her to a cruel, rich farmer, Jano Zapotočný. Magdalena promises Peter that she will put off marrying Jano if Peter can prove himself capable of making a living, but tragedy intervenes in their lives.

== Reception ==
In Slovakia, Three Chestnut Horses was an immediate success, running through eight editions in seven years. is considered a beloved classic. In Women Writers of Great Britain and Europe: An Encyclopedia, Norma L. Rudinsky noted that "[Magdalena and Peter's] spiritual growth through tragedy to a happy ending is mythologized by three horses symbolizing the goodness, beauty and strength of nature as well as the same three qualities gained by obedience to the Christian moral code."

During the period of communist Czechoslovakia, the book was published with several religious passages excised.

Prof. Sarah Hinlicky Wilson awarded it five stars, saying "Three Chestnut Horses as an authentically religious book is a good antidote […] It won’t heal the wounds of living, but it will give you enough balm to carry on to the next encounter."
