= Henrik Apponyi =

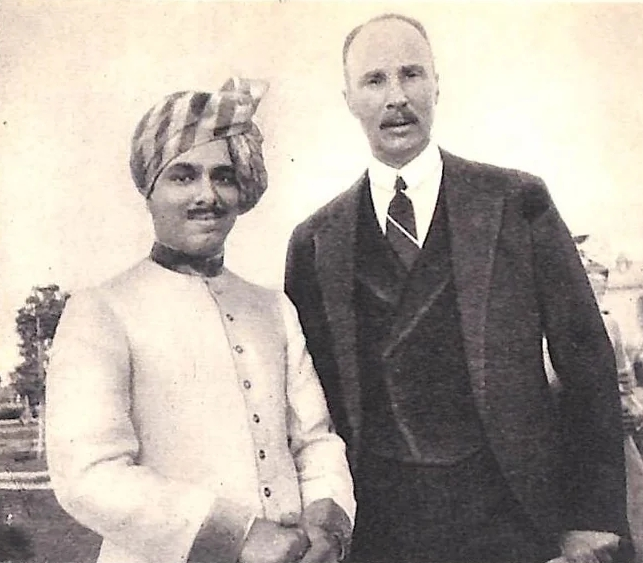
The Raja of Mandi and Henrik Apponyi, 1930

Count Henrik "Magi" Apponyi (1 January 1885 – 5 December 1935) was a Hungarian noble, traveller, hunter and writer. Above five years before his death, he travelled through British India on a hunting trip and wrote a book on the topic. Educated in England, he introduced many English fashions such as horse polo and English-style hunting to Hungary.

== Life and work ==
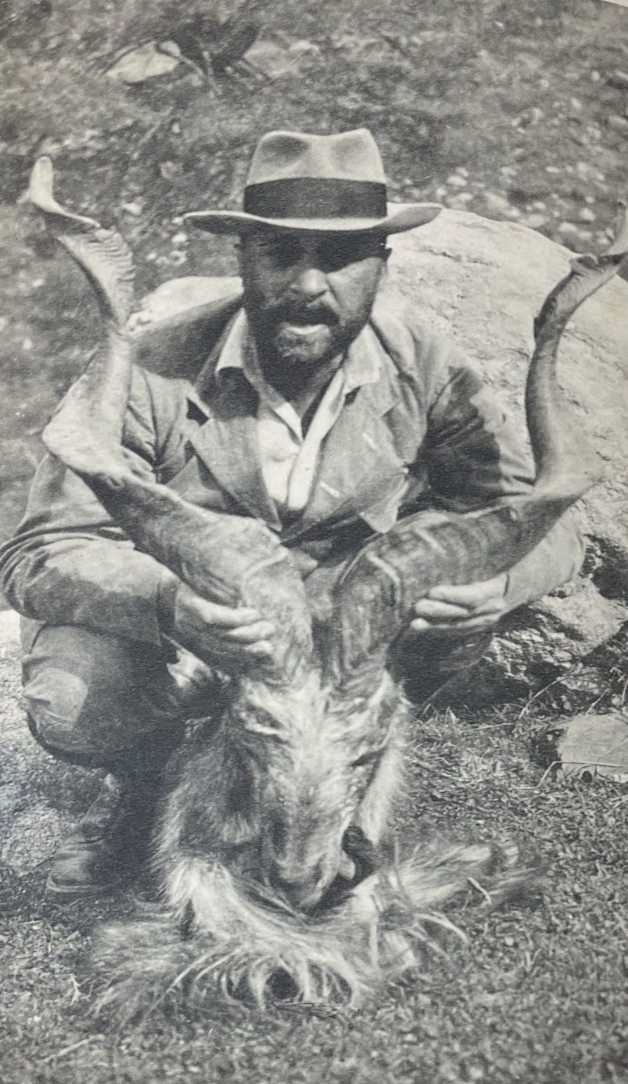
With a Markhor

Apponyi was born in Vienna and came from a well-known Hungarian Apponyi family of nobles, his father Lajos was a member of the Austro-Hungarian court married to Margarete Apponyi de Nagy-Appony von Seherr-Thoß (1848 - 1931). He studied in Budapest and then at Magdalen College, Oxford, and passed the diplomats exam in Budapest in 1909. He worked in the ministry of commerce and in 1909 he became an attache in the embassy in Berlin and in Constantinople. During World War I he served as a lieutenant. With the fall of the Habsburg monarchy, he was forced to sell of his land, forests, library and finally his castle due to falling fortunes after the war. The Apponyi library founded by his ancestor Juraj Anton Apponyi was one of the largest in Vienna with 30 thousand books. He gave up politics, moved to Oponice, and began to travel and hunt. In 1924 he went on a hunting expedition to Sudan and then to India in 1930 along with his friends Marie Mayr-Melnhof, Denise and Jozsef Wenckheim. He also visited America in 1933. Through his Oxford friends he was able to obtain introductions to the Viceroy Lord Irwin and several Indian princes including the Maharaja of Bikaner and the Maharaja of Patiala. Through these introductions he was able to hunt tigers in the Terai and visit the Ladakh region. He went on a hunt for sandgrouse and noted that the Bikaner rajas claimed a record shoot of 5,500 birds in three hours with 35 guns. He donated a skin to the Hungarian natural history museum. While in London in 1930, he was introduced to Gandhi by the Maharaja of Bikaner. He was later visited in Hungary by the Maharaja of Bikaner and the Maharaja of Patiala. He died in Berlin under unknown circumstances and was buried in Oponice in the family tomb. An English translation of his travels in India was published posthumously.

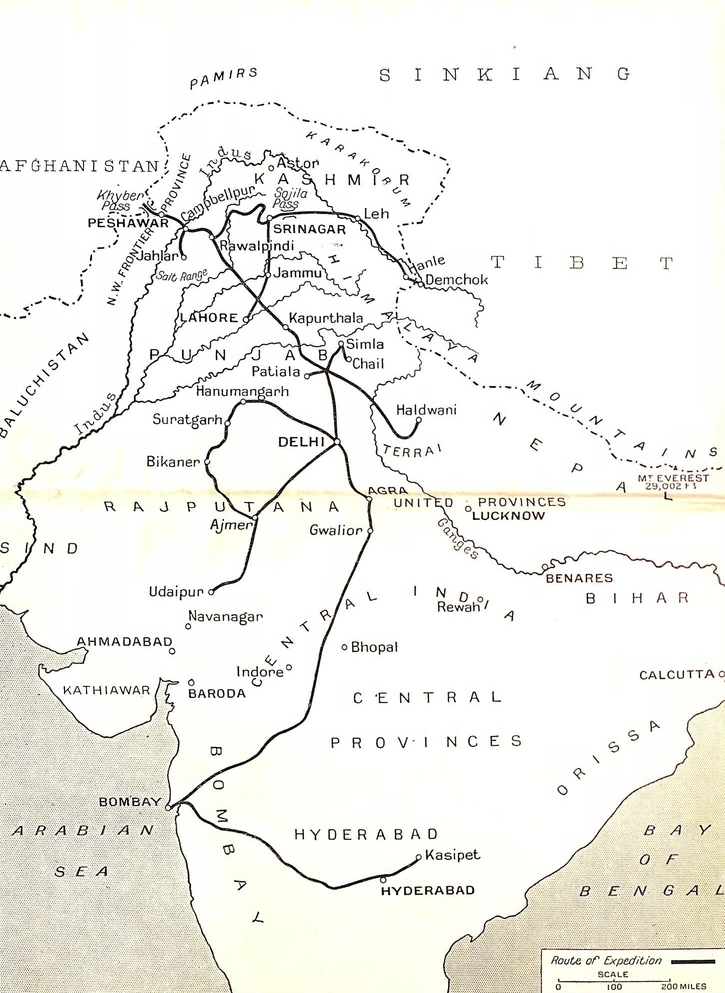
Travel route

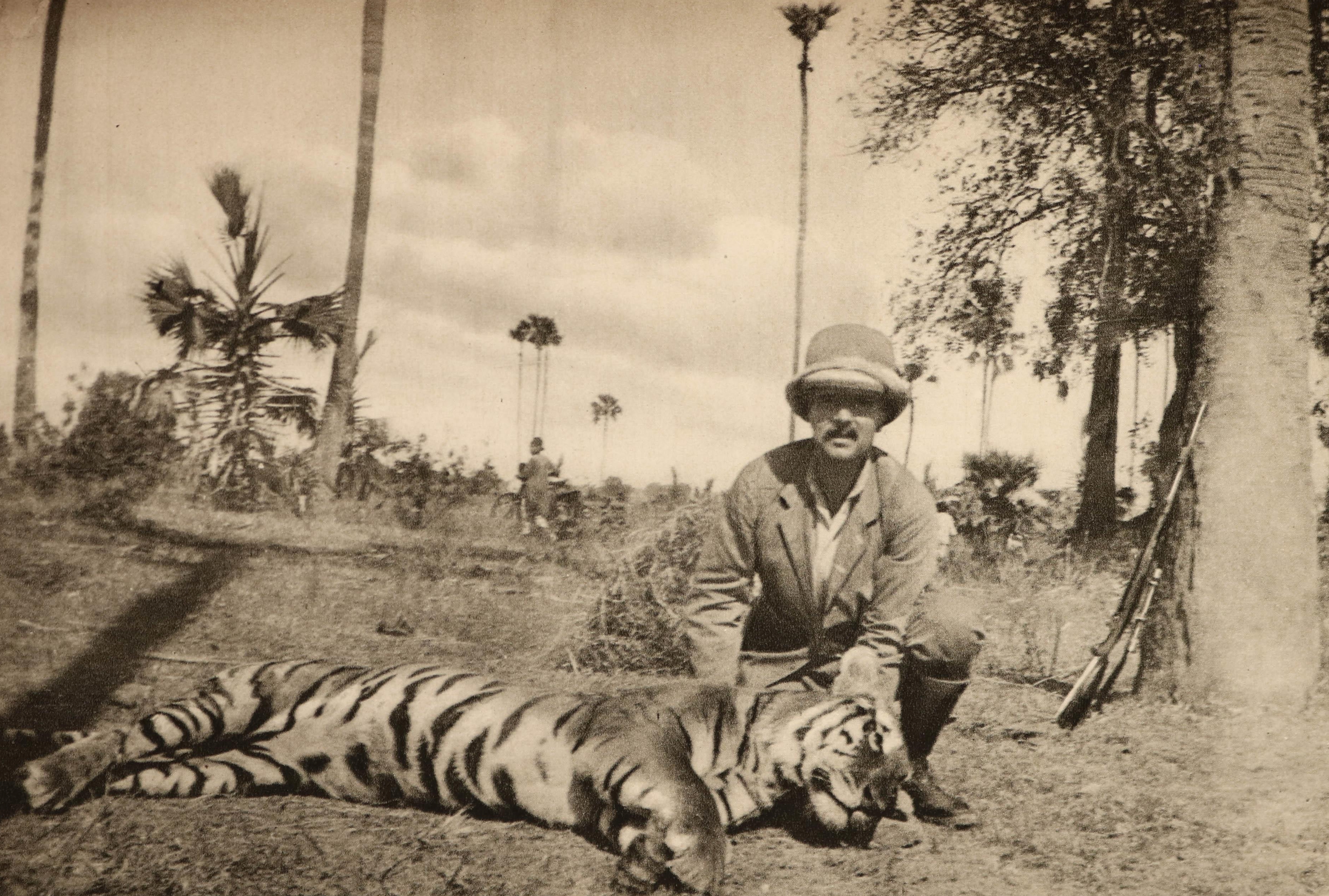
Tiger shot in Hyderabad state

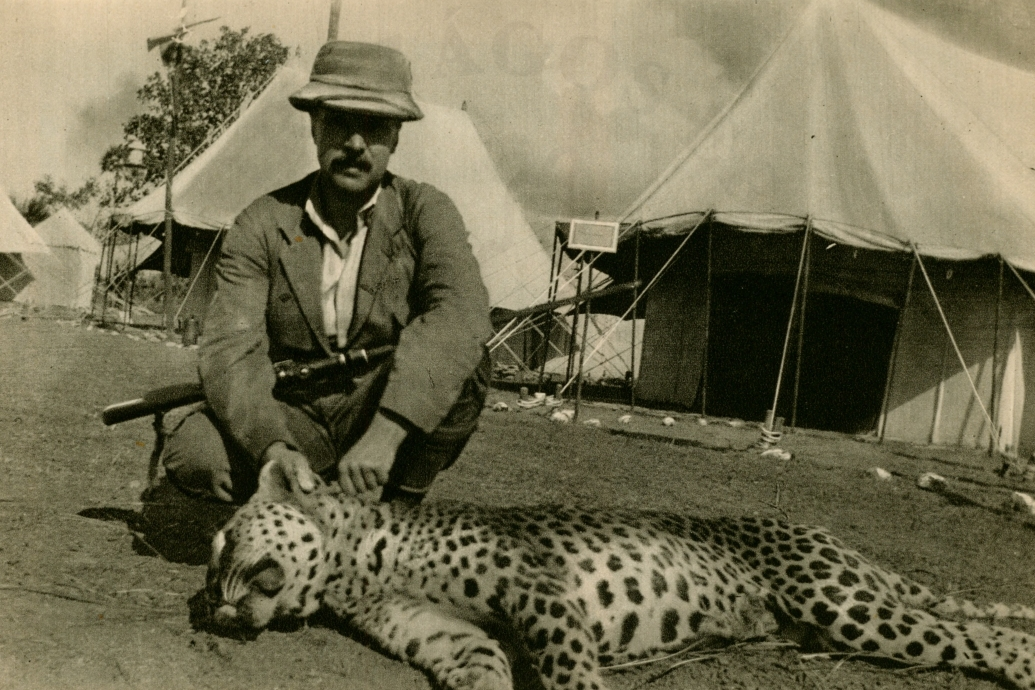
Leopard shot in Hyderabad state

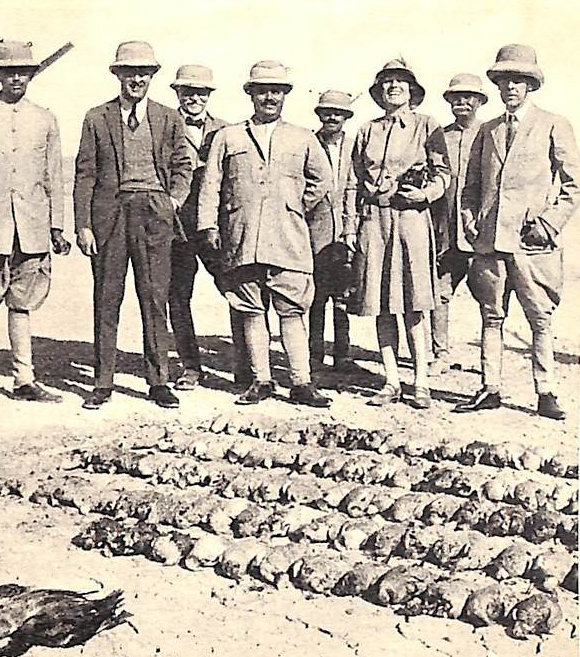
Morning shoot of sandgrouse in Bikaner, January 1930

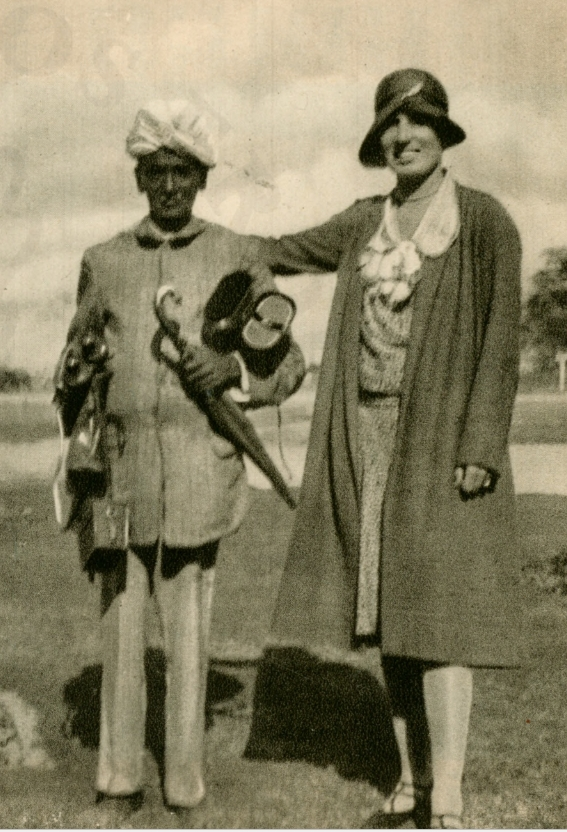
Marie in Delhi
