= Ľudo Ondrejov =

Slovak poet and prose writer

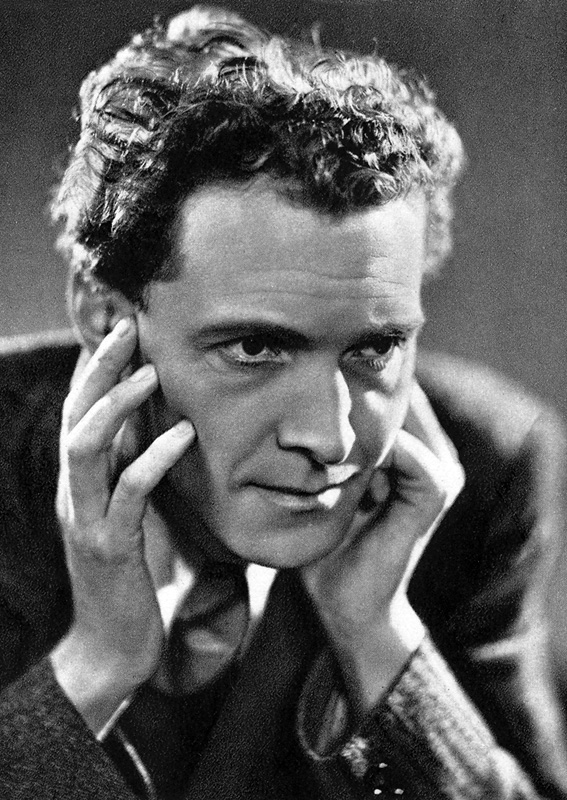
- Ľudo Ondrejov, Slovak poet and writer
- Born: 19 October 1901; Slanje, present day Croatia
- Died: 18 March 1962 (aged 60); Bratislava, Czechoslovakia, present day Slovakia
- Occupation: Author

Ľudo Ondrejov (19 October 1901 in Slanje, present day Croatia – 18 March 1962 in Bratislava, Czechoslovakia) was a Slovak poet and prose writer.

== Biography ==
Ľudo Ondrejov was born in a Slovak family in Slanje, Austro-Hungarian Empire (today part of Donji Martijanec, Croatia) on 18 March 1901. He spent most of his childhood in the Kingdom of Hungary in a small village Kostiviarska (today part of Banská Bystrica). He moved to Bratislava in 1938 and became a professional writer. Ľudo Ondrejov was a member of a partisan group in 1944–45. During World War II he was given a bookstore as a part of the Aryanization in Slovakia.

== Works ==
=== Writing career ===
Ondrejov's first works were published in periodicals such as Slovenské pohľady (Slovak views). His first book was published in 1932. He wrote prose and poetry for adults and children. Ondrejov was a significant member of the Slovak school of naturalism. Ondrejov also wrote fictional travelogues.

=== List of selected works ===
Poetry

- 1932 – Martin Nociar Jakubovie
- 1932 – Bez návratu (No return)
- 1936 – Mámenie (Wheedling)
- 1956 – Básne (Poems)

Prose

- 1932 – Rozprávky z hôr (Fairy tales from the mountains)
- 1936 – Africký zápisník (African itinerary)
- 1936 – Horami Sumatry(Through the mountains of Sumatra)
- Slnko vychádza nad hory (The Sun is rising over the hills) trilogy
  - 1937 – Zbojnícka mladosť (Outlaw's youth)
  - 1939 – Jerguš Lapin (also the name of the main character in the first two volumes)
  - 1950 – Na zemi sú tvoje hviezdy (Your stars are on the ground)

== Criticism ==
During the Second World War he Aryanized the second-hand bookshop of the Jewish family of Steiners in Bratislava. Moreover, when the deportation of Jews started, he said that in his company no Jew was needed and he reported them to the authorities:

"I declare that in this bookstore I do not need these Jews: Max Steiner, Joseph Steiner, Sigismund Steiner and Viliam Steiner. By securing and deporting those Jews neither the trade nor the Slovak state will suffer any economic damage, because I have found compensation in the Aryan person Mr. Viliam Fabry from the St. Martin."

These people later died in concentration camps.
