= Margita Figuli =

Slovak writer and translator (1909–1995)

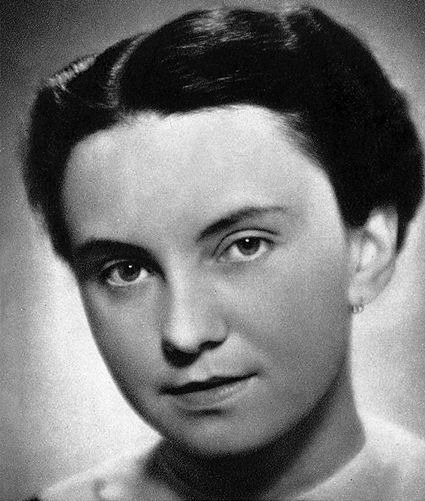
- Photograph, 1937
- Born: 2 October 1909; Vyšný Kubín, Árva County, Austria-Hungary (in modern Slovakia)
- Died: 27 March 1995 (aged 85); Bratislava, Slovakia
- Resting place: Slávičie údolie cemetery, Bratislava
- Education: Business school in Banská Bystrica
- Occupation: novelist
- Spouse: Jozef Šuster (m. 1939–1980; his death)
- Writing career
- Pen name: Ol'ga Morena
- Language: Slovak
- Years active: 1930–1980
- Notable work: Three Chestnut Horses
- Notable awards: Zaslúžilý umelec (Artist of Merit, 1964); Národný umelec (National Artist, 1974)
- Movement: Naturalism

Margita Figuli (2 October 1909 – 27 March 1995; known after her marriage as Margita Šustrová and by the penname Oľga Morena) was a Slovak prose writer, translator and author of literature for children and young people.

== Biography ==
Margita Figuli was born in a farmer's family in Vyšný Kubín. After her studies in Banská Bystrica, she moved to Bratislava to work in a bank, while writing; her earliest stories were published in 1937. She then worked as an English correspondent at Tatrabanka until 1941 when she was fired due to the publication of Olovený vták which publicly the German invasion of Poland; after this then she focused on writing and translating.

She died in Bratislava in 1995.

== Works ==
=== Writing ===
Margita Figuli is a significant representative of the Slovak school of naturalism. Her works started to be published in 1930 in Slovenská nedeľa (Slovak Sunday), Elán (Spirit), Slovenské pohľady (Slovak views) and other periodicals. Love, compassion, and current social problems were prevalent in her writing. A devout Christian, she wrote the biblical historical novel Babylon which portrayed the fall of the Chaldean empire to the Persians. Her best works were translated into German, Russian, Polish, and other languages.

=== List of selected works ===
Prose

- 1932 – List od otca (Letter from father)
- 1938 – Čierny býk (Black bull)
- 1940 – Olovený vták (Lead bird)
- 1940 – Tri gaštanové kone (Three Chestnut Horses)
- 1942 – Tri noci a tri sny (Three nights and three dreams)
- 1946 – Babylon (Parts 1 and 2)
- 1973 – Rebeka (Rebecca)
- 1974 – Vietor v nás (Wind within us)

For children and young people

- 1963 – Môj prvý list (My first letter)
- 1964 – Ariadnina niť (Ariadna's yarn)
- 1980 – Balada o Jurovi Jánošíkovi (Ballad about Juro Jánošík)
