= Tolna County 3rd constituency =

Parliamentary constituency in Hungary

- Constituency for the National Assembly
- Location of Tolna county 03 within Tolna county

- Location of Tolna county within Hungary
- County: Tolna County
- Population: 70,362 (2022)
- Major settlements: Paks

Current constituency
- Created: 2011
- Party: Tisza Party
- Member: Tamás Cseh
- Elected: 2026

The Tolna County 3rd parliamentary constituency is one of the 106 constituencies into which the territory of Hungary is divided by Act CCIII of 2011, and in which voters can elect one member of parliament. The standard abbreviation of the name of the constituency is: Tolna 03. OEVK. Seat: Paks.

== Area ==
The constituency includes the following settlements:

1. Belecska
2. Bikács
3. Bölcske
4. Dunaföldvár
5. Dunaszentgyörgy
6. Felsőnyék
7. Fürged
8. Gerjen
9. Gyönk
10. Györköny
11. Iregszemcse
12. Kajdacs
13. Keszőhidegkút
14. Kisszékely
15. Madocsa
16. Magyarkeszi
17. Miszla
18. Nagydorog
19. Nagyszékely
20. Nagyszokoly
21. Németkér
22. Ozora
23. Paks
24. Pálfa
25. Pári
26. Pincehely
27. Pusztahencse
28. Regöly
29. Sárszentlőrinc
30. Simontornya
31. Szárazd
32. Tamási
33. Tolnanémedi
34. Udvari

== Members of parliament ==
| Name | Party | Term | Election |
|---|---|---|---|
| Ferenc Hirt | Fidesz-KDNP | 2014 – 2018 | Results of the 2014 parliamentary election: |
| János Süli | Fidesz-KDNP | 2018 – | Results of the 2018 parliamentary election: |
| János Süli | Fidesz-KDNP | 2018 – | Results of the 2022 parliamentary election: |
| Tamás Cseh | Tisza Party | 2026 – present | Results of the 2026 parliamentary election: 47.42% |

== Demographics ==
Historical population
| Year | Pop. | ±% |
|---|---|---|
| 2011 | 77,238 | — |
| 2022 | 70,362 | −8.9% |

The demographics of the constituency are as follows. The population of Tolna County's 3rd constituency was 70,362 on October 1, 2022. The population of the constituency decreased by 6,876 between the 2011 and 2022 censuses. Based on the age composition, the majority of the population in the constituency is middle-aged with 25,533 people, while the least is children with 12,416 people. 80.4% of the population of the constituency has internet access.

According to the highest level of completed education, those with a high school diploma are the most numerous, with 17,416 people, followed by skilled workers with 16,275 people.

According to economic activity, almost half of the population is employed, 32,476 people, the second most significant group is inactive earners, who are mainly pensioners, with 19,156 people.

The most significant ethnic group in the constituency is German with 1,522 people and Gypsy with 1,390 people. The proportion of foreign citizens without Hungarian citizenship is 1.2%.

According to religious composition, the largest religion of the residents of the constituency is Roman Catholic (19,340 people), and there is also a significant community of Calvinists (5,537 people). The number of people not belonging to a religious community is also significant (7,655 people), the second largest group in the constituency after the Roman Catholic religion.

== Parliamentary elections ==
2026 parliamentary election: Tolna 3rd
| Party | Candidate | Votes | % | ±% |
|---|---|---|---|---|
| Tisza | Tamás Cseh | 20,880 | 47.42 | New |
| Fidesz–KDNP | János Süli | 19,987 | 45.39 | −17.59 |
| Mi Hazánk | Zoltán Janecska | 2,662 | 6.05 | −0.71 |
| DK | Erzsébet Dobos | 416 | 0.94 | −26.93 |
| MMP–S | Sándor Szarka | 87 | 0.20 | New |
| Majority | | 893 | 2.03 | |
| Turnout | | 44,340 | 78.10 | +9.12 |
| Registered electors | | 56,773 | | −3.68 |
| Tisza gain from Fidesz-KDNP | | Swing | | |

== Sources ==
- ↑ Vjt.: "2011. évi CCIII. törvény az országgyűlési képviselők választásáról". Nemzeti Jogszabálytár. Magyar Közlöny Lap- és Könyvkiadó Kft.
- ↑ KSH: "Az országgyűlési egyéni választókerületek adatai". Népszámlálás 2011. Központi Statisztikai Hivatal.
