= János Süli =

Hungarian engineer, businessman and politician

Minister without Portfolio for the planning, construction and commissioning of the two new blocks at Paks Nuclear Power Plant
- In office 2 May 2017 – 24 May 2022
- President: János Áder; Katalin Novák
- Prime Minister: Viktor Orbán

Mayor of Paks
- In office 12 October 2014 – 31 May 2017
- Preceded by: János Hajdú
- Succeeded by: Péter Szabó

Personal details
- Born: 26 January 1956 (age 70) Békéscsaba, Hungary
- Party: KDNP
- Spouse: Edit Süli-Goda
- Children: Anikó; Balázs
- Profession: Electrical engineer

János Süli (born 26 January 1956), is a Hungarian electrical engineer, business executive and politician. He was CEO of the Paks Nuclear Power Plant from 2009 to 2010, and the mayor of Paks from 2014 to 2017. In May 2017, he was appointed Minister without Portfolio in the Third Orbán Government, responsible for the planning, construction and commissioning of the two new blocks at Paks Nuclear Power Plant. He is also chairman of the Paksi FC and president of the Tolna County branch of the Hungarian Football Federation (MLSZ).

== Professional career ==
Süli raised in Újkígyós, Békés County, where his father, János Süli, Sr. (born 1934) worked as a teacher, then was chairman of the local council (tanácselnök) between 1973 and 1990. His mother was Izabella Marosffy. He finished his secondary studies at the Pollák Antal Secondary School of Electrical Engineering in Szentes. He graduated from the Faculty of Electrical Engineering of the Budapest University of Technology (BME) in 1980, specializing in the electrical industry.

He worked for the Nuclear Power Plant Project Co. (Erőmű Beruházási Vállalat – ERBE) since that year, which was responsible for the construction of the Paks Nuclear Power Plant, of which Süli became employee in 1985 as an installation group leader. In 1986, he was head of the nuclear power plant's Electrical Operations Department, in this capacity until 2000, when he was appointed Head of Electrical Management and Operations Department. Since 2001, he led the Operations Department, directing the work of the Reactor Department, the Turbine Department, the Operations Management Department and the Electrical Operations Department. On 15 January 2004, he was made Technical Director of the Paks Nuclear Power Plant. After a year, he was appointed Operations Director on 15 January 2005. Süli was appointed chief executive officer (CEO) of the Paks Nuclear Power Plant on 24 March 2009, replacing József Kovács, who held the position since 12 January 2005. Süli held his post during the government of Prime Minister Gordon Bajnai. After the 2010 parliamentary election, he was dismissed and was demoted to the office of Deputy CEO, working in this capacity until 2011, when he left the state-owned company after thirty years. Turning to the private sector, he was managing director of the EMI-DUNA Energy Design Office Ltd. between 2011 and 2014, also based in Paks.

== Political career ==
Süli was involved in the Fidesz-ally Smallholders' Civil Association (KPE) and led its Madocsa branch. Despite his replacement as CEO of the Paks Nuclear Power Plant in September 2010, Süli is considered as a right-wing, conservative-minded provincialist, who had extensive ties with the local branch of the Fidesz. The left-wing Népszabadság noted the dismissal of Süli as CEO was because of "some energetic lobby interests", despite that Süli, before the nomination, asked for the opinion of Fidesz leader Viktor Orbán, whose victory was unquestionable in the next parliamentary election in 2010. Nevertheless, Prime Minister Viktor Orbán still maintained his trust in favour of Süli. After János Hajdú, the mayor of Paks since 2002 announced in May 2014 that does not want to run in the upcoming municipality local elections, the local branch of the Fidesz and the Christian Democratic People's Party (KDNP) intended to nominate Süli as their candidate. However the national leadership of the governing party announced in the next month that they chose György Kozmann, a former Olympic sprint canoeist as their candidate. Following that Süli established the Civic Unity for Paks and became its candidate for the mayoral position. Several members of the local Fidesz and KDNP branches joined to his initiative. The Paks sections of the Hungarian Socialist Party (MSZP) and the Democratic Coalition (DK) also expressed their support to Süli, who was elected as mayor, officially as candidate of the People's Party (NP), with 77.8 percent of the vote, over Fidesz–KDNP-candidate György Kozmann.

Prime Minister Viktor Orbán announced at a parliamentary plenary session on 10 April 2017 that he had appointed János Süli as minister without portfolio in his third cabinet, responsible for the planning, construction and commissioning of the two new blocks at Paks Nuclear Power Plant. Süli accepted a nomination and said he wants to keep Attila Aszódi, the Government Commissioner for the project in his staff. According to the opposition Népszava, Süli, who was CEO during the Socialist Bajnai Cabinet, was a good choice for Orbán to discredit the Socialist Party's communication attacks against the controversial investment. Süli took the ministerial oath on 2 May, while also resigned as mayor of Paks. Süli told during his inaugural press conference on 8 May that the nuclear power plant will be complete for the deadline of 2026. He said his main task has to prepare the Hungarian companies to be a good supplier to the Russian constructor. Süli hoped the construction will provide work for 8-10 thousands of people in the coming years. In June 2017, Süli dismissed and replaced the majority of the Paks2 project company's management.

János Süli was appointed as individual MP candidate of the governing coalition Fidesz–KDNP for Tolna County Constituency III (Paks) during the 2018 parliamentary election, replacing incumbent Fidesz parliamentarian Ferenc Hirt. He obtained the mandate and joined the KDNP parliamentary group. He retained his position of minister without portfolio in the Fourth Orbán Government too.

Süli was re-elected MP for Paks (Tolna County 3rd constituency) in the 2022 parliamentary election. His portfolio for the construction of the Paks Nuclear Power Plant was subordinated to the Ministry of Foreign Affairs and Trade in the Fifth Orbán Government. Süli remained responsible for the task as secretary of state within the ministry under minister Péter Szijjártó. Süli resigned from his position on 5 September 2022, after Szijjártó criticized the slow progress of the expansion investment of the Paks nuclear power plant.
