= Tamás Cseh (politician) =

Hungarian politician

Member of the National Assembly
- Incumbent
- Assumed office 9 May 2026
- Preceded by: János Süli
- Constituency: Tolna 3rd

Personal details
- Born: 1973 or 1974 (age 52–53)
- Party: Tisza

Tamás Cseh (born 1973 or 1974) is a Hungarian politician who was elected member of the National Assembly in 2026 representing the Tolna County 3rd constituency. He previously worked as a manager.
