= Surrender at Ozora =

Coordinates: 46°45′58.6″N 18°23′34.7″E

- Part of the Hungarian Revolution of 1848
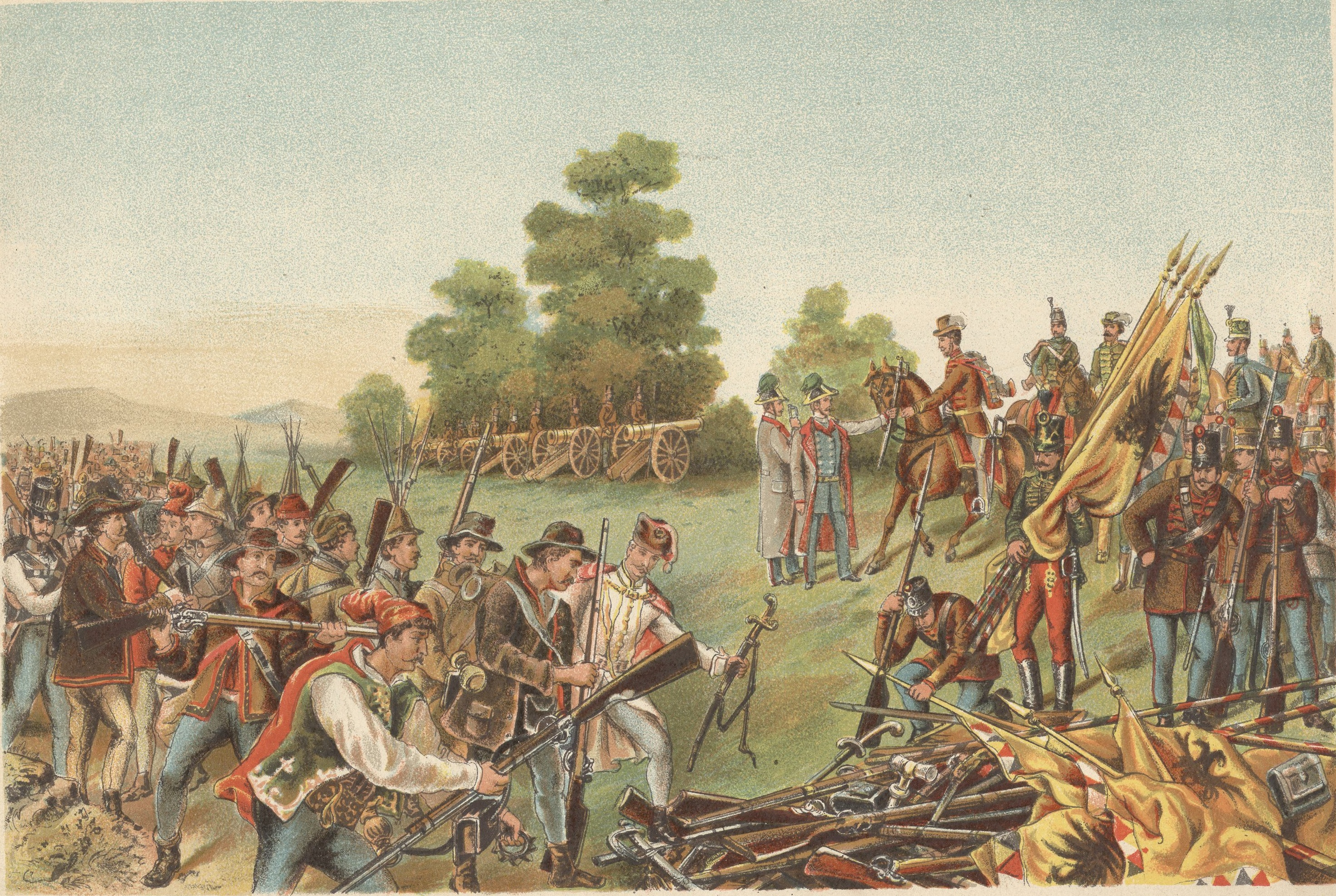
- The Croatian surrender at Ozora by György Gracza
Date	7 October 1848
Location	Ozora, Tolna County, Hungary
Result	Hungarian victory

Belligerents
Hungarian Revolutionary Army	Austrian Empire: Kingdom of Croatia

Commanders and leaders
Mór Perczel; Artúr Görgei	Karl Roth (POW) Nicolaus Philippovich von Philippsberg (POW)

Strength
29,064+? men 12 cannons	≈9,000 men 12 cannons

Casualties and losses
2 dead 5 wounded	11 dead 9,000 prisoners 12 cannons

The Surrender at Ozora, was an important event of the early stage of the Hungarian War of independence of 1848-1849. The 9,000 strong Croatian corps which invaded the Transdanubia region of Hungary, trying to join the Croatian main army led by Lieutenant General Josip Jelačić, which was sent by the Habsburg Empire to chase away the revolutionary government of Hungary, and reimpose the total imperial sovereignty over the country, was forced to surrender by Hungarian regular and insurrectionist forces led by Major Artúr Görgei and Colonel Mór Perczel. Thanks to this the Croatian invasion and the Habsburg plans against Hungary suffered a total defeat.

== Background ==
On 11 September 1848, the Croatian troops sent by the Habsburg Empire to depose the Hungarian revolutionary government led by Lajos Batthyány, crossed the Dráva river. Ten days after the Croatian main army led by Lieutenant General Josip Jelačić crossed at Légrád, another large force led by Karl Roth crossed the river to march eastwards across the Danube towards Pest-Buda. Jelačić initially planned the campaign to join his army with Roth's corps somewhere in the region of Székesfehérvár before reaching the capital, but the favorable start of the campaign, such as: the retreat of the hugely outnumbered Hungarians and the mass desertion of the officers, as well as the changing sides of many military units from the Hungarian to the Croatian side, gave him enough confidence to overconfidently engage in battle with the Hungarian troops led by Lieutenant-General János Móga before the corps of Roth arrived, which ended in the Croatian defeat in the Battle of Pákozd on 29 September. Jelačić, after this defeat, simply abandoned the approaching to his aid reinforcements, and retreated towards Vienna, while Major-General Karl Roth and Nicolaus Philippovich von Philippsberg pushed on northwards, unsuspecting what had happened. The Hungarian general staff, expecting the arrival of the new army corps, even tried to reduce the generals' suspicion, by blocking the routes to the south, and thus also blocking information about the battle of Pákozd to reach them.

After the defeat of Jelačić, the National Defence Commission (the temporary de facto Hungarian government led by Lajos Kossuth), which took office on 2 October and replaced the Batthyány government, saw an opportunity to try forcing the Croatian column to surrender.

== Prelude ==
As seen above, on 21 September, Major General Karl Roth's Slavonian division of about 9,000 men, made up of border guards and poorly equipped Seressaners, entered Hungary at Drávasztára, with the purpose to march through the counties of Baranya and Tolna to join Jelačić's army. However, the march of the Croatian troops was not met with a happy, submissive, or cooperative population, but with active resistance, which caused increasing losses for the Croats. Already after the Croatian invasion, Prime Minister Lajos Batthyány wrote a letter to the főispáns and government commissioners of the Transdanubian counties asking them to hinder the enemy at all costs, to obstruct him, to prevent him from getting food, to encourage the population so that the enemy could not advance finding no help in the Hungarian homeland, in order to make his advance impossible.

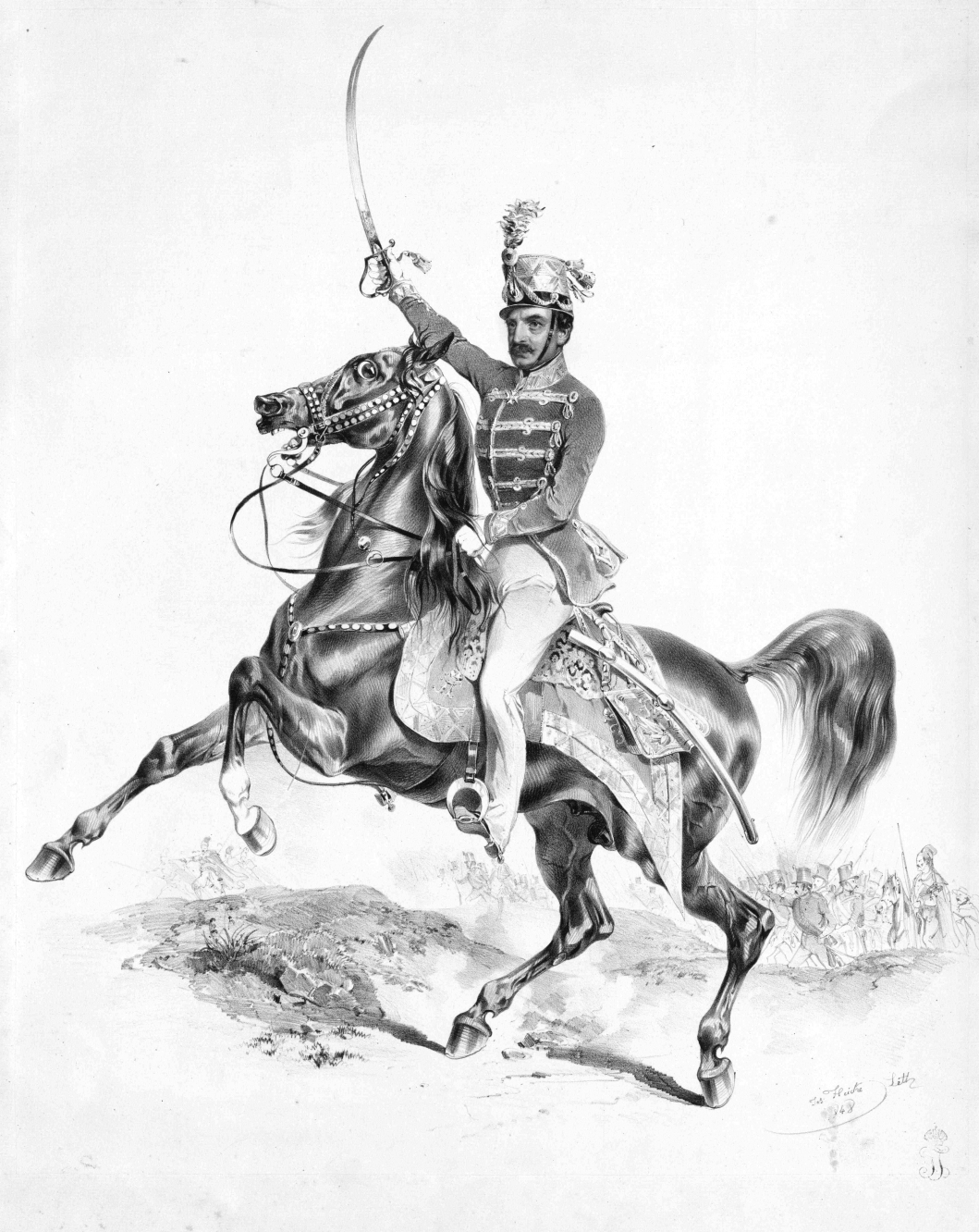
Jellasics lovon2

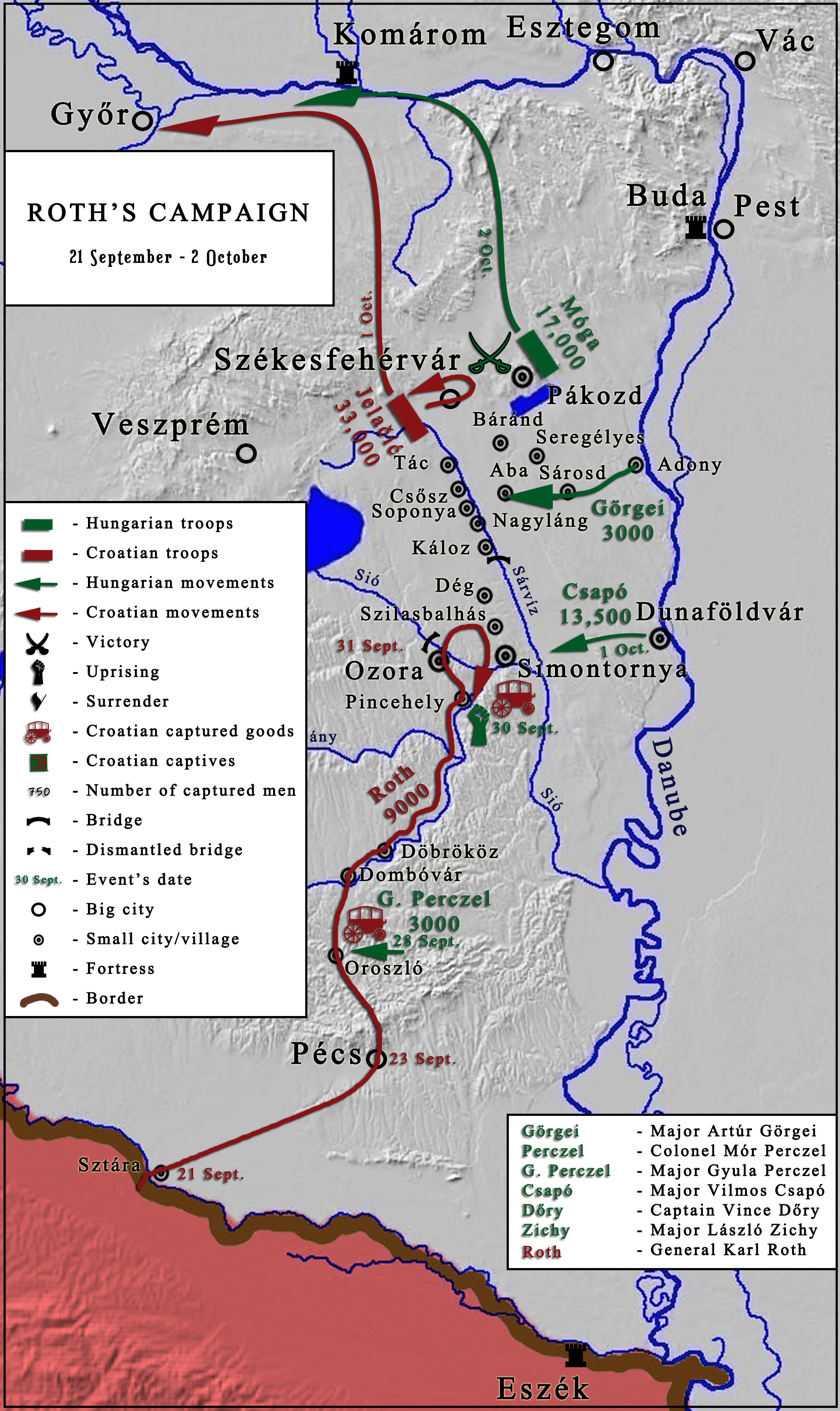
Karl Roth's Croatian corps's march in Hungary between 21 September - 2 October 1848

The call did not fell on deaf ears. The popular uprising against the Croatian invaders, which followed had a decisive influence on the course of events. The Hungarian main force's southern flank was covered by a small detachment. The commander of this detachment was the Honvéd Major Artúr Görgei. Görgei was in command of Csepel Island from 24 September. His task was to prevent Jelačić's possible crossing to the right bank of the Danube, and also to prevent the Roth reserve column from joining up with Jelačić's main force. Görgei gathered his entire army at Adony on the right bank of the Danube and from there he led it to the Sárvíz Canal, towards Soponya, where he set up two outpost lines, one facing north towards Székesfehérvár, the other facing south towards the direction of Roth's advance. Its force of about 3,000 infantry volunteers, two companies of hussars, and 12 guns was insufficient to disrupt the operations of any enemy column, but by isolating them from each other it could do the Hungarian main force a great service. But Görgei was not only the commander of this force. On 25 September, Batthyány placed under his command the National Guard of the Danube Region, and on 26 September also the forces of the popular uprising.

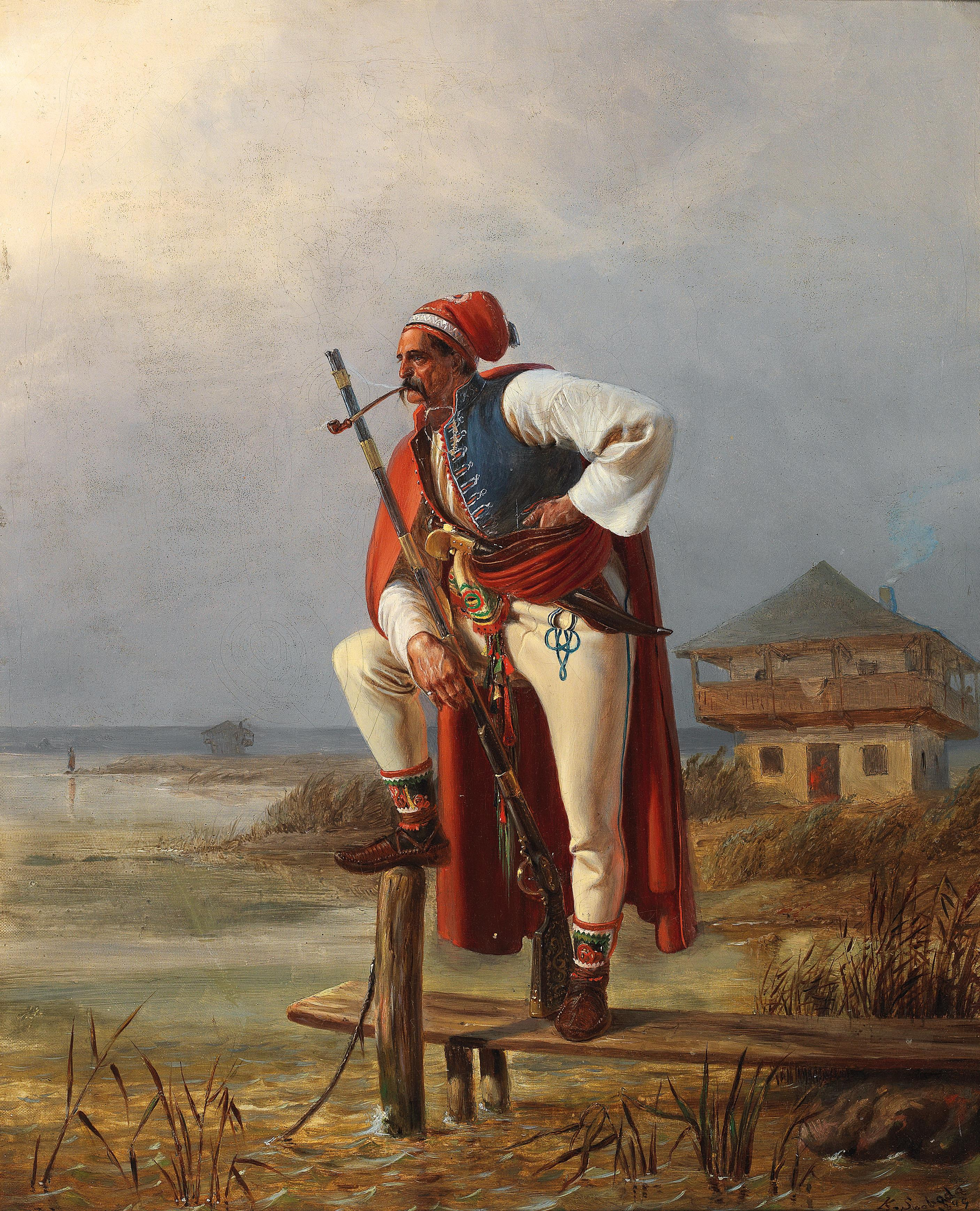
Croatian border guard - Karl Swoboda 1849

On 29 September, at one of the northern outposts sat by Görgei, Jelačić's emissary, Count Ödön Zichy, the former administrator of Fejér County, who had already disgraced himself in this quality by his dubious conduct and cruelties, was captured and detained. Görgei brought Zichy before the court, which sentenced the Count to death by hanging, on the basis of the documents found in his possession, which were from Jelačić, addressed to General Roth, and other suspicious contents, as an accomplice of the enemies of Hungary and as a spreader of illegal manifests against the Hungarian nation and its freedom. Zichy was hanged the next day on 30 September in Lórév. This uncompromising, ruthless act of Görgei caused a great stir throughout the country, and from this time onwards the reputation and popularity of the heavy-handed Honvéd major of the army rose day by day, and Kossuth also took notice of him.

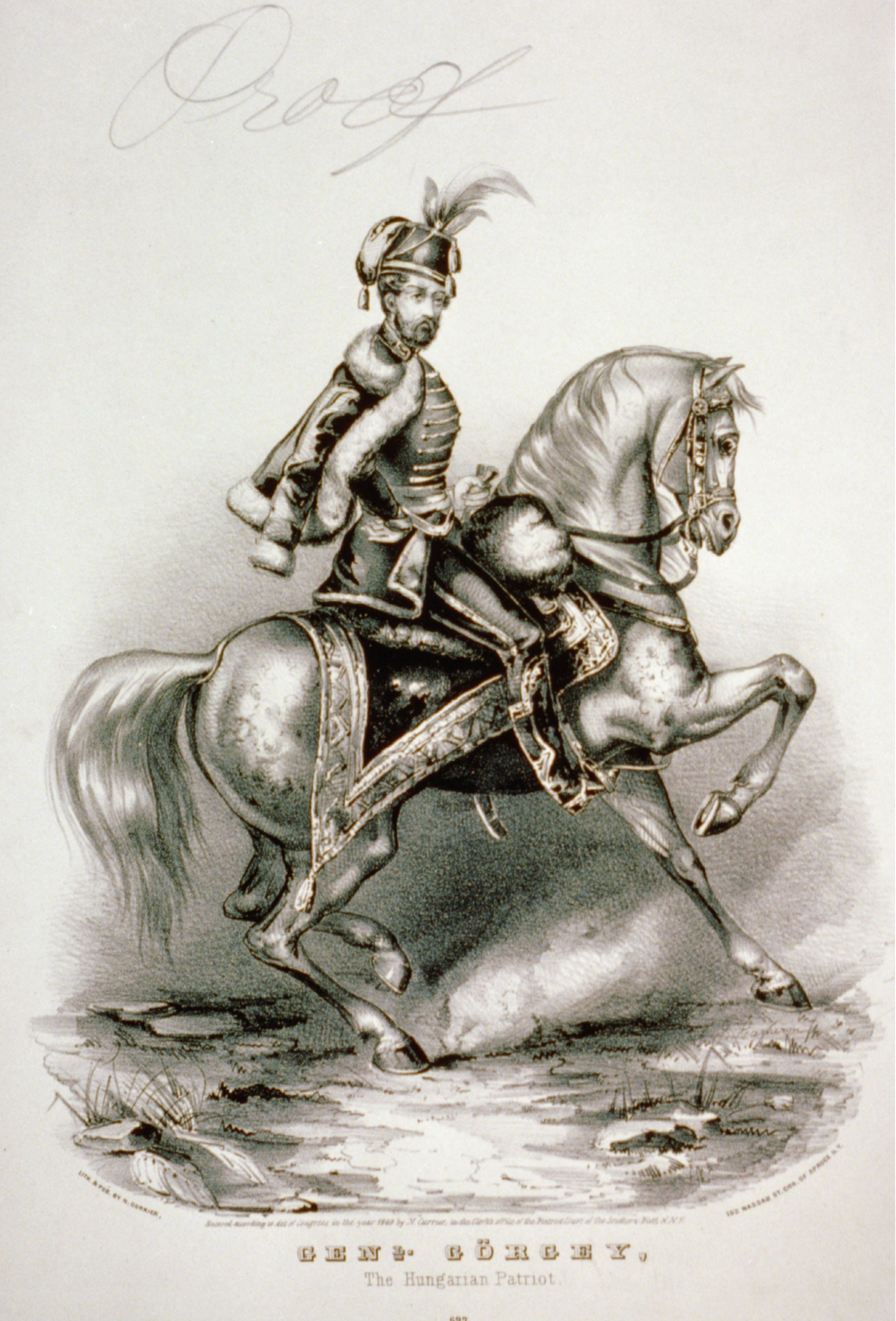
Artúr Görgei

Meanwhile, Görgei received reinforcements. On 3 October, Lieutenant-General Móga sent the Zrínyi Militia to his support, whose leader, Colonel Mór Perczel, was named main commander of the operations against Roth. The roads and bridges leading into Tolna County were blocked from the south by the national guards of Major Vilmos Csapó. On 4 October, Perczel, in order to cut off the advance of Roth, who was approaching Székesfehérvár, marched from Adony to Seregélyes with the Zrínyi, Hunyadi and Szabolcs rookie battalions, the Kecskemét and Kunság National Guards and some Hussars, a total of about 3000 infantry, 200 cavalry and 8 cannons. Another mass of the insurgents with 2 companies of the Hunyadi irregulars was directed to Aba via Sárosd as a left column.

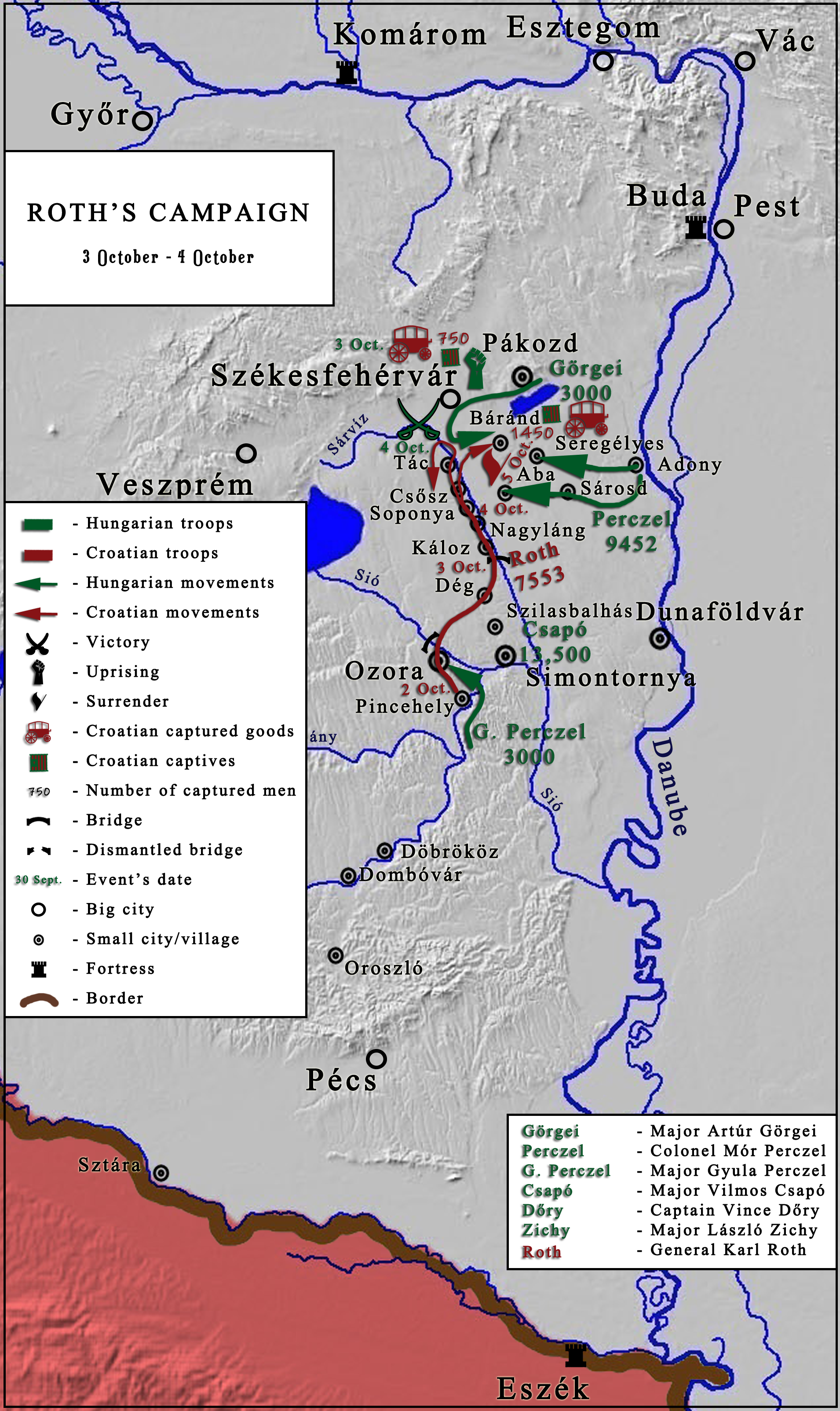
Karl Roth's Croatian corps's march in Hungary between 3 - 4 October 1848

In the meantime, Roth's division occupied unopposed Pécs on 23 September and left it on 25 September. But after that, the raids and actions in Baranya county constantly disrupted and delayed its movements. On 28 September, the National Guards of Baranya led by Major Gyula Perczel intercepted and captured his ammunition convoy at Oroszló. On the same day, Roth's troops entered Tolna County and moved north along the Dombóvár - Döbrököz - Pincehely line. On 30 September the vanguard was already stationed in Dég, and the next day the main column reached Ozora's vicinity. On the same day national guardsmen and popular insurrectionists from the area disarmed the guardians of Roth's arriving baggage wagons and took the wagons away. Soon the other half of the baggage and the convoy with the wounded soldiers arrived. The locals then attacked and captured this transport as well, beating the guards and wounded soldiers to death. On hearing this, Roth turned back to seek revenge. He demanded twenty-four oxen, six thousand sheep, three hundred gallons of wine and two thousand forints indemnity from the inhabitants of Pincehely. Then he commanded the bridge over the Kapos river to be dismantled, then ordered the cannonade and the burning of the village. According to the descriptions, he was terribly cruel. Because of this, he reached Székesfehérvár - the town whose inhabitants had disarmed the Croatian garrison the previous day - only in the morning of 4 October.

When Jelačić marched from Székesfehérvár to Győr, he left about 1500 regular border guards in the aforementioned city to guard those soldiers who were wounded in the battle of Pákozd, and a large number of food supplies of his army until Roth arrived. Early in the morning of October 3, the citizens of the town, who were previously disarmed by the Croatians, armed with household and economic tools, surprisingly attacked the detachment guarding the warehouses, then, led by Captain Peterdi, stormed the 750-strong troop camped outside the town, and finally the Croatian detachment that was plundering the area, the latter being disarmed and sent to the capital. The people of Székesfehérvár thus recovered not only their hunting weapons but also a lot of spoils of war, including 1,500 bayonet rifles, a whole pile of pistols and scimitars, 2,500 hundredweight of flour, 600 measures of oats and nearly 60,000 cartridges.

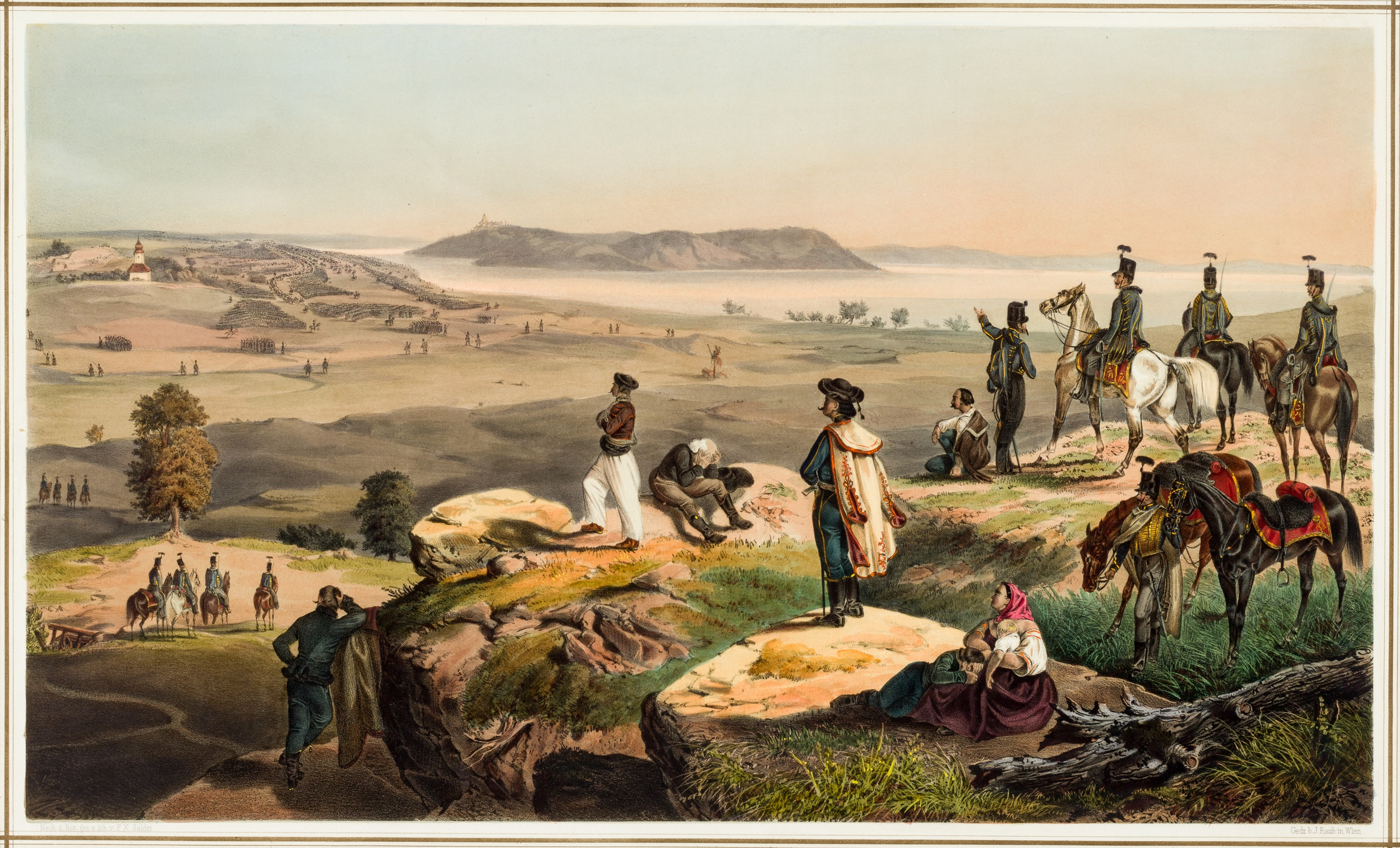
The Croatian army marching near the lake Balaton towards Székesfehérvár by Franz Xaver Zalder

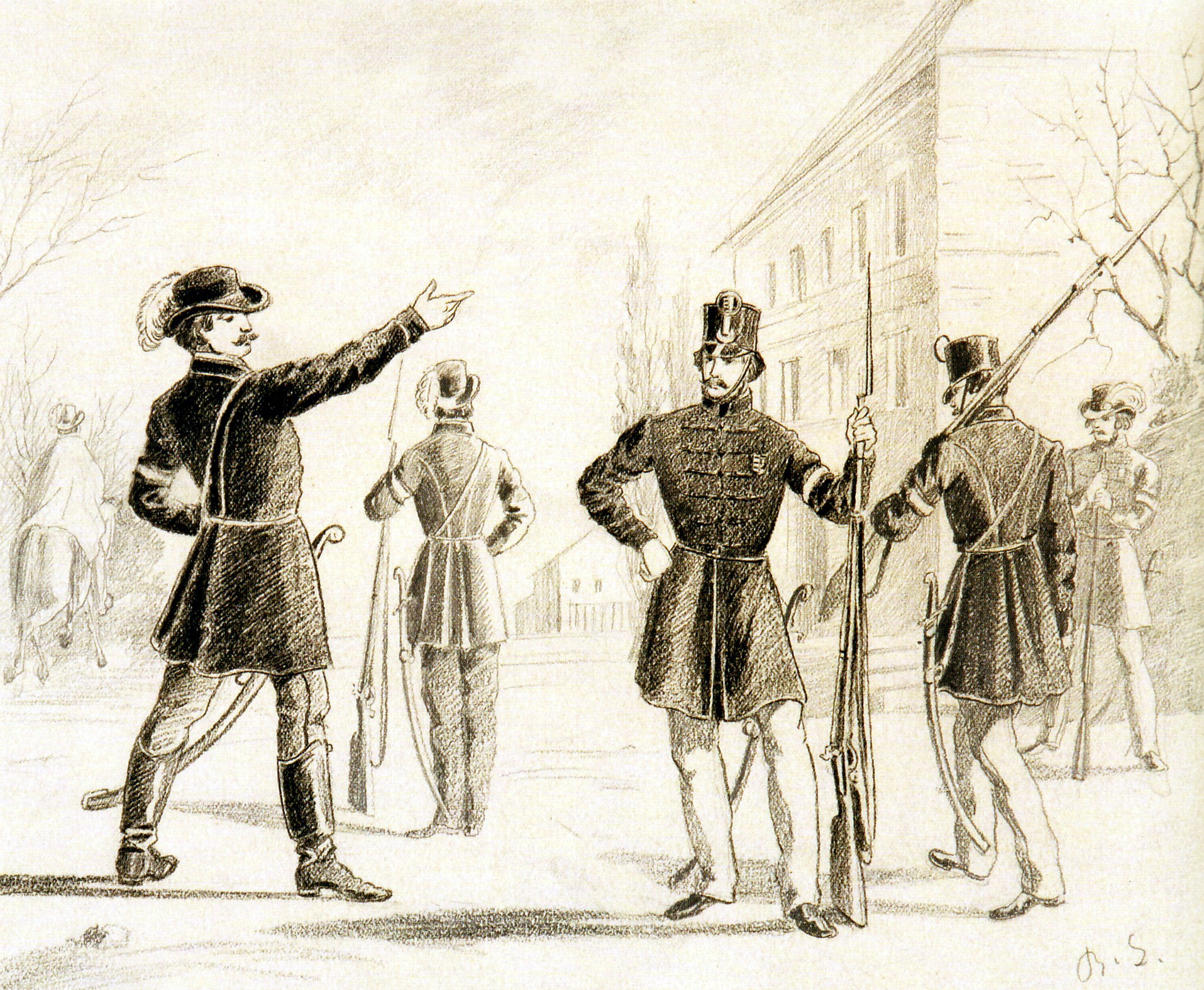
Hungarian national guards Bellony

Roth reached Ozora on 2 October and Káloz on 3 October. One of his battalions occupied Tác, and two Soponya. If Roth had not spent his time at Pincehely with petty revenge, he could have arrived in Székesfehérvár on 3 October. In that case, the inhabitants of the town would hardly have rebelled, and the Croatian division, united with the garrison, would have been able to follow the retreating Jelačić unhindered. As a result of the fact that, as mentioned above, the Hungarian commanders, with the help of the popular uprising, national guards and hussars, by intercepting the messengers and transports, cut off all communication between Roth's army and the outside world, the Croatian forces only realised on 4 October that Josip Jelačić's main army had been defeated and had retreated westwards, leaving them to their fate. Roth and Philippovich, having been informed of Jelačić's failure, did not think for a moment of taking the battle against the Hungarians, and decided to retreat on the same day. Jelačić, defeated at Pákozd on 29 September, chose the route to Vienna because the Hungarian uprising in his rear made it very hard for him to return to Croatia. This was also the case for Roth and Philippovich, but they had no alternative to escape; they could not go west because the Hungarian main army was in their way, so the two major generals had to lead their army home by the same route they had taken to Székesfehérvár.

=== Opposing forces ===
The Hungarians:

Army section	Unit	Horse	Cannon	Number
Görgei's troops Commander: Major Artúr Görgei	Hunyadi irregulars	-	-	1,520
Görgei's troops Commander: Major Artúr Görgei	Volunteer Mobile National Guard Battalion from Szabolcs County	-	-	680
Görgei's troops Commander: Major Artúr Görgei	Volunteer Mobile National Guard Battalion of Jászkunság	-	-	600
Görgei's troops Commander: Major Artúr Görgei	2. Major squadron of the 9. Hussar Regiment	160	-	160
Görgei's troops Commander: Major Artúr Görgei	a Honvéd battery	-	8	144
Görgei's troops Commander: Major Artúr Görgei	Görgei's battery	?	4	?
Görgei's troops Commander: Major Artúr Görgei	Total	160 + ?	12	3,112 + ?
Perczel's troops Commander: Colonel Mór Perczel	Zrínyi troop	-	-	950
Perczel's troops Commander: Colonel Mór Perczel	Aula of Vienna	-	-	120
Perczel's troops Commander: Colonel Mór Perczel	National Guards from Nagykőrös	-	-	1,082
Perczel's troops Commander: Colonel Mór Perczel	National Guards from Kunság	-	-	?
Perczel's troops Commander: Colonel Mór Perczel	National Guards from Kecskemét	-	-	7,300
Perczel's troops Commander: Colonel Mór Perczel	Total	-	-	9452 + ?
Csapó's troops Commander: Major Vilmos Csapó	Csapó's battalion	-	-	3,000
Csapó's troops Commander: Major Vilmos Csapó	István Perczel's battalion	-	-	1,500
Csapó's troops Commander: Major Vilmos Csapó	Gyula Perczel's battalion	-	-	3,000
Csapó's troops Commander: Major Vilmos Csapó	Ferenc Szeniczey's battalion	-	-	3,000
Csapó's troops Commander: Major Vilmos Csapó	Vince Dőry's battalion	-	-	3,000
Csapó's troops Commander: Major Vilmos Csapó	Count László Zichy's's battalion	-	-	3,000
Csapó's troops Commander: Major Vilmos Csapó	Total	-	-	16,500
Army total		160 + ?	12	29,064 + ?

Roth's Croatian corps:

Roth's corps consisted of two brigades. The first was the Philippovich brigade led by Major General Nicolaus Philippovich von Philippsberg. It consisted of the 3. and 4. battalions of the 8. (Gradiška) border guard regiment, the 5. battalion of the 7. (Brod) border guard regiment, 28 horses, and a battery of 6 guns having 4,500 soldiers. The second brigade was the Roth brigade led by Major General Karl Roth. It consisted of the 3. and 4. battalions of the 7. (Brod) border guard regiment, the 5. battalion of the 8. (Gradiška) border guard regiment, 28 horses, and a battery of 6 guns having 4,500 soldiers. Thus Roth had in total 9,000 soldiers, 56 horses for the traction of supply and ammunition wagons, and cannons, and 12 cannons.

== The road (back) to Ozora ==
The fact that on 4 October, Görgei's hussars ambushed his former vanguard, the most valuable part of the division, at Tác, forcing the Croats to flee, played a major role in Roth's and Philippovich's decision. The next morning, however, Görgei did not follow the fleeing Croats, because he returned to the main troop, believing that there was a stronger enemy in Székesfehérvár, which could easily cut him off from Perczel.

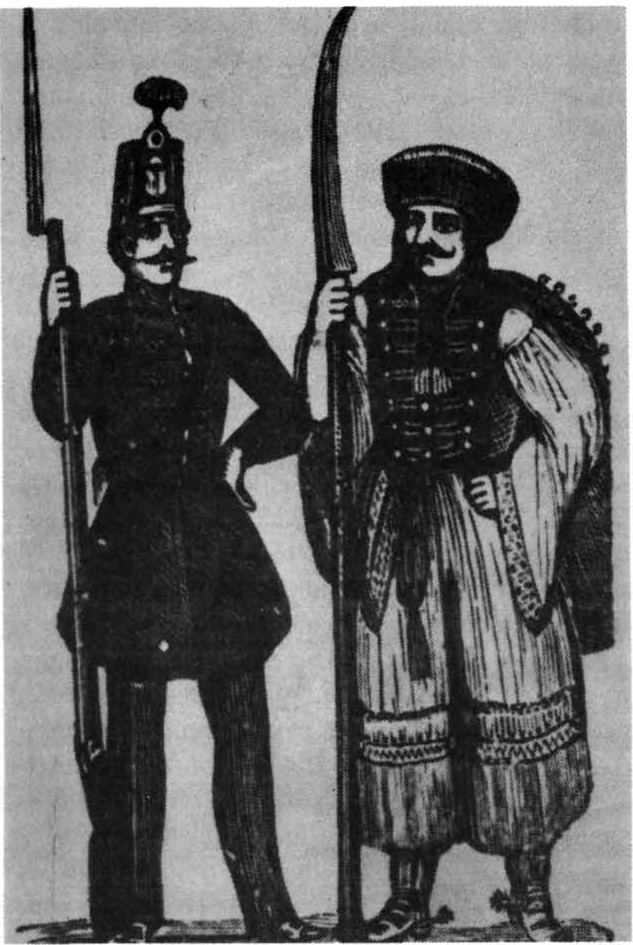
Hungarian national guardsman and insurrectionist in 1848 - unknown author

At this time he learned of the events from Székesfehérvár, which prompted Görgei to attack again the Croatian detachment of about 1,000 men, mostly belonging to the Brod battalion, which had advanced to Báránd (5 km northwest of Seregélyes) and formed Roth's vanguard. Its commander, after Perczel had soon appeared on the horizon with his army from the direction of Seregélyes, entered into negotiations with Görgei, the result of which was that Roth's vanguard surrendered unconditionally. While this was happening, Roth stood with his main troops at Soponya and made no attempt to rush to the aid of his advance guard. Roth was in increasing trouble. In addition to the impossibility to reach Jelačić's army, the loss of contact with the hinterland, thus the complete lack of supplies, and the increasingly effective actions of the popular insurgents from Tolna, who took up arms against his troops, were just as big a problem.

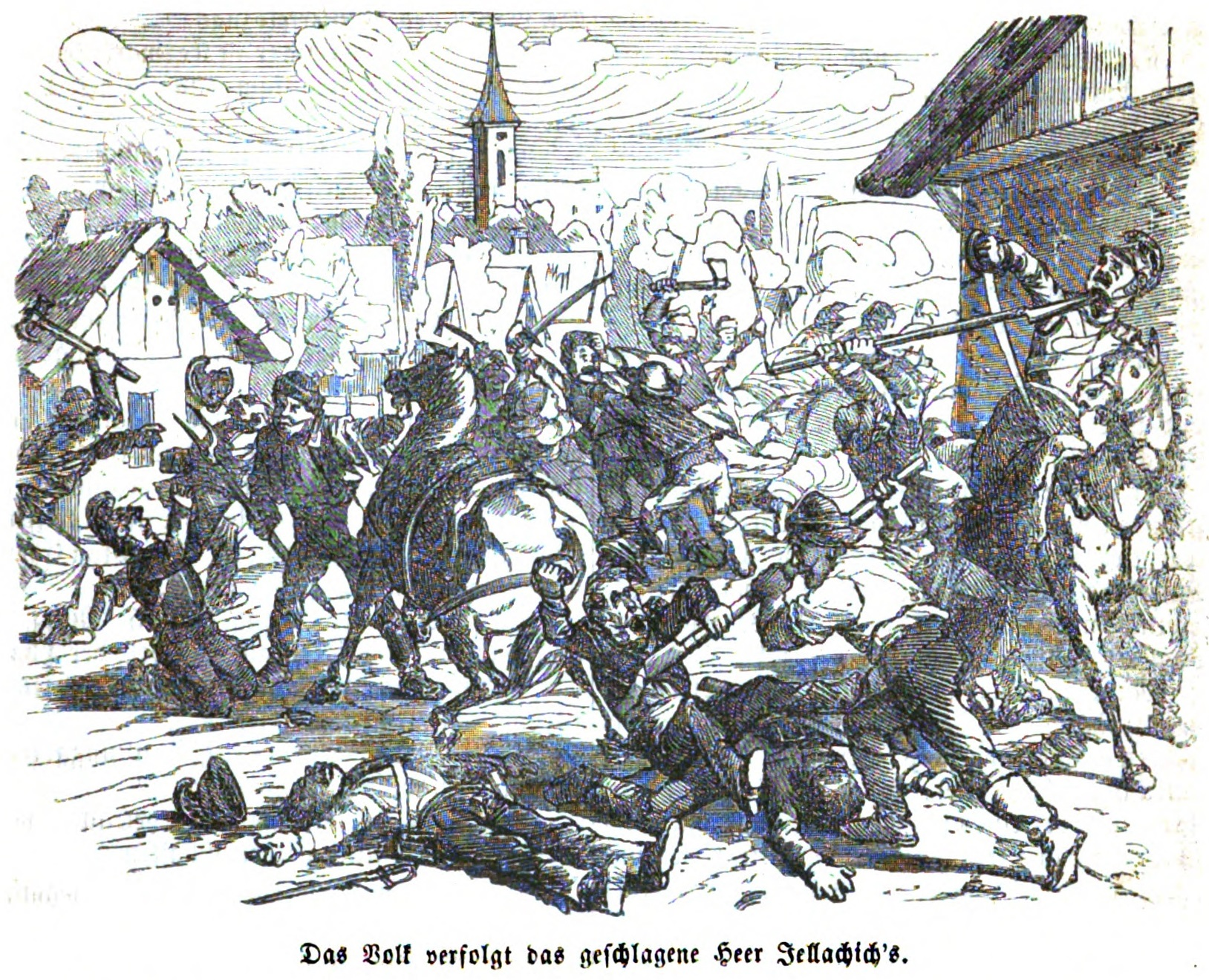
The Hungarian villagers attack the troops of Jelačić - German caricature

On 1 October, Vilmos Csapó received orders from Perczel to prevent General Roth from crossing the Sió river. Csapó left immediately from Dunaföldvár and on 3 October he sent a messenger from Simontornya to say that a battle was expected at Ozora on 4 October. However, it was questionable whether the Croatian division could be surrounded. With 7553 men and 12 guns, it was still a considerable force, even if it was not made up of first-class troops. On 5 October, Vilmos Csapó marched towards Káloz and Dég with three thousand men. István Perczel waited at Szilas with 1,500 insurgents, and when the enemy approached, Vilmos Csapó ordered István Perczel to hold Dég. Captain Vince Dőry, with a similar number of men, was stationed in Simontornya in the rear of the enemy. At the same time, Gyula Perczel, chief royal servant, later captain of the National Guard, remained in Ozora to thwart any attempt by the enemy to cross the Sió river. A serious obstacle to the movement of Roth's troops was the destruction of the Sió-bridges by the Somogy-Tolna units under the command of Major Zichy. Roth lost a whole night building a crossing on the Sárvíz. On 5 October Perczel's headquarters were in Tác, where he was visited by Major General Philippovich, Roth's deputy. Philippovich demanded a free passing, but Perczel demanded unconditional surrender. The negotiations were unsuccessful, and the Croatian column, leaving its camp from Soponya under cover of night, attempted to slip out of the encirclement towards Ozora, heading south along the Soponya - Nagyláng (today is part of Soponya) - Káloz - Dég route. Roth's troops reached Káloz on the night of 5 October. But the Hungarians followed it and advanced as far as Csősz on the afternoon of the 5th. In the meantime, the insurgents of Káloz, led by Vilmos Csapó, dismantled the bridge leading to the village, and a handful of their armed men opened fire on the Croatian advance guard.

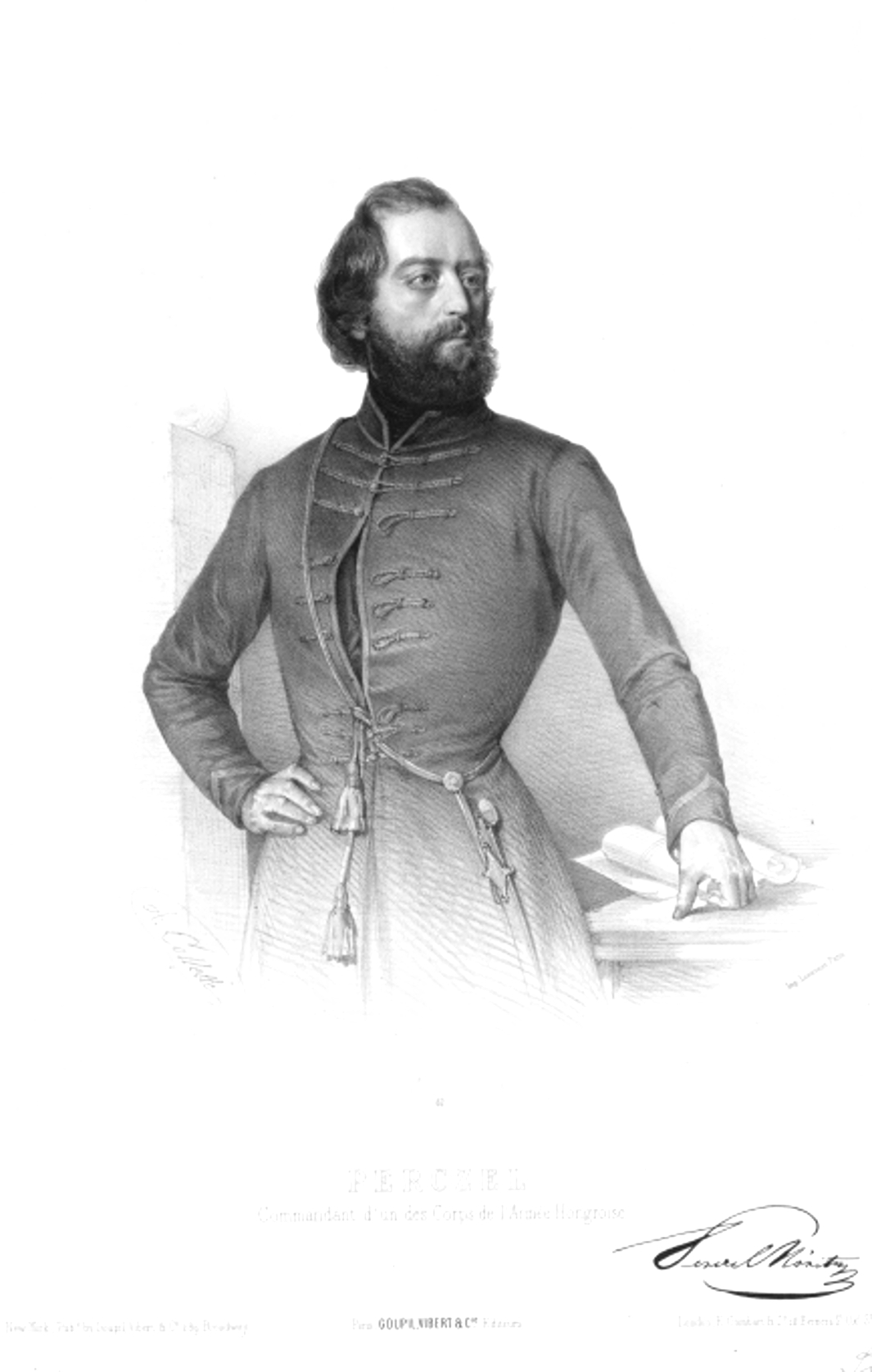
Perczel Mór 1848

The Croats, who had stopped at the dismantled bridge over Sárvíz, also fired back, but they couldn't hit any Hungarian. The Hungarians responded from the other bank, making so much noise that Roth's troops were frightened and retreated. Six Croats were wounded in the overnight shooting. According to the Hungarian gazette, Közlöny, the cunning and courage of one man [Csapó] kept the enemy from escaping by one night.

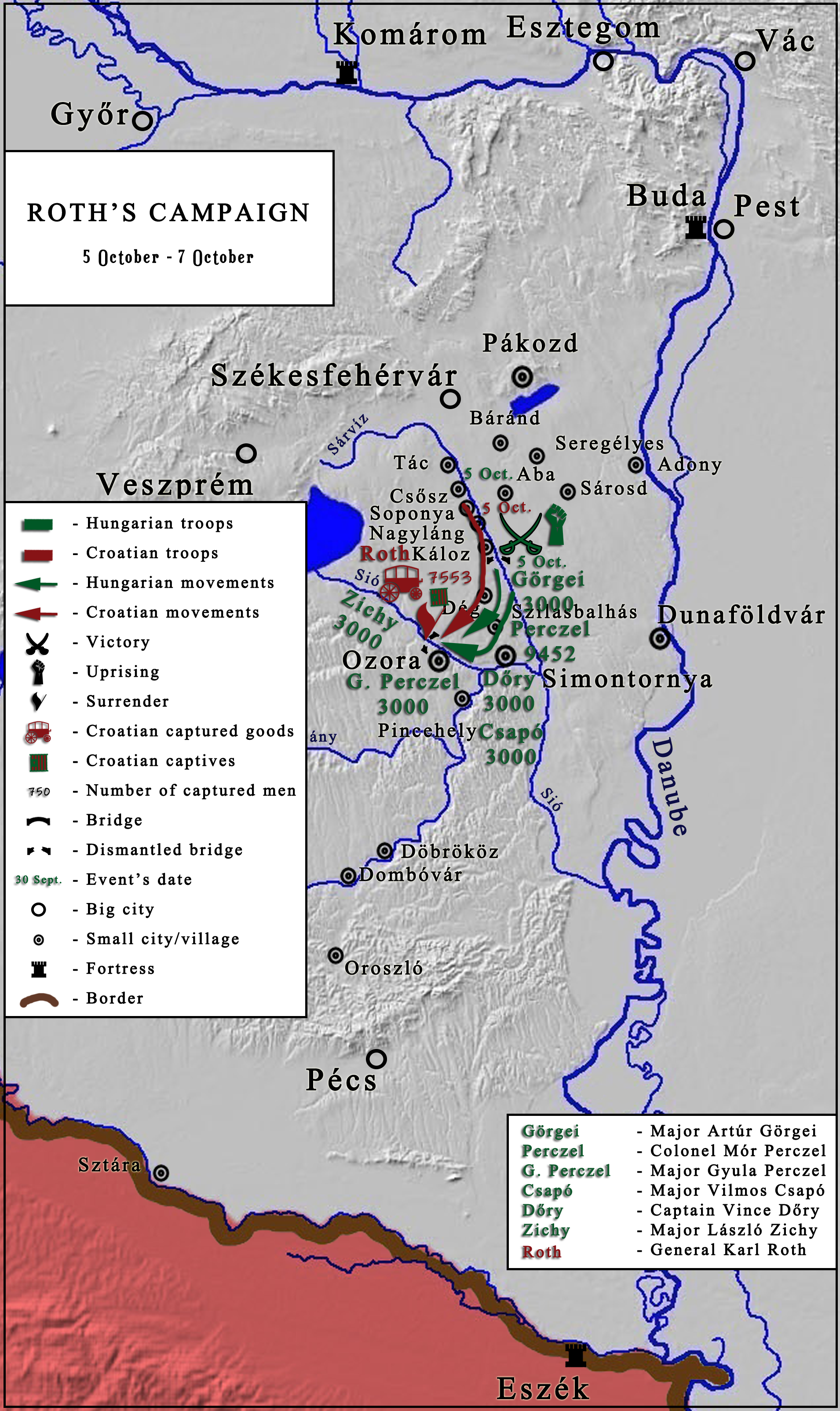
Karl Roth's Croatian corps's march in Hungary between 5 - 7 October 1848

At 7 am. the next morning, Roth's troops entered Káloz and then rushed towards Dég. Görgei followed Roth's column with the cavalry and caught up with him at noon on 6 October, but feeling that the troops at his disposition are not enough, he did not dare to attack. Yet there was still a chance that Roth and Philipovich's army would escape. Surrounding the "imperial" army was made more difficult by the difficulties of cooperation between the two Hungarian leaders'. The brave, fiery, but militarily untrained Perczel and the ice-cold mannered, but very talented former hussar Görgei did not get along. Here, Perczel and Görgei had a serious quarrel, because Görgei had sent, on a detour route, the cavalry and artillery from Dég to Ozora via Szilasbalhás to surround the Croatian division, a move disapproved by Perczel, because of which in a letter to the National Defence Commission Görgei criticized in a harsh manner Perczel's commanding abilities. At first Perczel wanted to shoot Görgei in the head, but then, after hearing the opinions of the participants in the impromptu council of war, he calmed down and accepted Görgei's plan for an encirclement operation. After the council of war, Görgei set off with the remaining cavalry and some infantry to reinforce the encircling column.

Following the route recommended by Görgei, Perczel led the infantry on a shortcut from Csősz, leaving Káloz on the left, from Nagyláng to Dég. Although Görgei informed Perczel on the way that the dirt road might not be passable, Perczel allegedly did not listened the warning. Because of the rejection of Görgei's proposals, Perczel's troops were practically left behind by the retreating Croats. Fortunately, Major Vilmos Csapó's national guardsmen from Tolna were alert and occupied the bank of the Sió river before the Croats approached their county. In the meantime, Görgei was tracking the enemy with a company of Miklós hussars. The aim was to force Roth's troops to a permanent halt. Görgei achieved this by on the undulating terrain, as soon as the formations of the mounds allowed, he deployed a platoon of Hussars to the right and left of the road, sometimes at the middle of the enemy, sometimes against his flanks, while some hussars, covered [by the mounds], advanced far forward, and appeared from behind a hill on either side, and our only trumpeter sounded here and there, writes Artúr Görgei's brother, István, in his memoirs. Captain András Gáspár was an excellent director of this performance. After the Croatian army reached the forest between Dég and Ozora, Görgei did not continue to pursue the enemy, who had reach a covered position, but returned to Dég.

== The surrender ==
Roth's army reached the crossing of the Sió Canal at Ozora on 6 October. But here it could not cross it. Roth's forces spent the night of 6–7 October on the banks of the river.

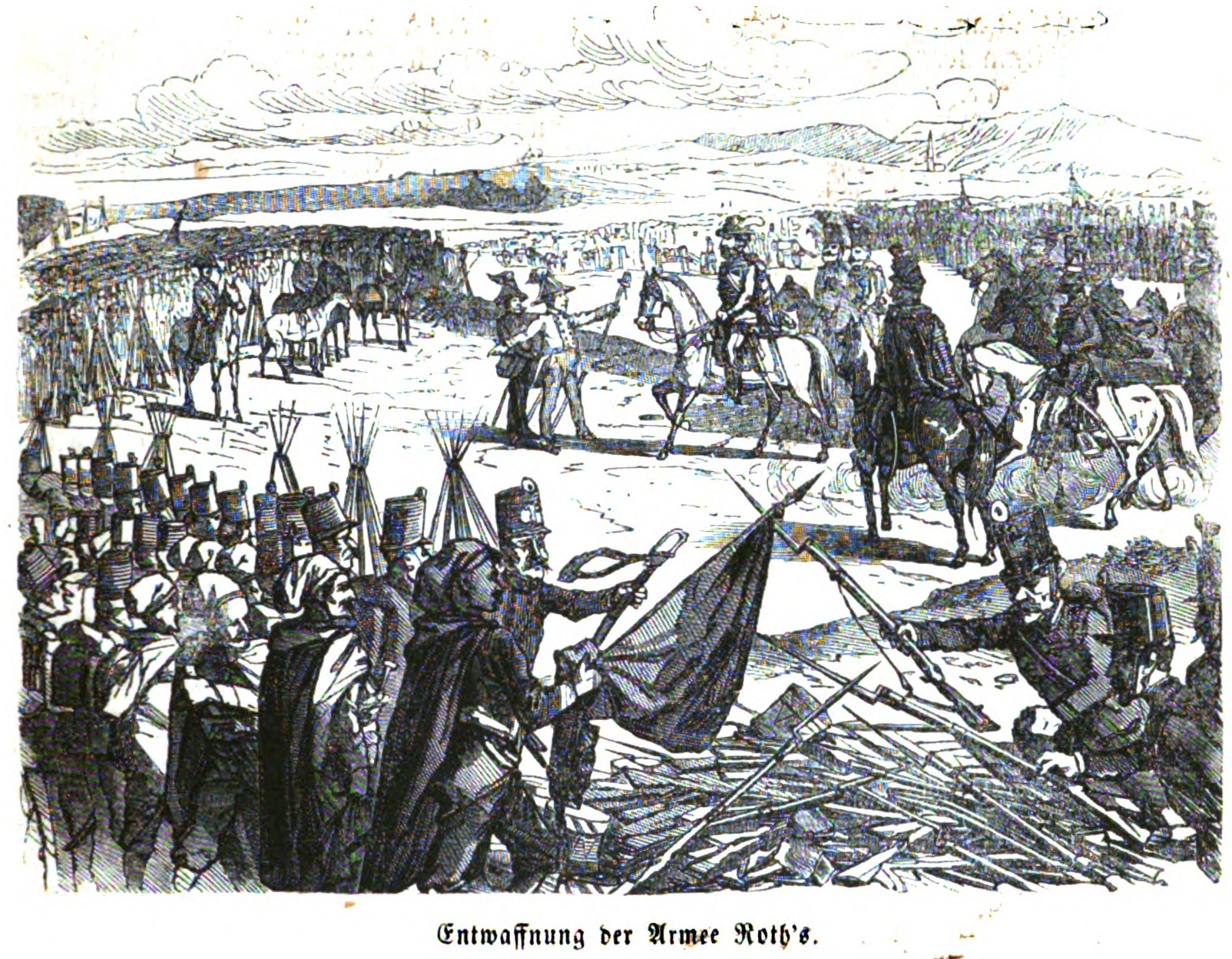
The surrender of Roth's army at Ozora

On the morning of 7 October, Major Vilmos Csapó appeared on the other side of the Sió river and its bridge with the Tolna County National Guard and the insurgent forces, with more than 10,000 men.

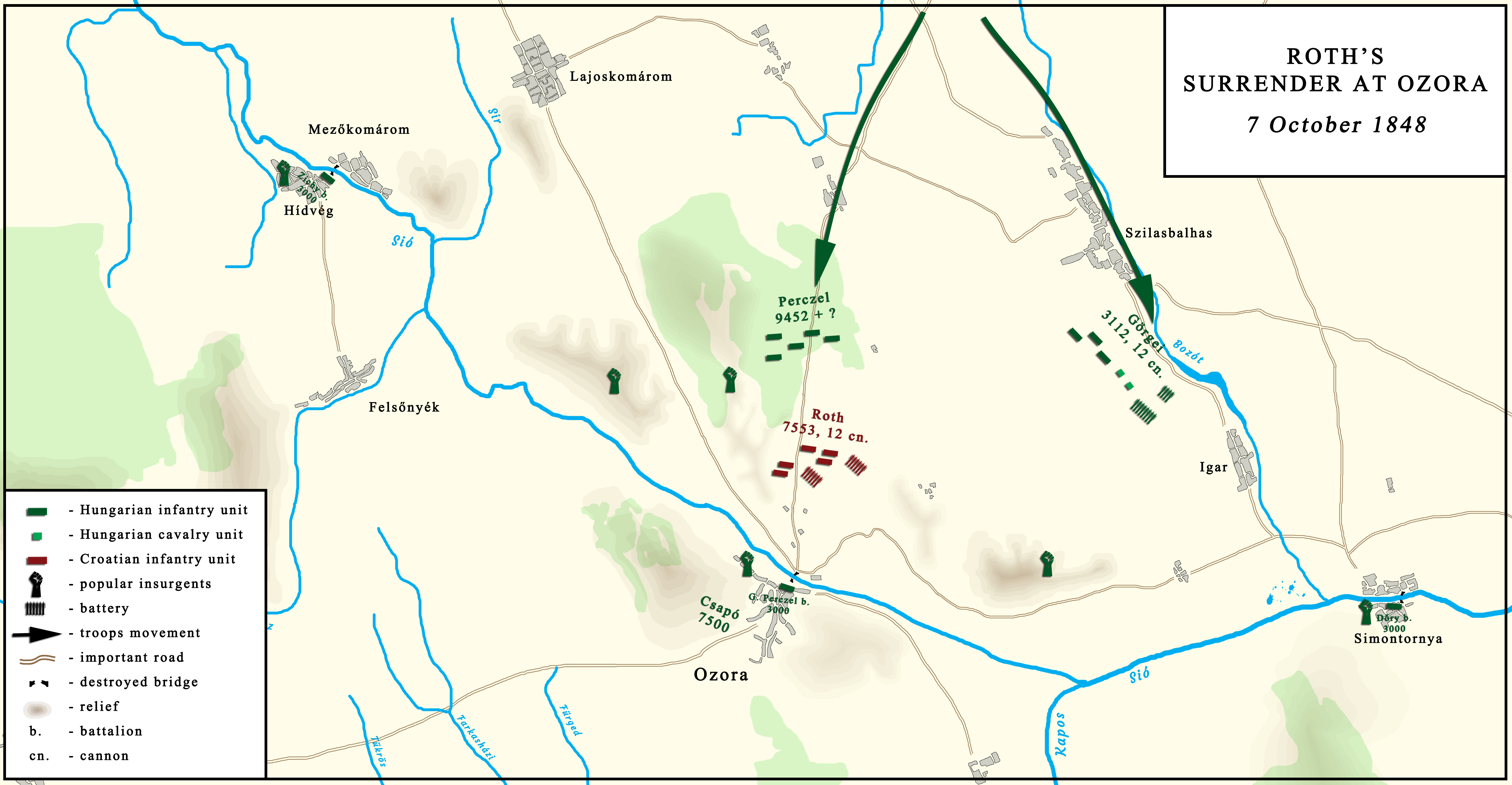
Roth's corps's surrender at Ozora on 7 October 1848

The situation for the Croats was further complicated by a second day of torrential rain. With a drenched, hungry, thirsty, tired, and demoralized army, attempting to break through seemed a suicidal endeavor. The nightly campfires of the National Guard troops surrounding the Croats only hastened the final decision. The national insurgence, which was extremely active in the countryside, had destroyed all the nearby bridges and flooded the hills around Ozora on the left bank of the river by the thousands so that the Croats felt themselves to be in an unbreakable trap. On the morning of October 7, Perczel, with the bulk of his troops advanced from Dég to Ozora through the forest between the two villages, while Görgei, with a strong column, turned left and, joining with the insurgents from there, attacked from the northeast against Roth's army, which was stuck at Ozora; while Perczel's forces also began to spread out on the southern edge of the forest north of Ozora, convincing the imperial general that he could no longer resist the Hungarians surrounding him with his tired and depressed troops.

Roth saw that his situation was hopeless, and on the next day, 7 October, pressed by the Tolna County National Guard and the pursuing troops of Görgei and Perczel, he was forced to unconditionally lay down his arms in front of Ozora.

== Aftermath ==
This was one of the most significant Hungarian victories of the War of Independence. At Báránd and Ozora, an army of more than 9,000, including two generals, three high officers, and 50 other officers, surrendered, and the same number of firearms, 12 guns, their ammunition, and 5 flags were captured. Mór Perczel allowed the officers to keep their swords, but he took them away from the two generals, Roth and Philippovich because he had declared them guilty of the sinful attack on the Hungarian nation and country. He had the officers transported to Pest, while a part of the captured troops was escorted to the border, and after making them swear not to fight against the Hungarian nation, he let them turn back in Croatia. I consider a moral victory which our sweet country gained by the release of the Croats, who were forced to take up arms [against us], as a great impact. [After we released them] They have sworn never to serve against Hungary. (Excerpt from the report of National Guard Major Vilmos Csapó) Except of these, during the fights at Tác on 4 October 11 Croatians were killed, alongside one Hungarian dead and 3 wounded. On the same day in the fights at Aba, 1 Hungarian was killed and 3 were wounded.

It is worth noting that Mór Perczel's war report mentioned all the officers who played a role in achieving the victory, but not a word about Görgei. This also shows that he did not forget or forgive him for their disputes during this operation. It was therefore fortunate that the government order which, knowing of the antagonism between the two, ordered Görgei to go to Pest after the success at Ozora, thus preventing further direct conflicts between the two proud and stubborn officers.

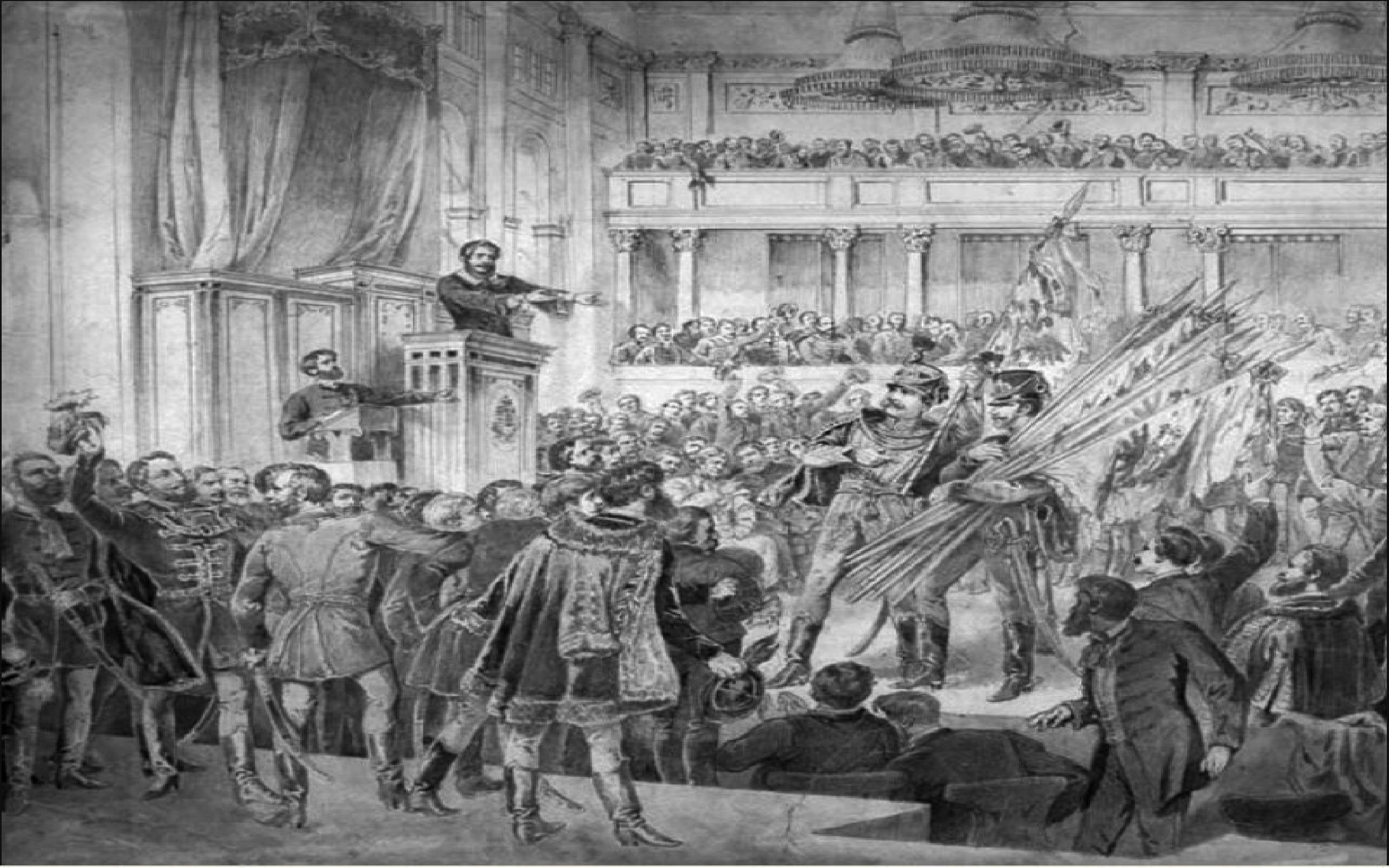
Presenting the captured Croatian flags in the Hungarian parliament

It is difficult to decide who deserves the main credit: Mór Perczel, who "directed the military operation", Artúr Görgei, who drew up the plan, or Vilmos Csapó, who brought the National Guards together. The fact is that it was a great success, or as the politician Károly Eötvös put it, the victory at Ozora was "the greatest and most perfect triumph in the whole course of our struggle for independence". This - almost - bloodless triumph was one of the greatest successes of the Hungarian Honvéd Army during the War of Independence, also because it provided the Hungarian army, always in urgent need of weapons, with a significant amount of arms.

The National Defence Committee allowed the National Guardsmen of Tolna County, who did so much for the success, to have a ribbon on their flag with the following inscription to commemorate their bravery: Ozora, 7 October - 1848. Three of the three-pounder guns taken from Roth were engraved with the inscription "In memory of the triumph of Ozora" by the National Defense Committee and were donated to the Tolna County National Guards. The county's artillery battery, established in this way, later served in the defense of Eszék.

After the Battle of Ozora, the National Defence Committee promoted Perczel to the rank of General, and Görgei and Csapó to the rank of Colonel.

The 'Battle of Ozora', which was fought without major confrontation, was the first major battle of the 1848-49 War of Independence in which national guardsmen and spontaneously organized insurgents triumphed over an enemy army.

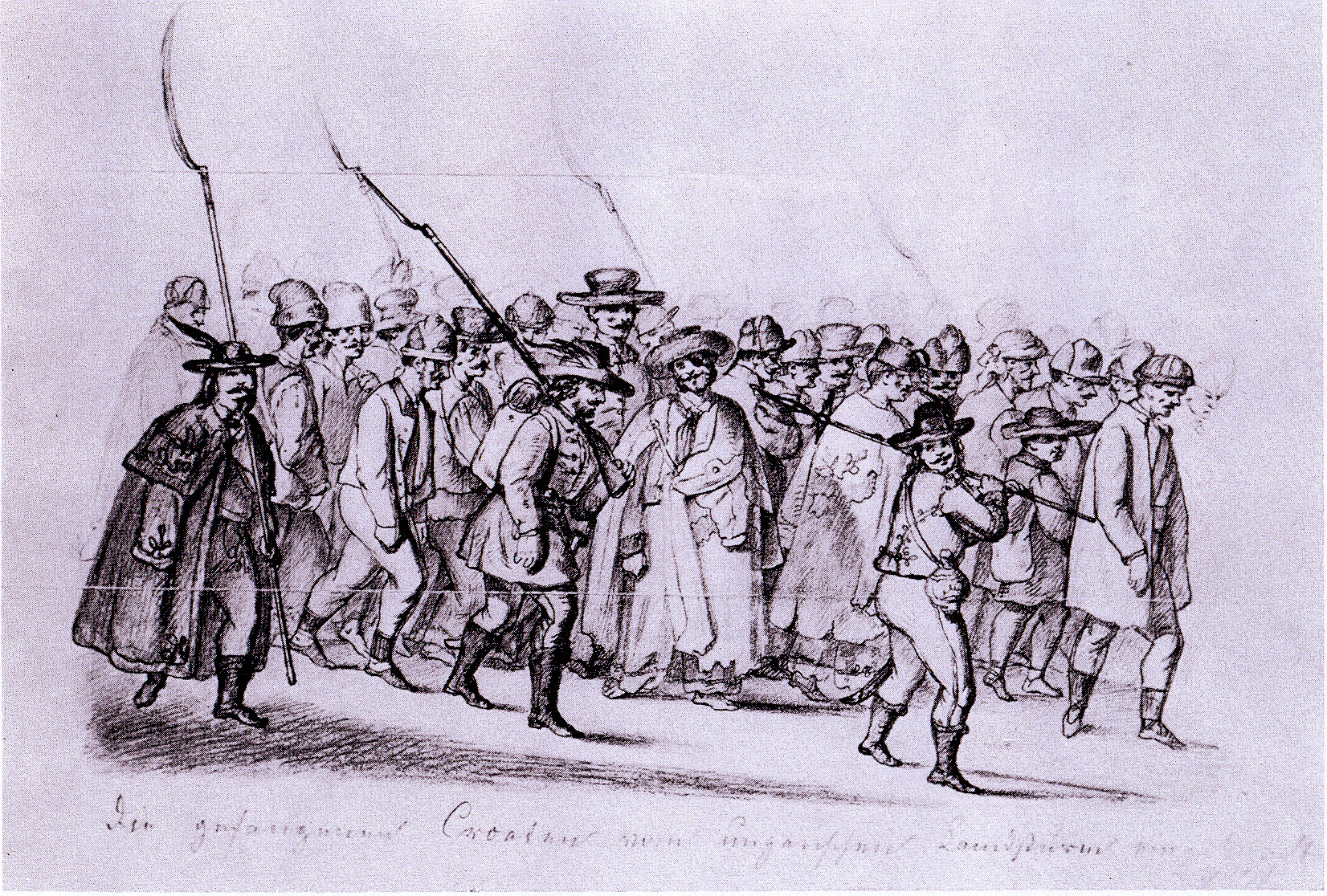
Escorting of the Croatian captives by Hungarian insurgents, after their surrender at Ozora - anonym drawing

For a long time after Roth's attack, it was questionable whether the garrison of the important fortress of Eszék, which, at the beginning, had declared itself neutral, would hand or not over the castle to József Bunyik, the commissioner of Jelačić. On 8 October, the National Defense Committee called on the fortress from the right bank of the Dráva river, to fly the Hungarian flag, as it had done with the other fortresses. The fort's commander, Major General Stevan Jović, was at a loss as to what to do. He received no direct orders from the Imperial War Ministry in Vienna, and his superior, the commander-in-chief in the fortress of Pétervárad, recognised the authority of the National Defence Committee. On 18 October, Jović also raised the Hungarian flag, and on 22 October, Count Kázmér Batthyány, the government commissioner of Baranya, entered Eszék with 1,217 volunteers and 5 cannons. The fortress was thus in Hungarian hands. During the winter of 1848-1849 the defenders of Eszék launched limited attacks against Croatian forces on the right bank of the Dráva. It defeated the Croatian cordon troops at Čepin on 13 November and at Sarvaš on 15 November, and with these victories gave the garrison a relatively large margin of maneuver until mid-December. By securing Eszék, the whole of the Dráva line was back in Hungarian hands, and thanks to the fortress, the Hungarians also had a bridgehead on the right bank of the river.

The liberation of South Transdanubia was completed with the victory at Ozora and the securing of Eszék. Ozora also proved that the National Guards and the popular uprising, led by professional officers and supplemented by regular troops and artillery, could effectively confront the enemy's second and third line troops. In this respect, however, the triumph of Ozora was an exceptional example in the history of the Hungarian War of Independence. One important explanation for its success was that, while the Hungarian side had cavalry, Roth had none, so he was forced to advance 'blind and deaf' because he had no one to provide him with information.

This was perhaps the most favourable moment for the Hungarian side during the War of Independence, because on 6 October a revolution broke out again in Vienna, and Austrian Minister of War Theodor Franz, Count Baillet von Latour was hanged, while Jelačić fled westwards and the imperial court to Olmütz. The Hungarian army advanced triumphantly towards the Austrian frontier, but the hesitation of the military leadership and the Habsburgs' concentration of forces, in which the army of Jelačić played an important role, soon turned the tide of the war in the Battle of Schwechat (30 October 1848).

== Sources ==
- Bánlaky, József (2001). A magyar nemzet hadtörténelme (The Military History of the Hungarian Nation) (in Hungarian). Budapest: Arcanum Adatbázis.
- Dobos, Gyula (2007), Ozora. Száz magyar falu könyvesháza ("Ozora. Bookhouse of Hundred Hungarian Villages") (in Hungarian)
- Hermann, Róbert (May 1995), A szabadságharc hadserege (""Army of the revolution") (in Hungarian), Rubicon
- Hermann, Róbert (2004). Az 1848–1849-es szabadságharc nagy csatái ("Great battles of the Hungarian War of Independence of 1848–1849") (in Hungarian). Budapest: Zrínyi. p. 408. ISBN 963-327-367-6.
- Horváth, Gábor (2015), "Október 7. – Az ozorai ütközet ("7 October - The Battle of Ozora")", győriszalon.hu 07.10.2015 (in Hungarian)
- Nobili, Johann. Hungary 1848: The Winter Campaign. Edited and translated Christopher Pringle. Warwick, UK: Helion & Company Ltd., 2021.
- Tarján, Tamás, "Az ozorai csata ("The Battle of Ozora")", Rubicon Online (in Hungarian)
