= Illocska =

Village in Baranya, Hungary

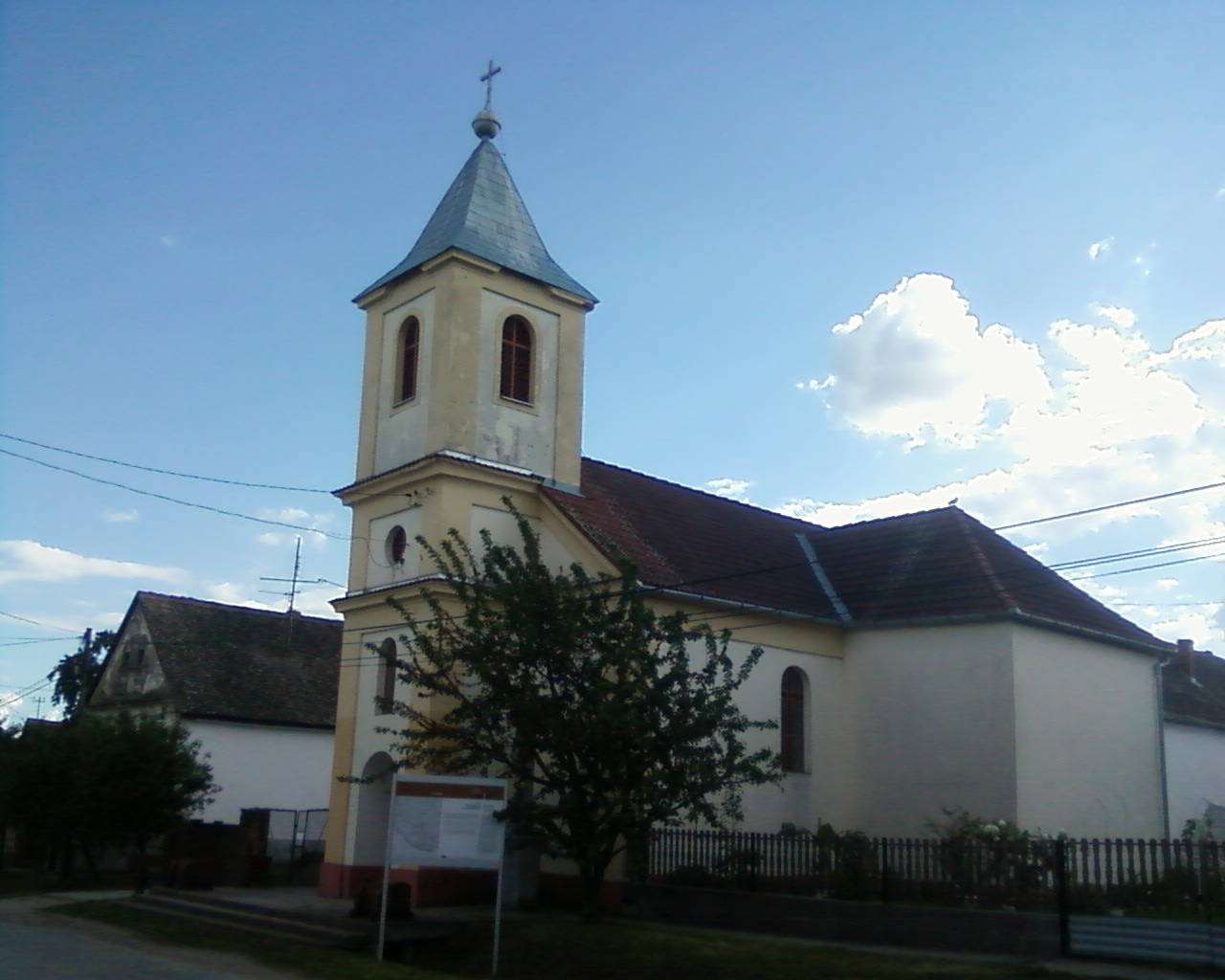
- Interactive map of Illocska
- Location of Illocska
- Coordinates: 45.80097°N 18.52327°E
- Country: Hungary
- County: Baranya

Area
  - Total: 15.1 km^{2} (5.8 sq mi)

Population (2004)
  - Total: 257
  - Density: 17.01/km^{2} (44.1/sq mi)
- Time zone: UTC+1 (CET)
  - Summer (DST): UTC+2 (CEST)
- Postal code: 7775
- Area code: 72

Illocska (German: Illutsch, Serbo-Croatian: Илочац, Iločac) is a village in Baranya county, Hungary. Residents are Magyars, with a minority of Serbs and Danube Swabians.

== History ==
Until the end of World War II, the majority of the inhabitants were Roman Catholic Danube Swabians (Schwowe), their ancestors arrived in 1790 from Nagyszékely and Gyönk villages to Illocska. Most of the former German settlers were expelled to allied-occupied Germany and allied-occupied Austria in 1946–1948, following the Potsdam Agreement. Only a few Germans of Hungary live there, the majority today are the descendants of Hungarians from the Czechoslovak–Hungarian population exchange. They got the houses of the former Danube Swabian Inhabitants.
