= Gyönk =

Gyönk Jink
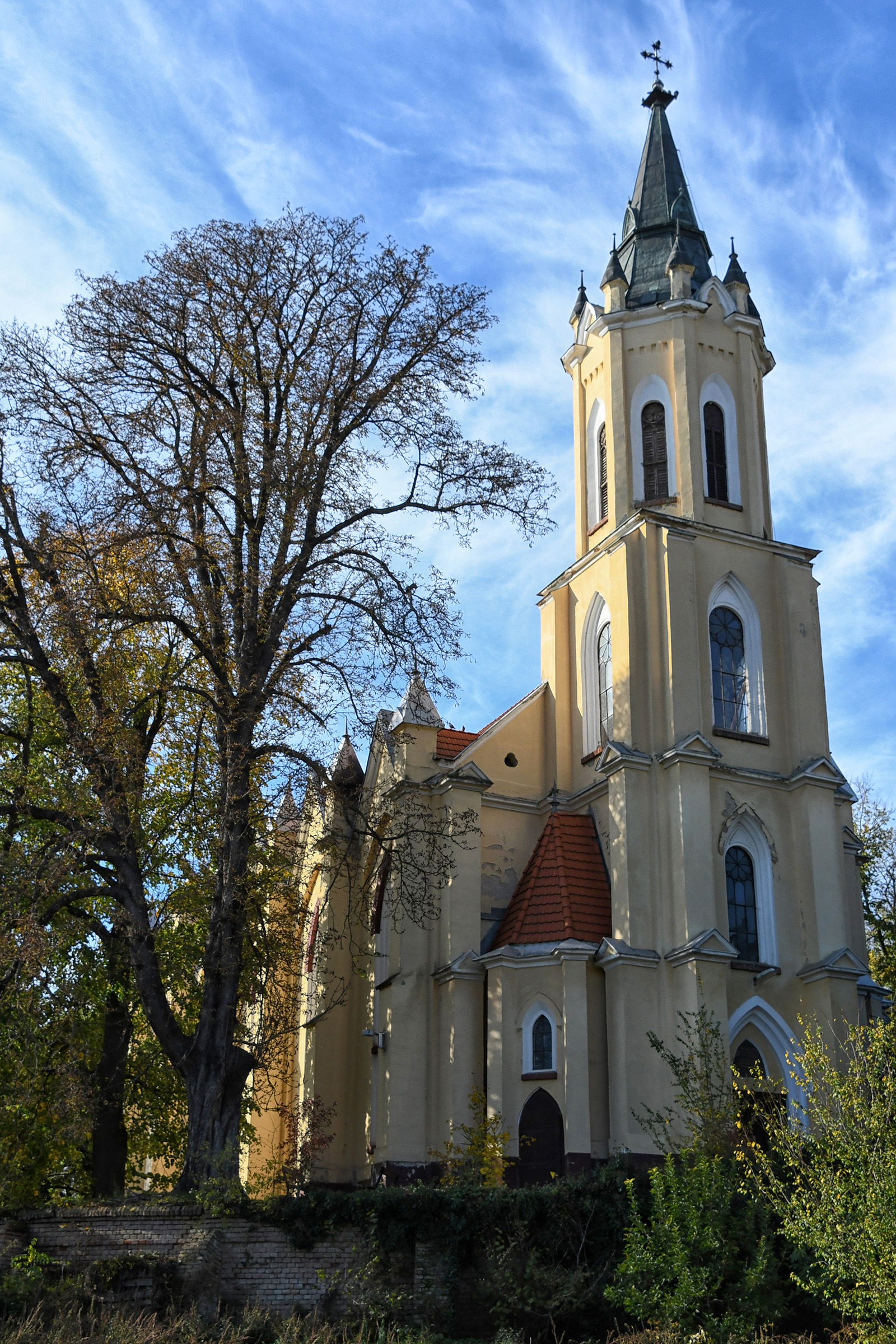
- Lutheran Church in Gyönk

- Flag Coat of arms

- Location in Hungary
- Coordinates: 46°33′N 18°31′E
- Country: Hungary
- County: Tolna

Government
  - Mayor: Gyula Katz

Area
  - Total: 38.12 km^{2} (14.72 sq mi)

Population (2009)
  - Total: 2,051
  - Density: 53.80/km^{2} (139.4/sq mi)
- Time zone: UTC+1 (CET)
  - Summer (DST): UTC+2 (CEST)
- Postal code: 7064
- Area code: 74
- Website: gyonk.hu

Gyönk (German: Jink) is a village in Tolna County, Hungary.

== History ==
Gyönk was mentioned for the first time in 1280, but the neighborhood (and Gyönk) was already a populated area by then. The village was inhabited by Turks for some time, and by the time of the Rákóczi it was depopulated. In the early 18th century, Hungarian and German families arrived in the village. The school was founded in 1806. In 1882, the Budapest-Pécs-Dombóvár-rail line, which passes through the Kapos Valley, connected to the village.

In 1891, there were 3,371 German and Hungarian inhabitants. In 1947, as part of the Czechoslovak-Hungarian population exchange, nine Highland Hungarian families (55 people) were resettled in the upland village of Martos.

Until the end of World War II, the inhabitants were majority of Danube Swabian (Schwowe) descent, whose ancestors had come from Swabia and Franconia. Around 1790, Catholic German families from Gyönk settled in Illocska. Most of the former German settlers were expelled to Allied-occupied Germany and Allied-occupied Austria in 1945–1948, following the Potsdam Agreement. Only a few Germans of Hungary still live in Gyönk: the majority today are the descendants of Hungarians from the Czechoslovak–Hungarian population exchange.

== Notable landmarks ==
The Reformed Church was built between 1775 and 1777, and consecrated on May 25, 1777. The tower was completed in 1836. The second organ of the church, dated to 1910 is a masterpiece. The neo-Gothic style Lutheran Church designed by Gyula Reppmannin was completed in 1896. The Catholic Church was built in 1926. Magyary Kossa-Castle was built in 1830.

== Demographics ==
As of 2022, the town is 91.7% Hungarian, 8.7% German, 2.8% Gypsy, and 1.1% of non-European origin. 27.7% of the townsfolk are Roman Catholic, 13.8% Lutheran, 13.1% Reformed, and 10.8% nondenominational.

== Twin towns – sister cities ==
Gyönk is twinned with:

- Darmstadt, Germany, since 1990
- Griesheim, Germany, since 1990
- Bar-le-Duc, France, since 1996
- Wilkau-Haßlau, Germany, since 1997
