= Madocsa =

- Coat of arms

- Location of Madocsa in Hungary
- Coordinates: 46.688°N 18.949°E
- Country: Hungary
- Region: Southern Transdanubia
- County: Tolna

Area
  - Total: 43.33 km^{2} (16.73 sq mi)

Population (2012)
  - Total: 1,881
  - Density: 43.41/km^{2} (112.4/sq mi)
- Time zone: UTC+1 (CET)
  - Summer (DST): UTC+2 (CEST)
- Postal code: 7026
- Area code: +36 75
- Website: https://www.madocsa.hu/

Madocsa is a village in Tolna County, Hungary.

== Location ==
Madocsa situated 1.5 km to the west direction from Danube river, 5–6 km to the east direction form the border of Tolna hilly country, on a higher point of the flood area. Can be reached from Dunaföldvár (14 km) to the south direction on an almost parallel road with Danube via Bölcske, or from Paks (11 km) to the north-east direction leaving the main road No. 6 at Dunakömlőd.

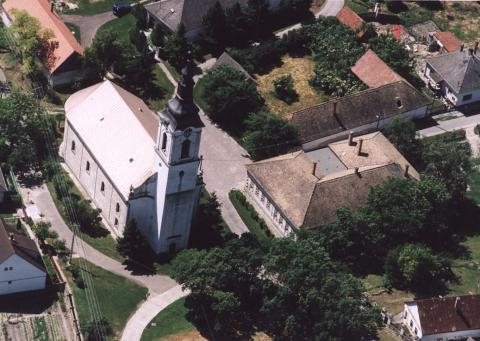
Madocsa, church from a bird's eye view
