= Ferenc Hirt =

Hungarian politician (1967–2018)

Member of the National Assembly
- In office 16 May 2006 – 7 December 2018

Personal details
- Born: 29 September 1967 Pincehely, Hungary
- Died: 7 December 2018 (aged 51)
- Party: Fidesz (since 2005)
- Children: 1
- Profession: Businessman, politician

Ferenc Hirt (29 September 1967 – 7 December 2018) was a Hungarian entrepreneur and politician, member of the National Assembly (MP) for Tamási (Tolna County Constituency V) from 2006 to 2014, and for Paks (Tolna County 3rd constituency) from 2014 to 2018. He was elected MP via the Fidesz national list in 2018. He was the first physically disabled MP in the Hungarian Parliament.

== Biography ==
Hirt studied in Tamási and Szekszárd. He obtained a vocational diploma in 1985. After that he worked for the Tamási Építőipari Ktsz. as an electrician. He moved to the manufacturing unit of Orion Electronics in Tamási. In 1988, he suffered a car accident, after which he used a wheelchair.

He joined Fidesz in 2005. He was elected to the National Assembly during the parliamentary election in 2006. He was a member of the Committee on Youth, Social, Family, and Housing affairs between 30 May 2006 and 5 May 2014. He also chaired Subcommittee on Equality and Disability between 2007 and 2010. He became a member of the Tamási municipal council in 2010.

== Personal life ==
He had a daughter.
