= Ozora =

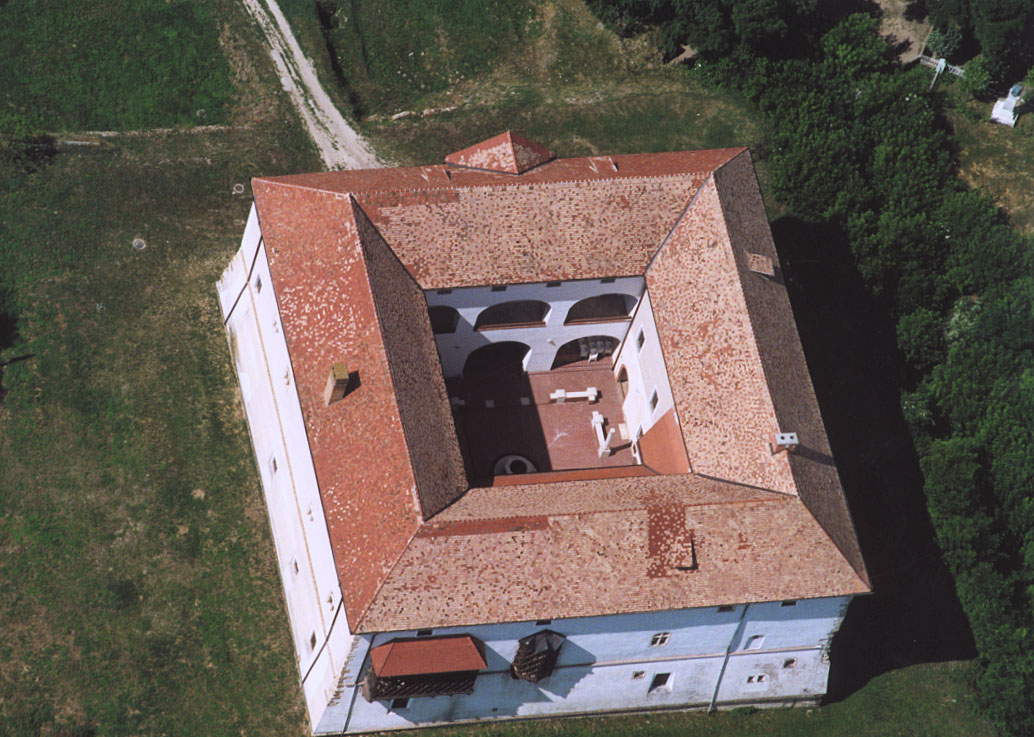
- Aerial photograph of Ozora Castle

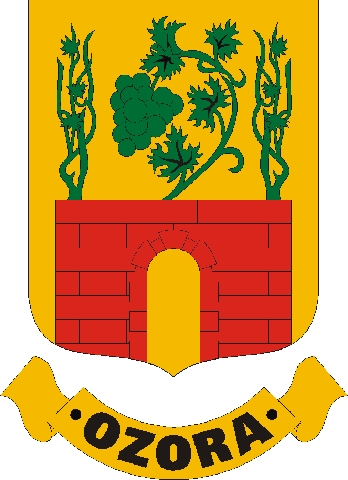
- Coat of arms

- Location of Ozora in Hungary
- Coordinates: 46.7529°N 18.3985°E
- Country: Hungary
- Region: Southern Transdanubia
- County: Tolna
- Subregion: Tamás

Area
  - Total: 59.58 km^{2} (23.00 sq mi)

Population (2009)
  - Total: 1,666
  - Density: 27.96/km^{2} (72.42/sq mi)
- Time zone: UTC+1 (CET)
  - Summer (DST): UTC+2 (CEST)
- Postal code: 7086
- Area code: +36 74
- KSH code: 05661
- Website: www.ozora.hu

Ozora is a village in Tolna, Hungary. It has been notable since the Middle Ages, when Pipo of Ozora built a castle at this site by permission of Sigismund of Hungary in 1416. Artúr Görgei won an important victory in this area at the Battle of Ozora during the Hungarian Revolution of 1848. In recent times, it has become famous for the psychedelic Ozora Festival, which has been held annually since 2004 on an estate in Ozora near the small village Dádpuszta.

== Notable residents ==
- Filippo Buondelmonti degli Scolari, also known as Pippo Spano (1369 – 1426), Italian magnate, general, strategist and confidant of King Sigismund of Hungary

== Gallery ==
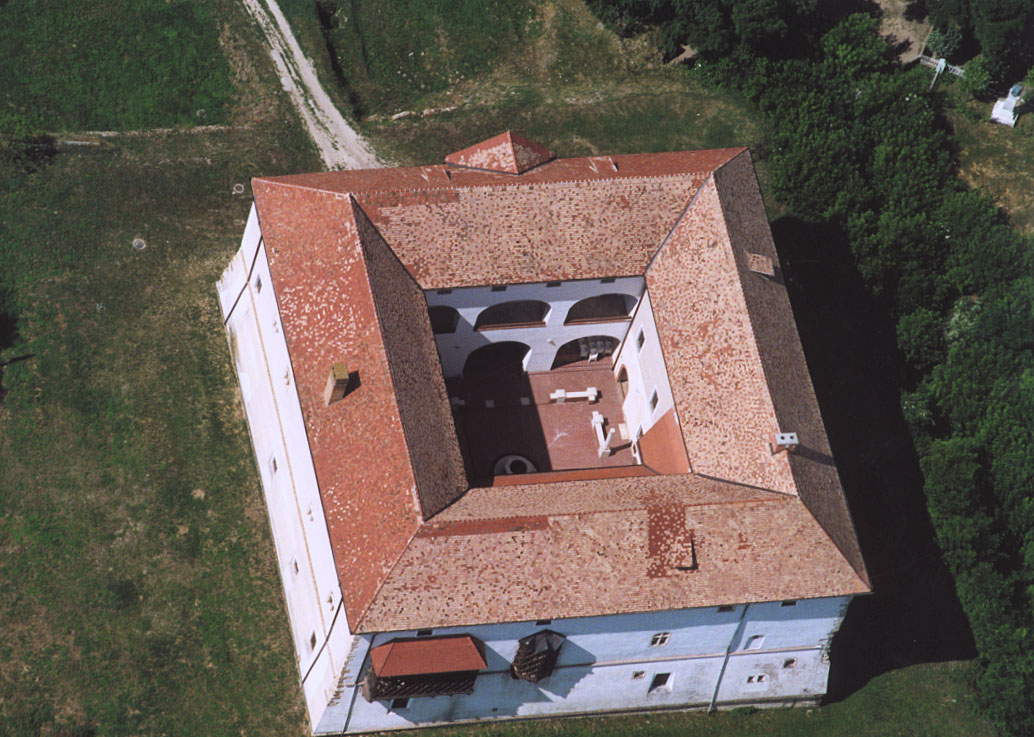
The castle of Pippo of Ozora

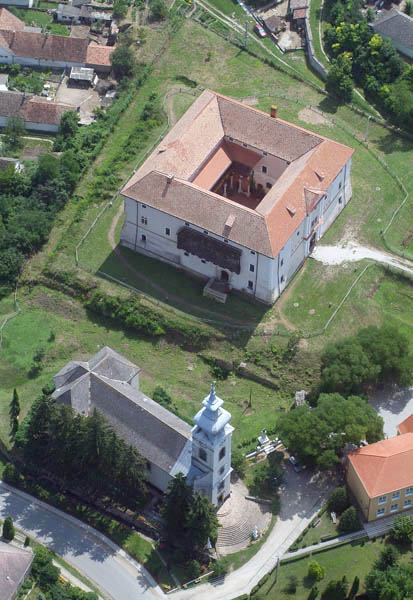

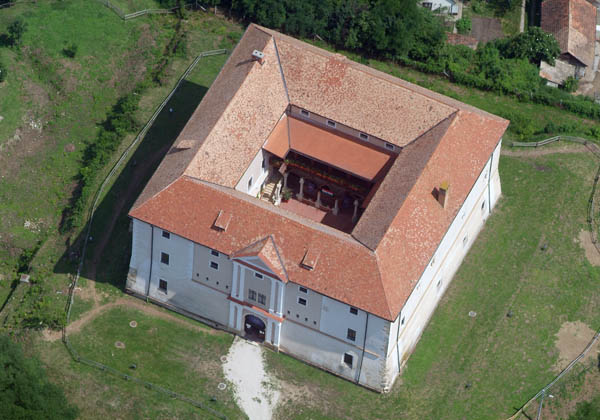
