= Nagyszékely =

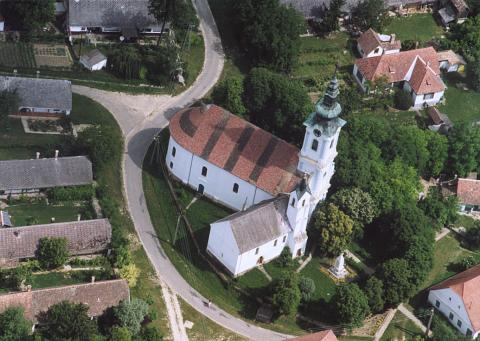
- Reformed church

- Coat of arms

- Location within Hungary
- Coordinates: 46°38′46″N 18°31′42″E
- Country: Hungary
- County: Tolna

Area
  - Total: 36.7 km^{2} (14.2 sq mi)

Population (2011)
  - Total: 441
  - Density: 12.0/km^{2} (31.1/sq mi)
- Time zone: UTC+1 (CET)
  - Summer (DST): UTC+2 (CEST)
- Postal code: 7085
- Area code: 74
- Website: www.nagyszekely.hu

Nagyszékely (German: Großsäckl) is a village in Tolna county, Hungary.

== History ==
Until the end of World War II, the inhabitants' majority was Protestant Danube Swabian (Schwowe) whose ancestors once arrived in 1720-1722 and onwards from the Hanau surroundings like Hüttengesäss (the Neidhardt family), Langen (the Lehr family), Schlüchtern (the Hildebrand family), Udenhain (the Los and Reinhardt families), Villingen (the Hilgert family) and possibly the Isenburg-Meerholz county (the Hinckel family).

Most of the former German settlers were expelled to Allied-occupied Germany and Allied-occupied Austria in 1945–1948, following the Potsdam Agreement.

Around 1790, Catholic German families from Nagyszékely settled in Illocska.
