= Bölcske =

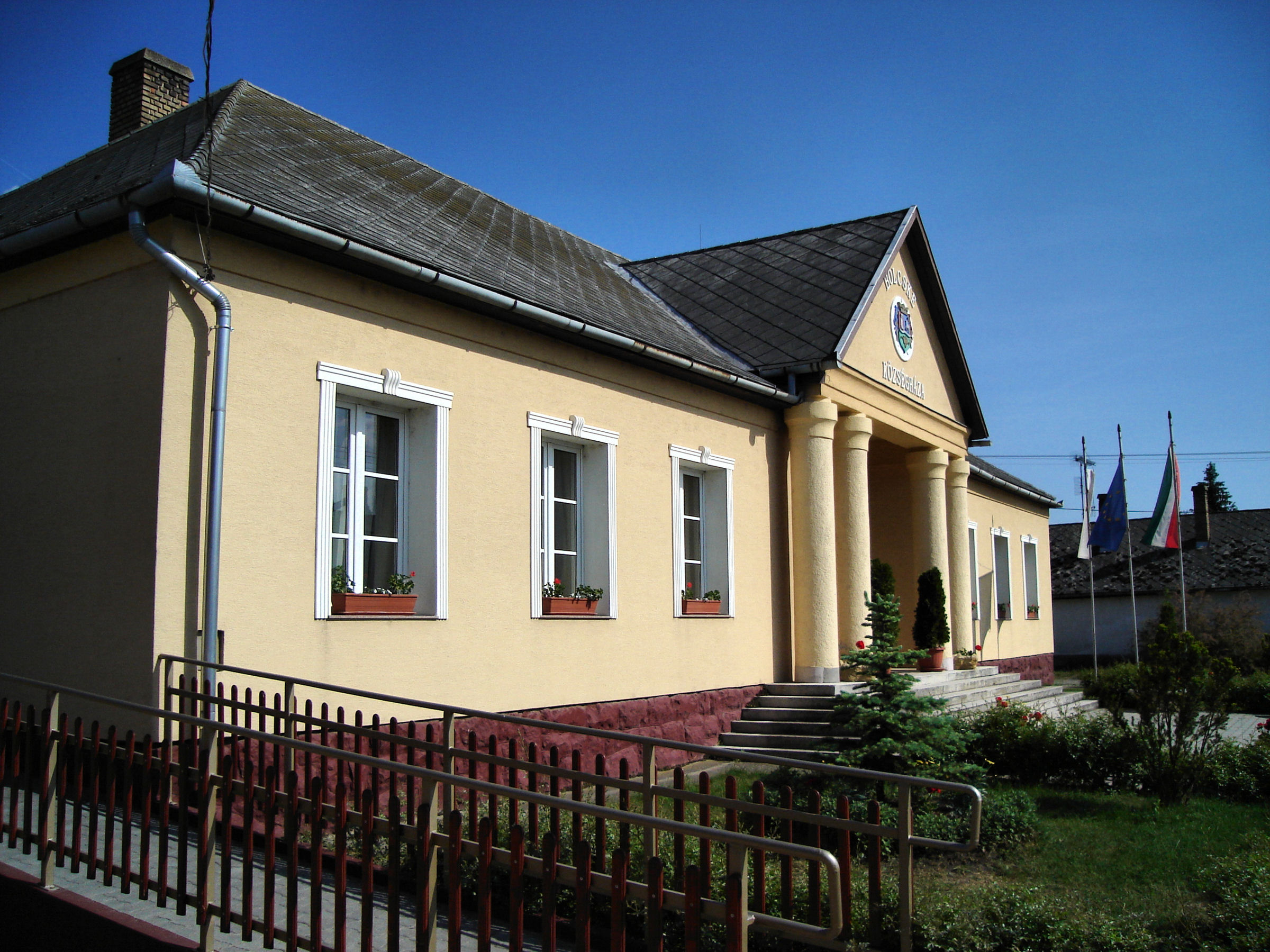
- Village hall

- Coat of arms

- Location of Bölcske in Hungary
- Coordinates: 46.741°N 18.960°E
- Country: Hungary
- Region: Southern Transdanubia
- County: Tolna
- Subregion: Paksi
- Rank: Village

Area
  - Total: 58.78 km^{2} (22.70 sq mi)

Population (1 January 2008)
  - Total: 2,904
  - Density: 49.40/km^{2} (128.0/sq mi)
- Time zone: UTC+1 (CET)
  - Summer (DST): UTC+2 (CEST)
- Postal code: 7025
- Area code: +36 75
- KSH code: 06558
- Website: www.bolcske.hu

Bölcske is a village in Tolna County, Hungary.
