= Pincehely =

- Location of Tolna county in Hungary

- Location of Pincehely
- Country: Hungary
- County: Tolna

Area
  - Total: 50.14 km^{2} (19.36 sq mi)

Population (2004)
  - Total: 2,569
  - Density: 51.23/km^{2} (132.7/sq mi)
- Time zone: UTC+1 (CET)
  - Summer (DST): UTC+2 (CEST)
- Postal code: 7084
- Area code: 74

Pincehely (German: Binsenhelm) is a large village in Tolna County, Hungary.

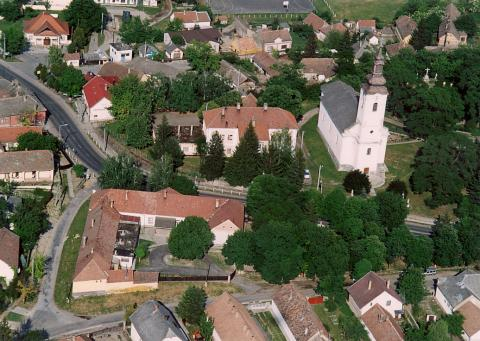
Aerial photography of Pincehely

== Famous residents ==
- Ferenc Hirt, (1967-), Hungarian politician, entrepreneur
- Ivett Szepesi (1986-), Hungarian handballer
